= José María Manuel Cortina Pérez =

Spanish architect (1868–1950)

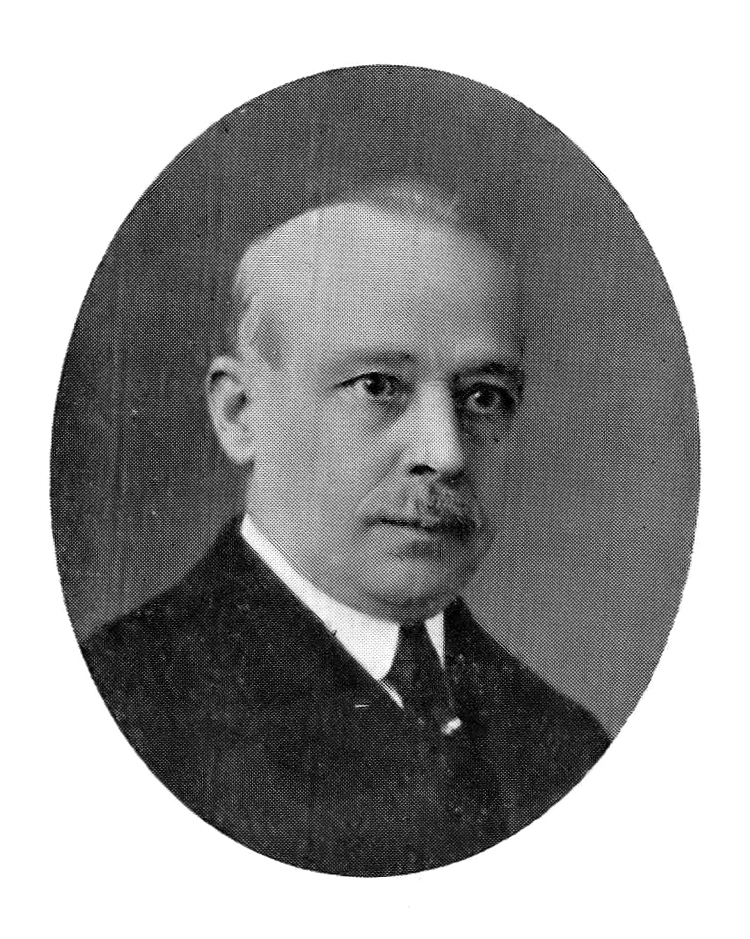
- Born: 1868; Valencia
- Died: 1950 (aged 81–82)
- Known for: Architecture

José María Manuel Cortina Pérez (1868–1950) was a Spanish architect known for his imaginative and fantastic designs. He is considered one of the main architects of the Valencian Art Nouveau.

== Life ==
Cortina Pérez was born in Valencia in 1868. He studied architecture in Madrid and Barcelona. He returned to his home town as a municipal architect but he picked up important commissions from religious bodies and private individuals. He created tombs, summer house and shrines.

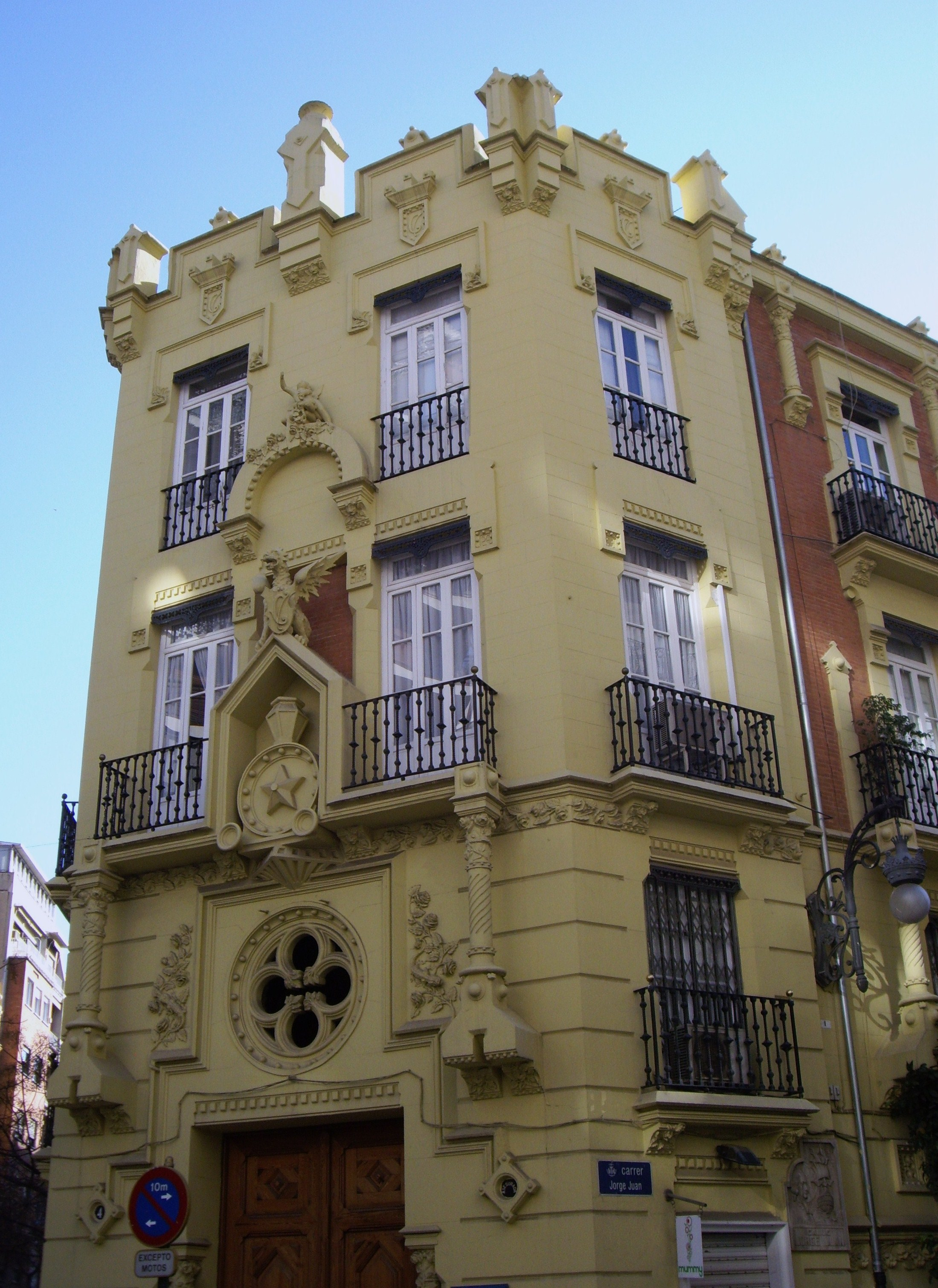
Casa dels Dracs in València

In 1901, the Building of the Dragons was built in Valancia which combined Moorish and Gothic influences with medieval ideas. The house also incorporates crenellations and dragons which give the house its name. which is still preserved on the corner of the Calle Jorge Juan Sorni shopping center. In 1903 his design for a building in Ceuta was completed and it was intended to take the names of its owners but it gained the similar name of House of the Dragons. That house lost its dragons but they were redesigned and replaced in 2006.

He won numerous awards during his career including joining the Royal Academy of Fine Arts of San Carlos de Valencia and gaining the Order of Isabella the Catholic. He died in 1950.

== Legacy ==
The legacy of Cortina Pérez's designs are well respected and a retrospective exhibition was held in March 2013 at Palacio del Marques de Dos Aguas de Valencia.
