= Mercado Central, Valencia =

Public market located in Valencia, Spain

Coordinates: 39°28′24.809″N 0°22′44.116″W

Mercado Central
- Mercado Central de Valencia (Spanish)
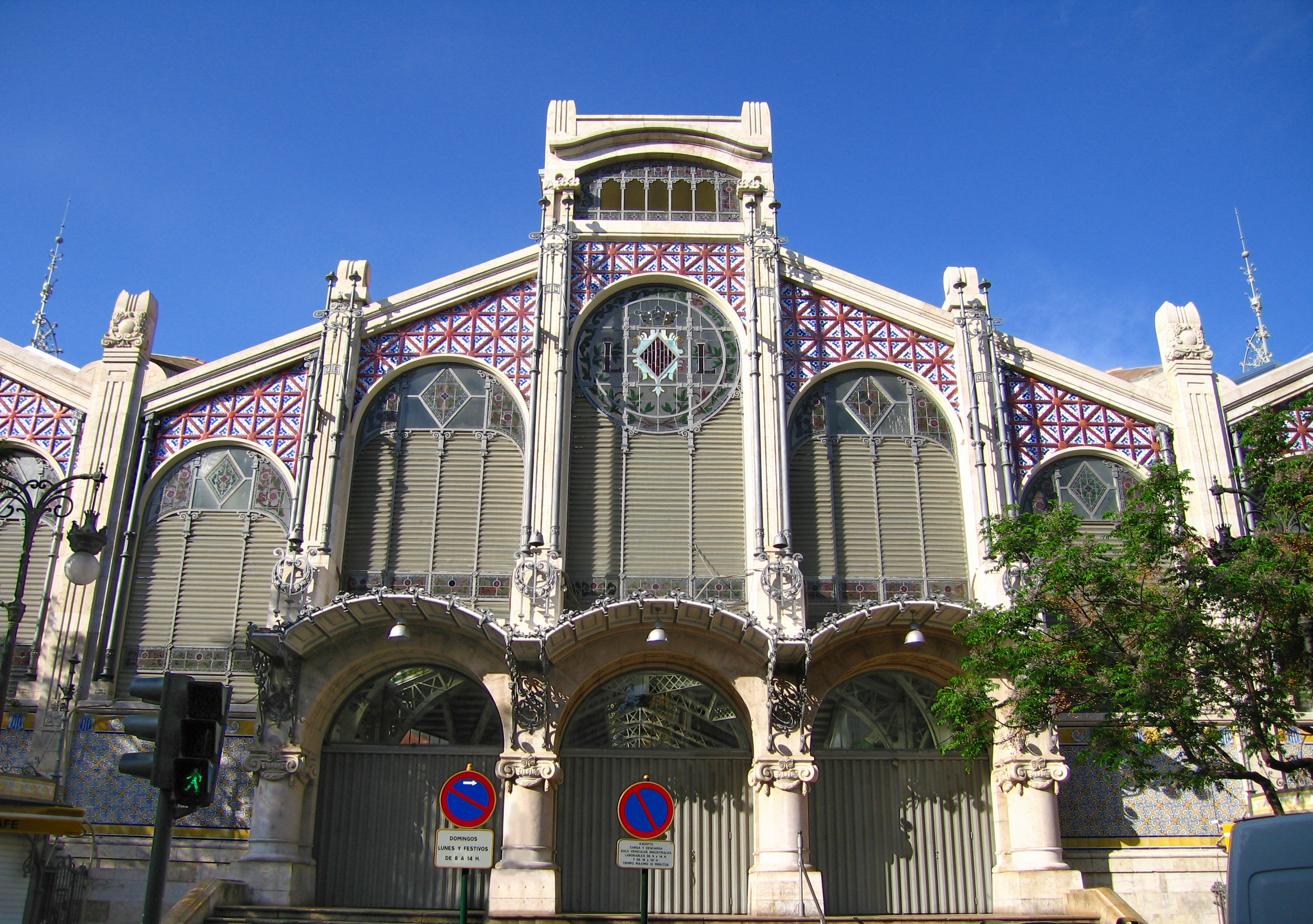
- Interactive map of Mercado Central
- Location: Valencia (Valencian Community)

History
- Built: 1914–1928

Site notes
- Architectural style: Valencian Art Nouveau

Spanish Cultural Heritage
- Type: Non-movable
- Criteria: Monument
- Reference no.: RI-51-0008309

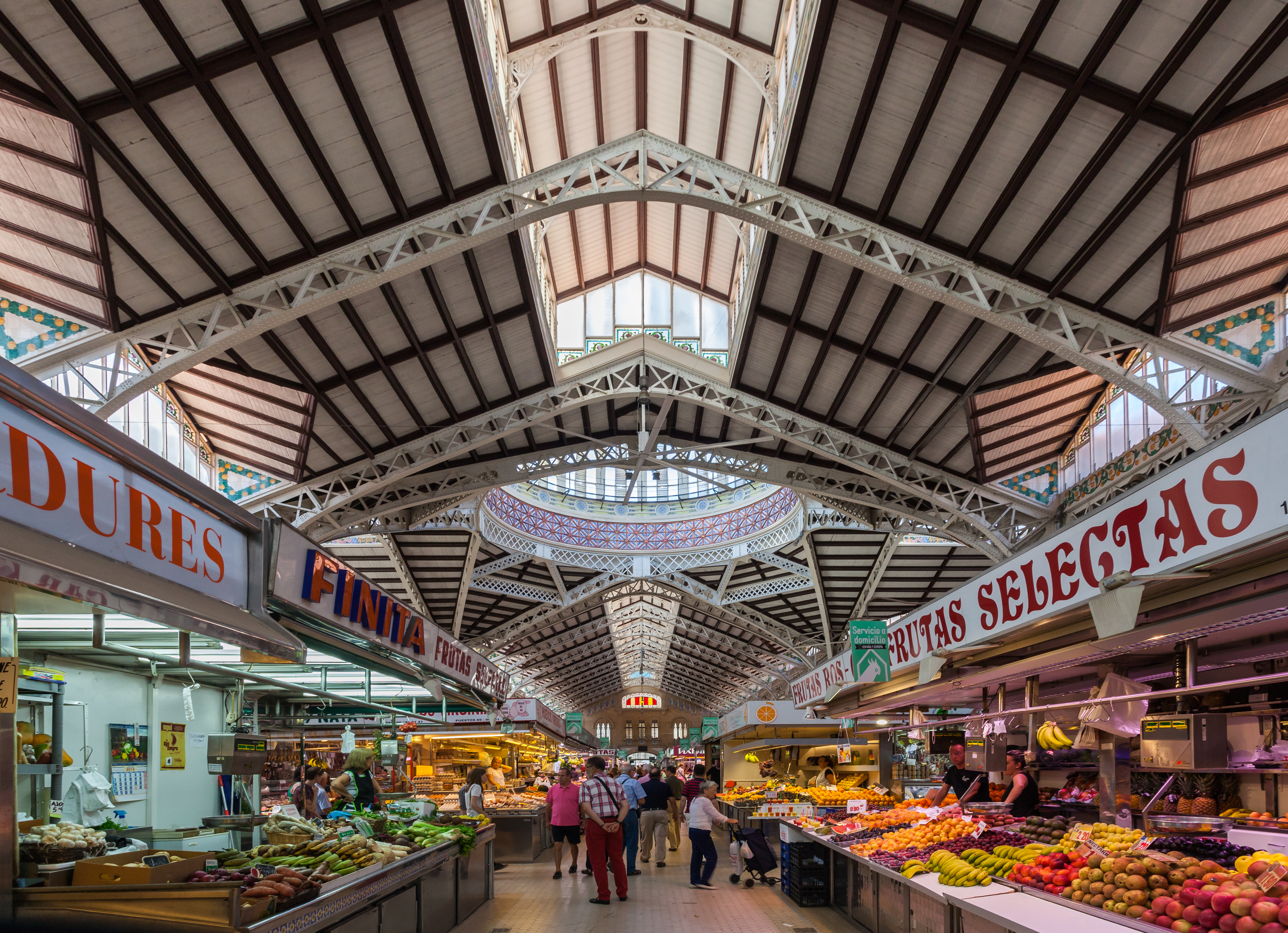
View of the interior.

Mercado Central or Mercat Central (English: Central Market) is a public market located across from the Llotja de la Seda and the Church of Santos Juanes in central Valencia, Spain. It is one of the main works of the Valencian Art Nouveau.

== History ==
In 1839, the spot had been used to inaugurate an open-air marketplace called Mercat Nou. By the end of the century the city of Valencia sponsored a contest for the construction of a new roofed market. A new contest in 1910 selected the present design by Alexandre Soler March and Francesc Guàrdia Vidal, who had got his architect's degree at the School of Architecture of Barcelona and collaborated with Lluís Domènech i Montaner. Construction began in 1914 and was not fully completed until 1928 by the Valencian architect Enrique Viedma Vidal.

The Central Market of Valencia is one of the largest in Europe; it covers more than 8,000 square metres (86,000 sq ft), with a predominantly Valencian Art Nouveau style. Its unusual roof comprises original domes and sloping sections at different heights, while the interior seems to be lined in a range of materials such as iron, wood, ceramics and polychromed tiles. The beauty of the building stands out especially on account of the light that enters through the roof at various points, and through coloured window panels.

The style blends a modern Valencian Art Nouveau look but mirrors some of the architectural influences of nearby buildings such as the Valencian Gothic style Lonja de la Seda and the eclectic Gothic-baroque church of Sants Juanes. It celebrates the power of iron and glass to permit the construction of large open spaces, but still utilizes domes at crossings.

Most vendors sell food items, although souvenir shops and restaurants are located inside the market as well. It is a popular location for tourists and locals alike.
