= Alcoy Cemetery =

Cemetery in Alcoy, Spain

Coordinates: 38°40′52″N 0°28′29″W

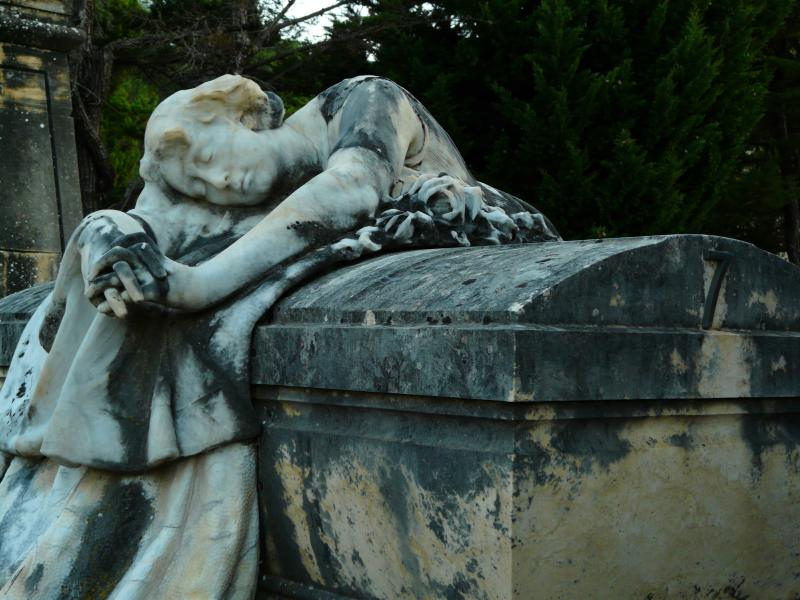
- Sculpture "Amor más allá de la muerte", in the Alcoy cemetery
- Interactive map of Alcoy Cemetery

Details
- Established: 1885
- Location: Ctra. Font Roja, 25 Alcoy (Alicante)
- Country: Spain
- Type: Public
- Find a Grave: Alcoy Cemetery

The Cementerio de San Antonio Abad (transl. Saint Anthony Cemetery) or Cementeri d'Alcoi is a cemetery located in Alcoy (Alicante), Spain.

This 19th-century cemetery is considered to be one of the most interesting in the Valencian Community, due to its unusual architecture and examples of Valencian Art Nouveau period funerary sculpture. It is listed on the European Cemeteries Route, a cultural itinerary established by the Council of Europe.

== Works and pantheons ==
The most important works of the Alcoy Cemetery are the following:

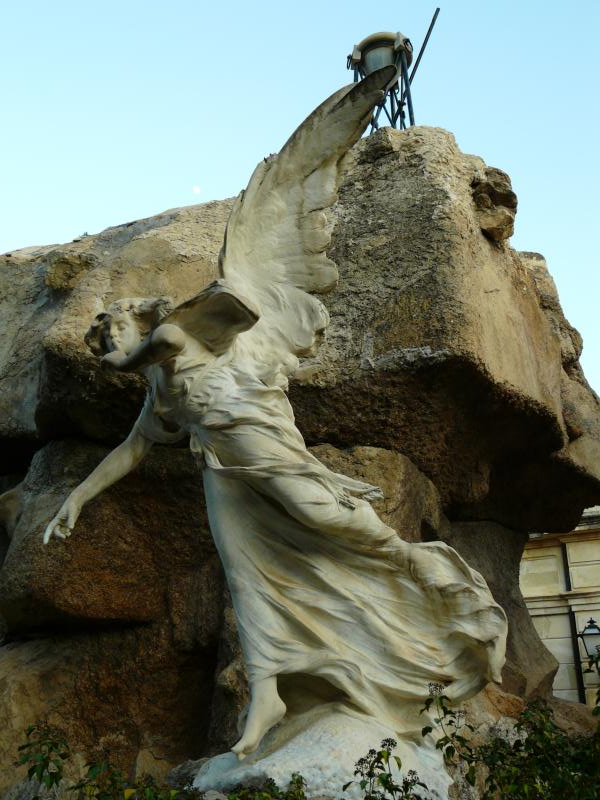
Sculpture "Ángel de la Luna" by Lorenzo Ridaura Gosálbez.

- Pantheon Gosálbez-Barceló: Academicism style. (1838).
- Pantheon Viuda de Brutinel: obra de Vicente Pascual Pastor. Eclectic style. (1894).
- Pantheon Jaime Tort: Obra de Jorge Vilaplana Carbonell. Eclectic style. (1895).
- Pantheon José Monllor: obra de Agustín Muñoz. Neo-egyptian style. (1896).
- Pantheon Moltó-Valor: work and sculpture of Lorenzo Ridaura Gosálbez. Classicism style. (1898).
- Pantheon José Semper: work of Jorge Vilaplana Carbonell. Neogothic style. (1901).
- Pantheon of Agustín Gisbert: work of Vicente Pascual Pastor, José Cort Merita as engineer, Fernando Cabrera Cantó as painter and Lorenzo Ridaura Gosálbez as sculptor. (1903). Art Nouveau style.
- Pantheon Anselmo Aracil: work of Vicente Pascual Pastor, sculpture of A. Clarí and stained glass windows of Eudaldo Ramón Amigó. Historic eclectic style. (1903).
- Pantheon Vicens: work of Ramón Lucini and stained glass windows of H.&J. Maumejean Hnos. Historic eclectic style. (1910).
- Pantheon Vilaplana Gisbert: work of Timoteo Briet Montaud, (1910). Art Nouveau style.
- Pantheon of Pérez Lloret family: work of Jaime Pérez Lloret, (1910). Art Nouveau style.
- Pantheon of Salvador García Botí (Escaló): work of Vicente Pascual Pastor and Eugenio Carbonell as sculptor. (1911). Art Nouveau style.
- Pantheon Enrique Carbonell: work of Vicente Pascual Pastor, diseño, relieves y escultura de Lorenzo Ridaura Gosálbez y relieves de la cripta de Tomás Ferrándiz. Art Nouveau style. (1925).
- Pantheon Enrique Hernández: work and sculpture of Lorenzo Ridaura Gosálbez, (1931). Art Nouveau style.
- Pantheon Desiderio Mataix: work of Joaquín Aracil and stained glass windows of "Unión de Artistas Vidrieros" of Irún. (1955, but built in 1970). Racionalist style.
- Pantheon Erum-Pascual: work of Cheluca Sala Palau and Mauro Matarredona. Made with Corten iron. (2009).

== See also ==
- Art Nouveau in Alcoy

== Bibliography ==
- Jaén i Urban, Gaspar (1999). Instituto de Cultura Juan Gil-Albert, Colegio Territorial de Arquitectos de Alicante, ed. Guía de arquitectura de la provincia de Alicante. p. 11. ISBN 84-7784-353-8.
- Doménech Romá, Jorge (2016). Urbanismo y vivienda obrera en Alcoy. Siglos XIX y XX. Publicaciones de la Universidad de Alicante. p. 328. ISBN 978-84-9717-494-7.
