= Valencian Art Nouveau =

Art and literature movement associated with Art Nouveau

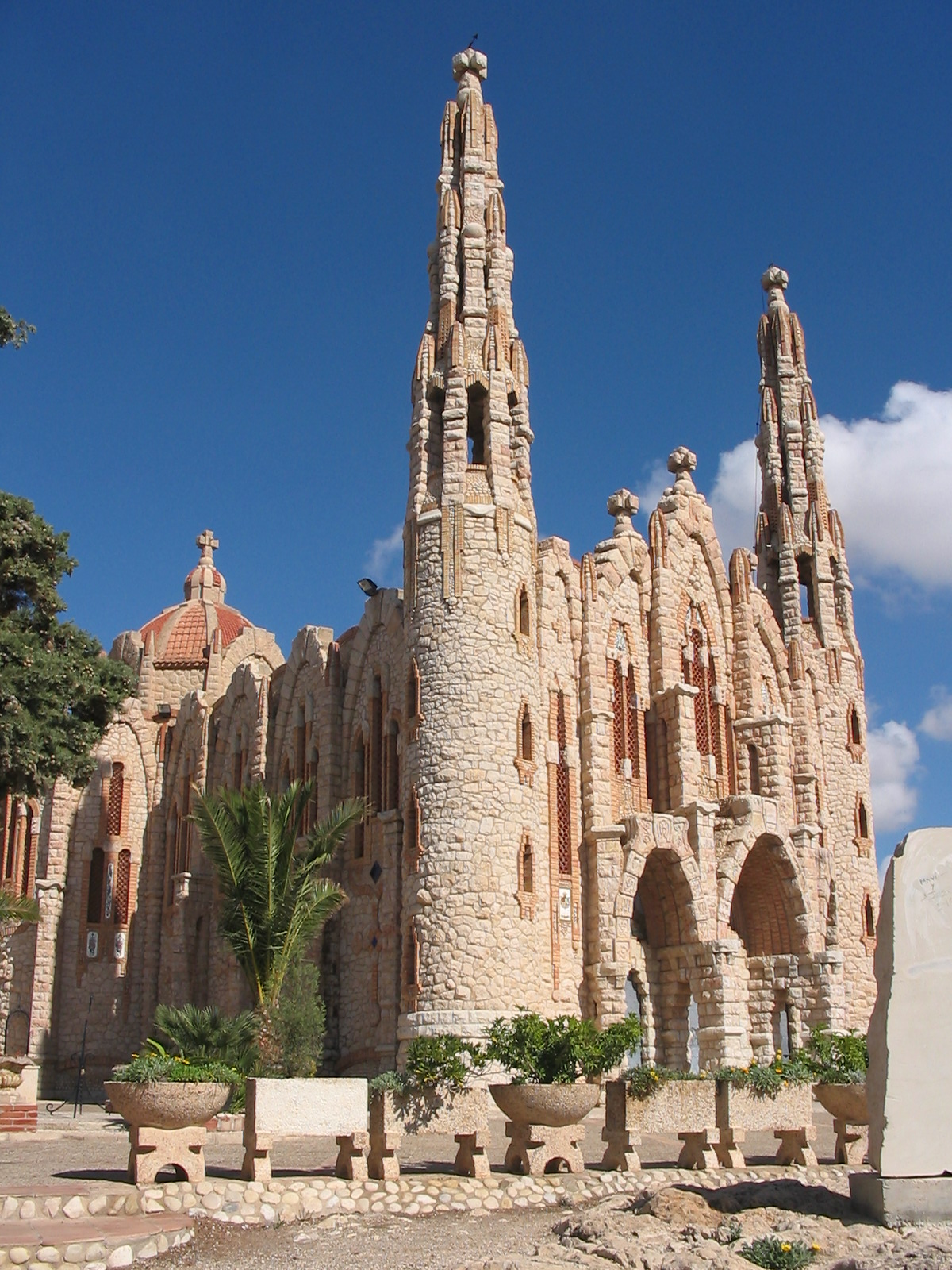
Sanctuary of Holy Maria Magdalena, in Novelda (Alicante).

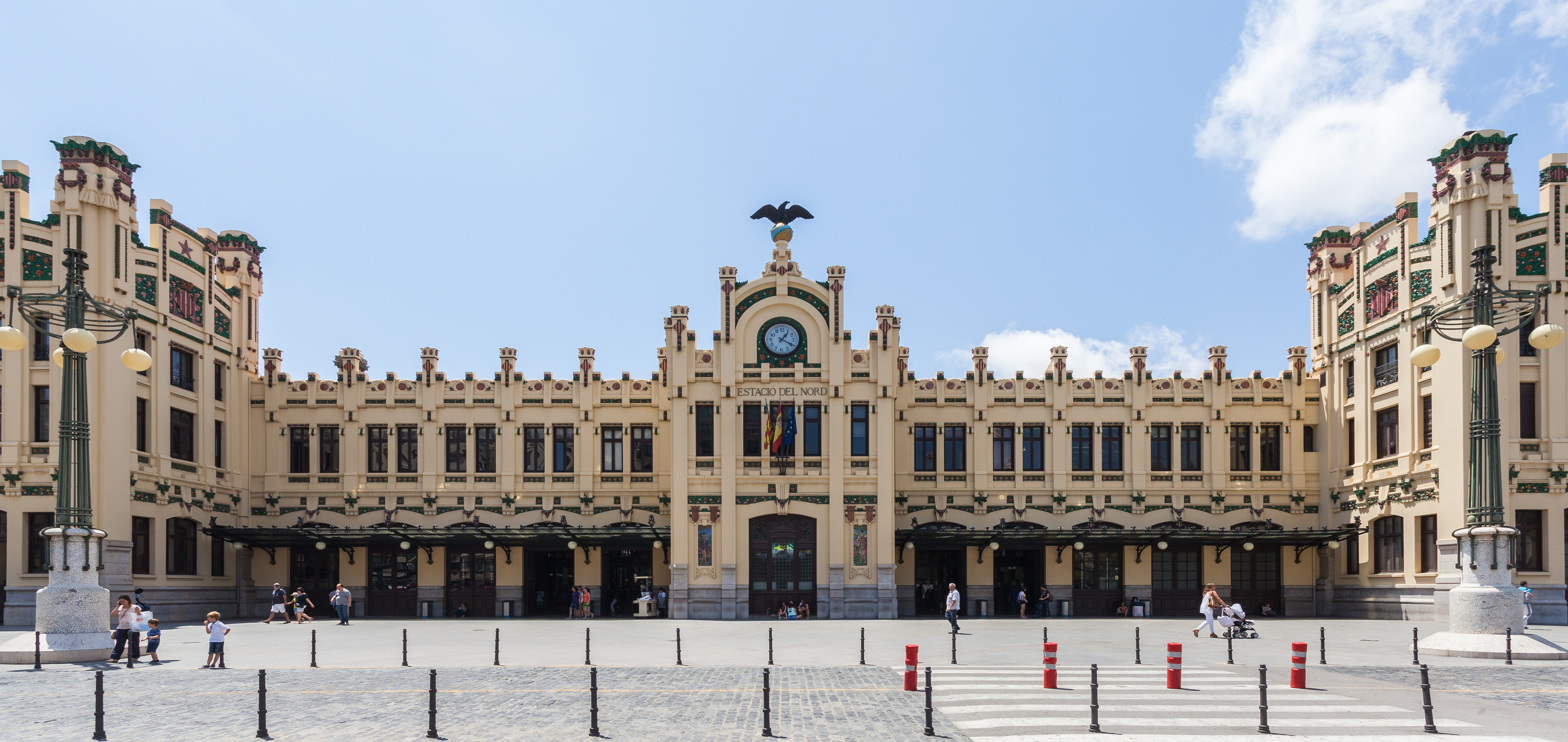
North Station, in Valencia.

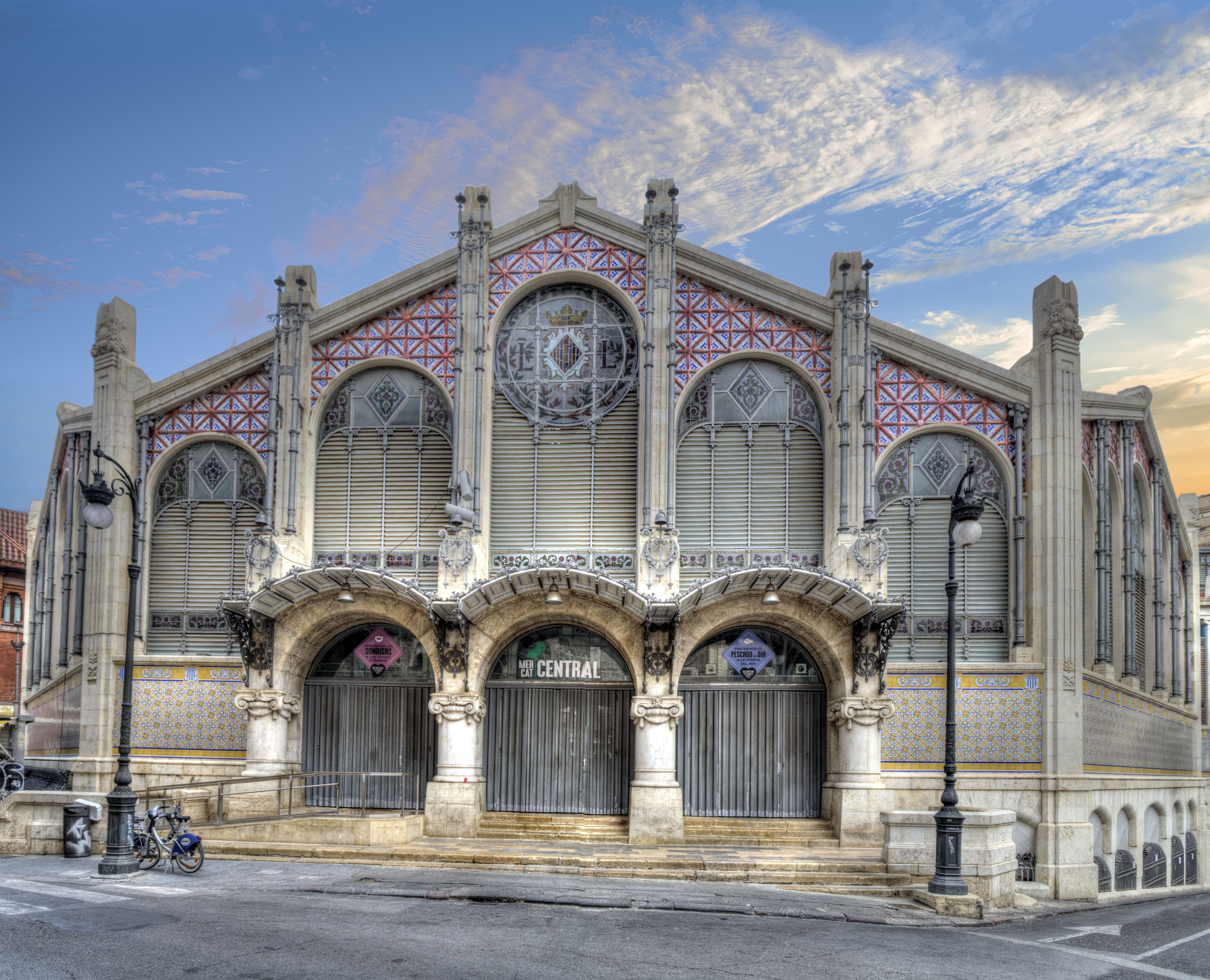
Central Market, in Valencia.

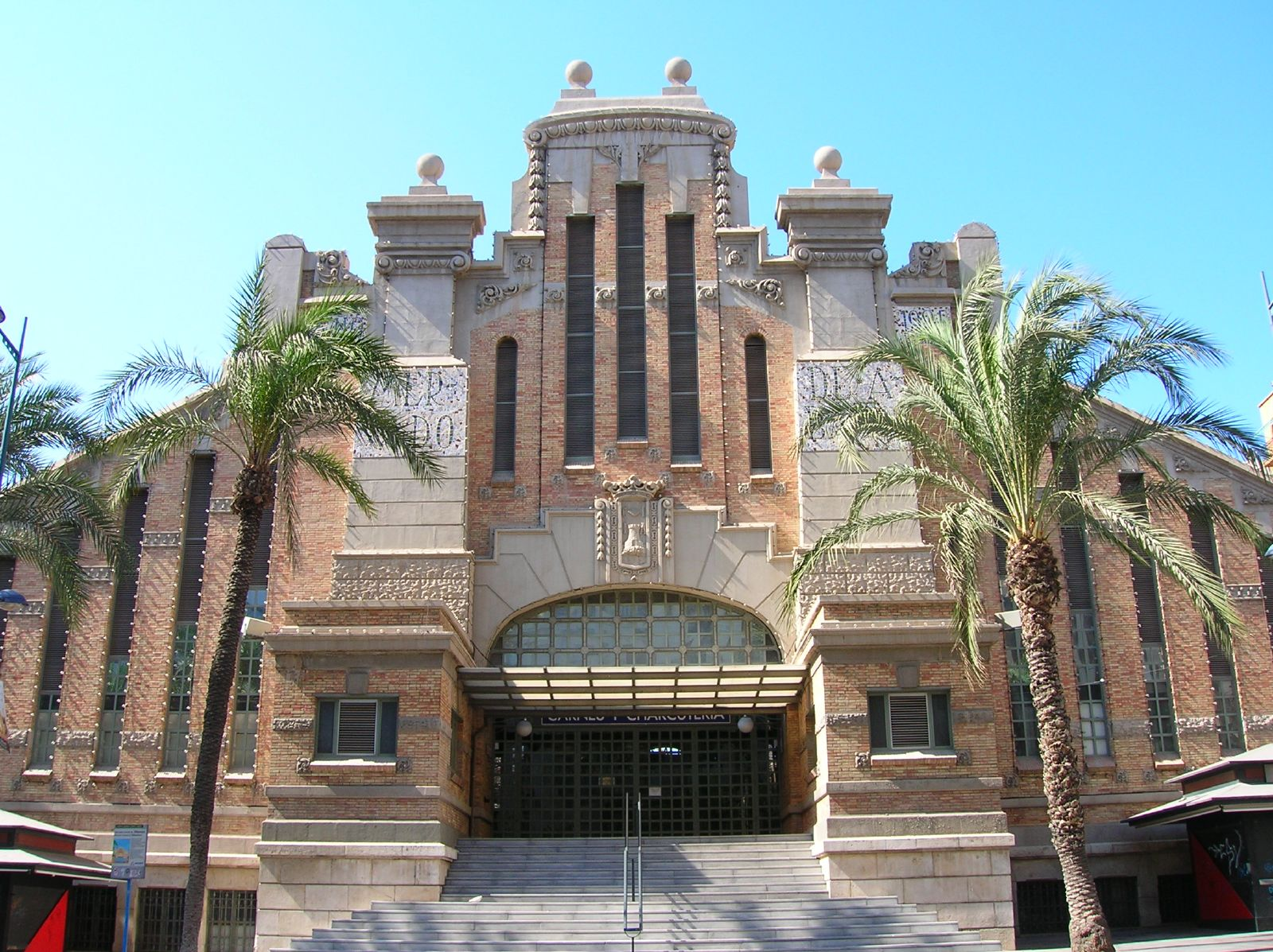
Central Market, in Alicante.

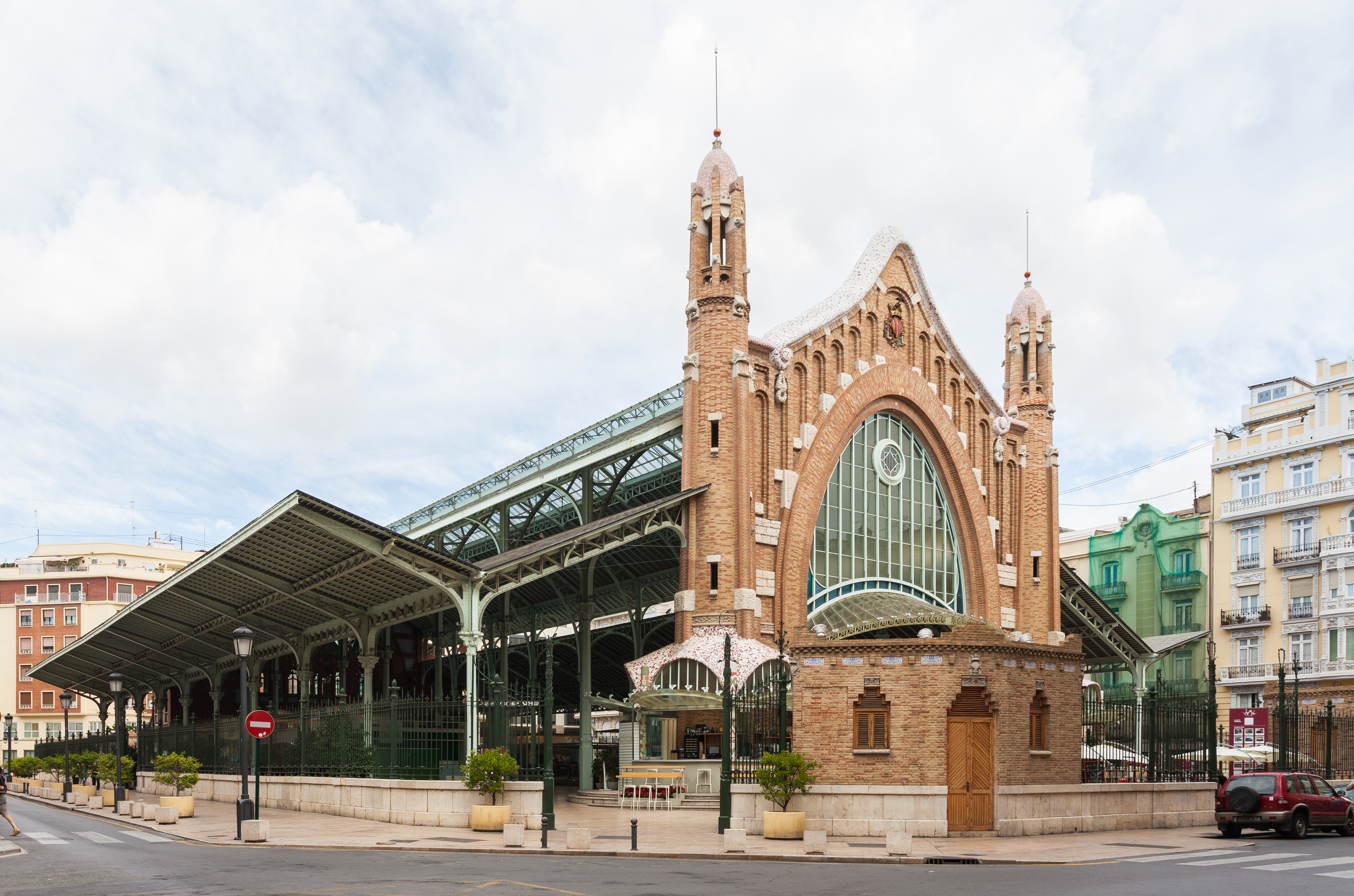
Mercado de Colón, in Valencia.

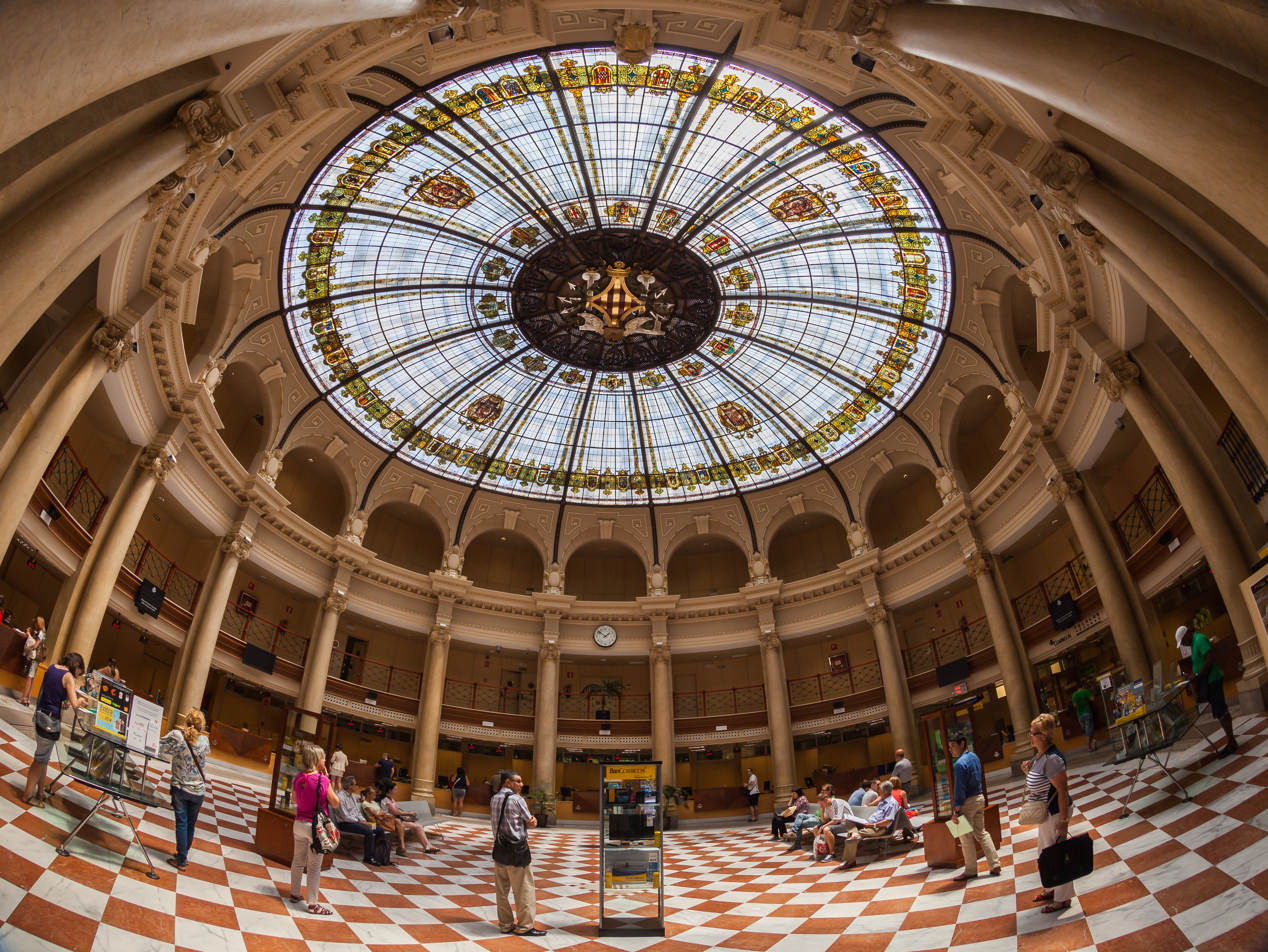
General Post Office of Valencia.

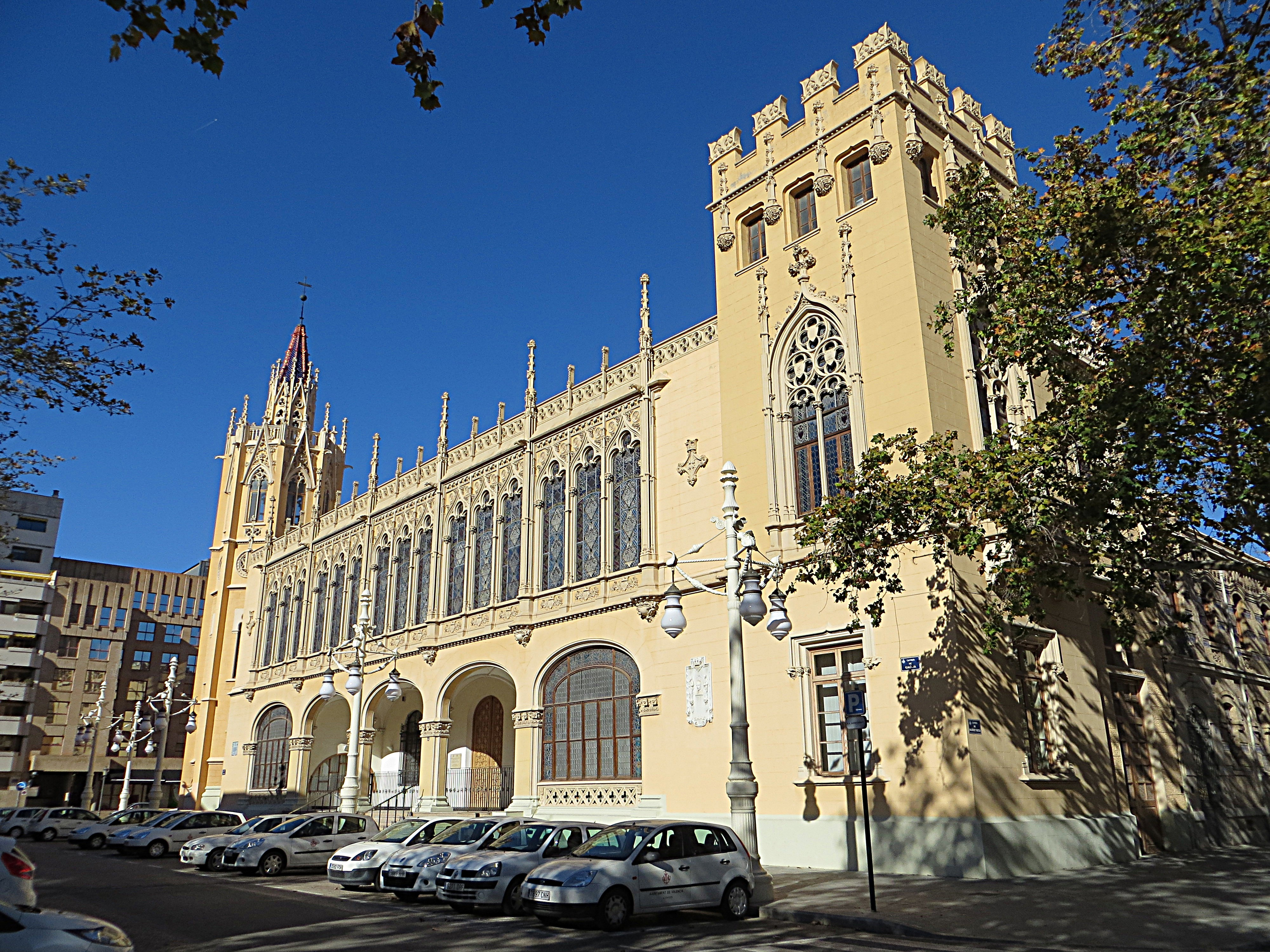
Palace of the Valencian Regional Exposition, in Valencia, 1908.

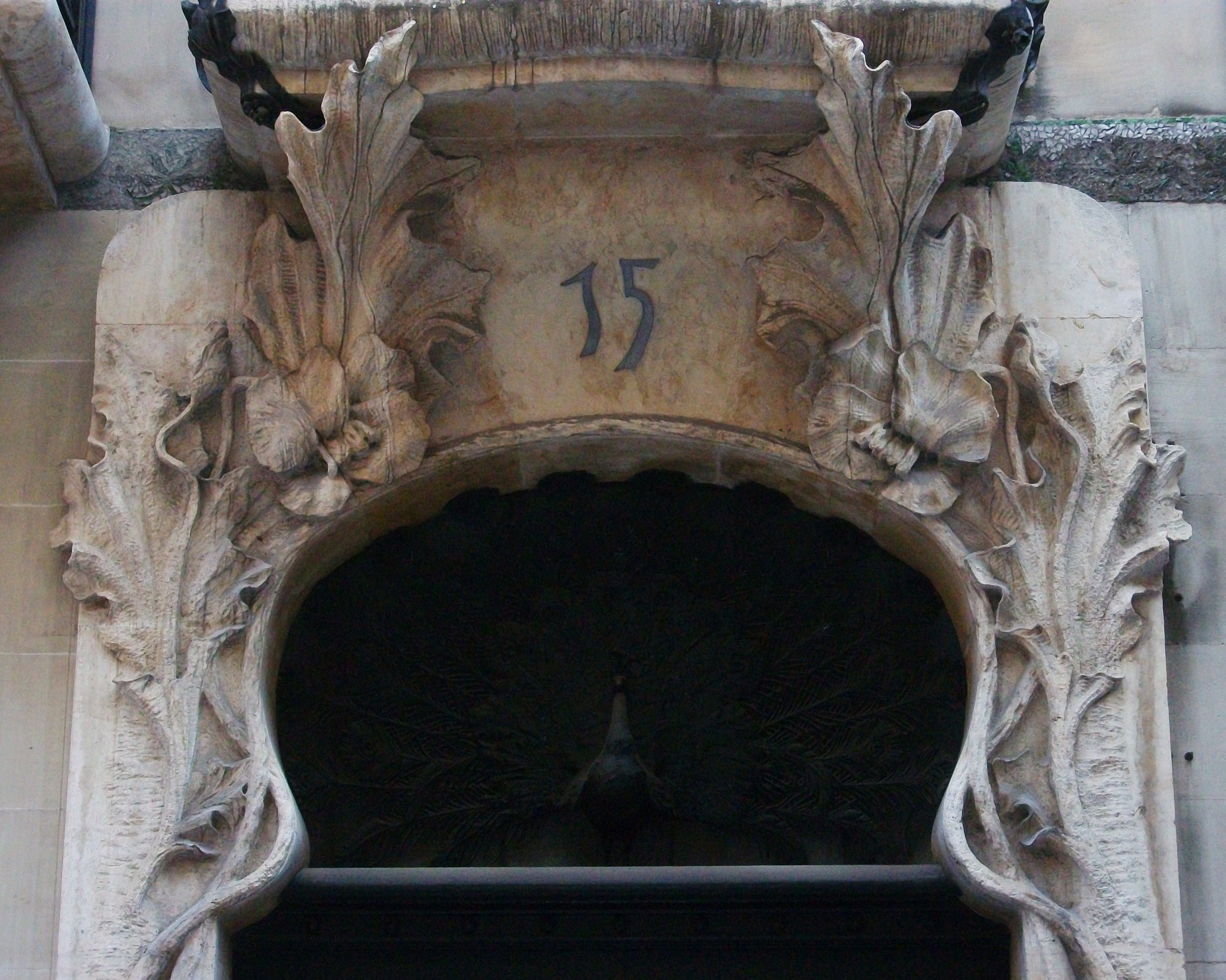
Casa del Pavo, in Alcoy (Alicante).

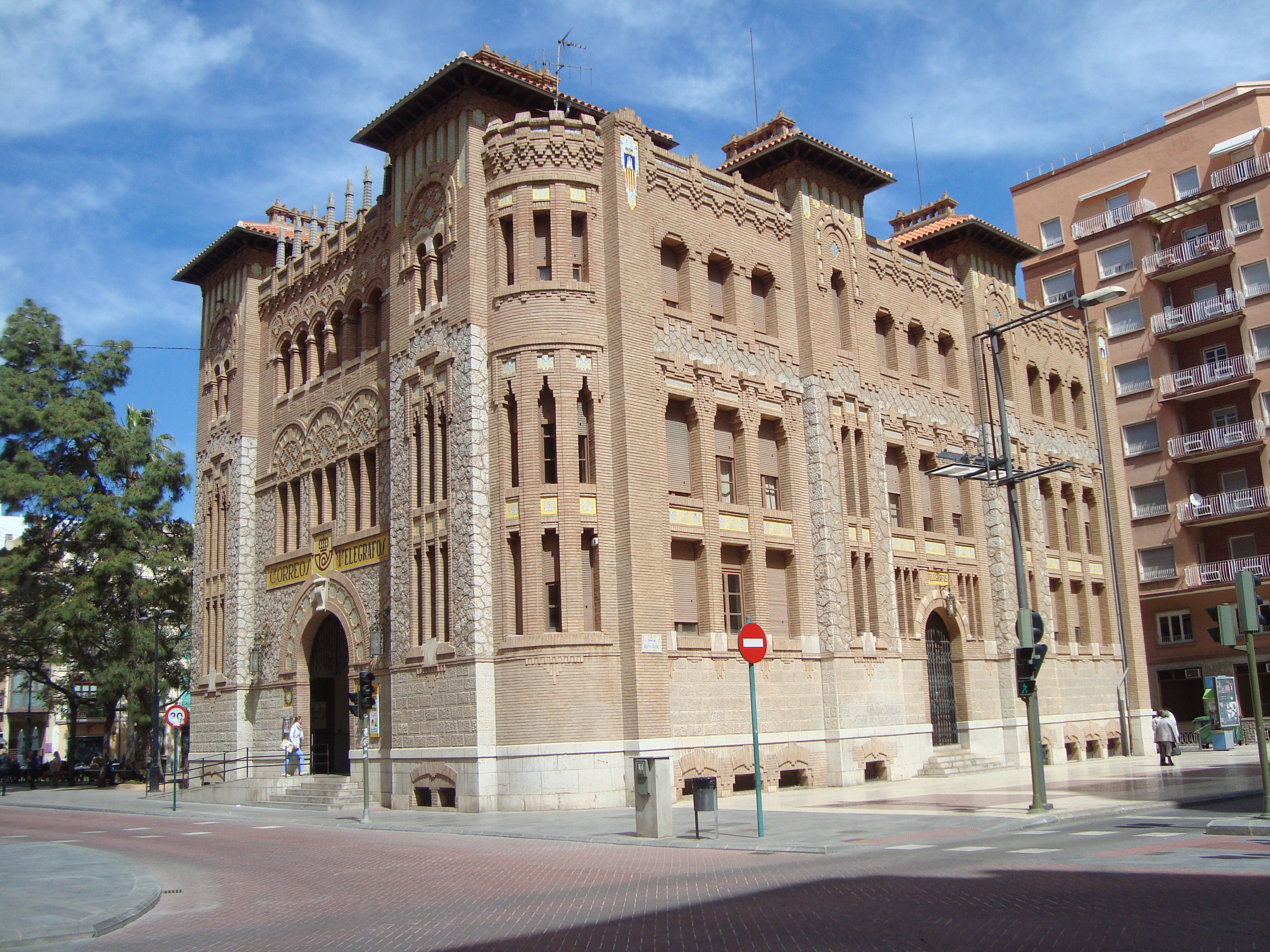
General post office building in Castellón.

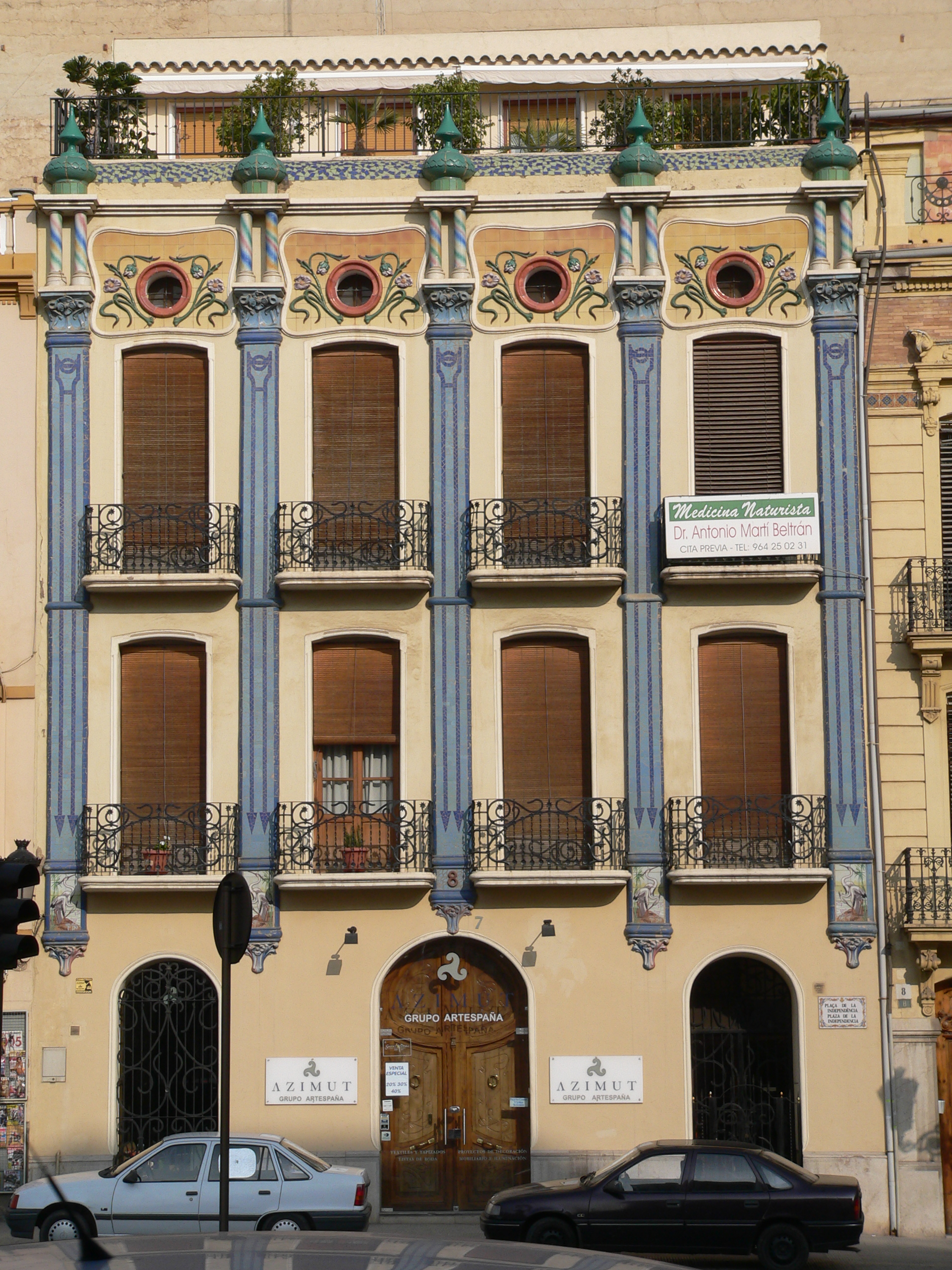
Building de Les Cigonyes, in Castellón.

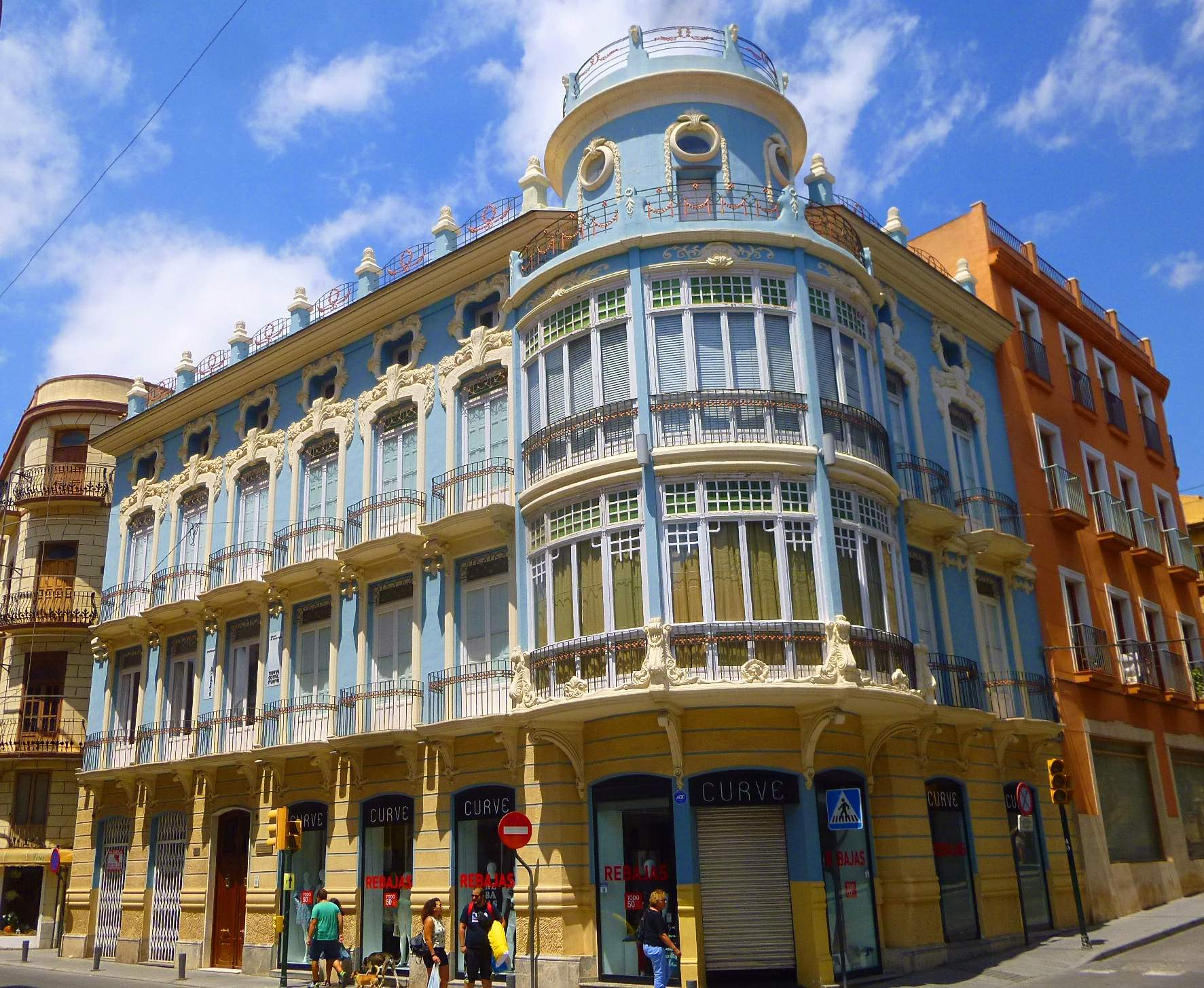
Villaescusa building, in Orihuela (Alicante).

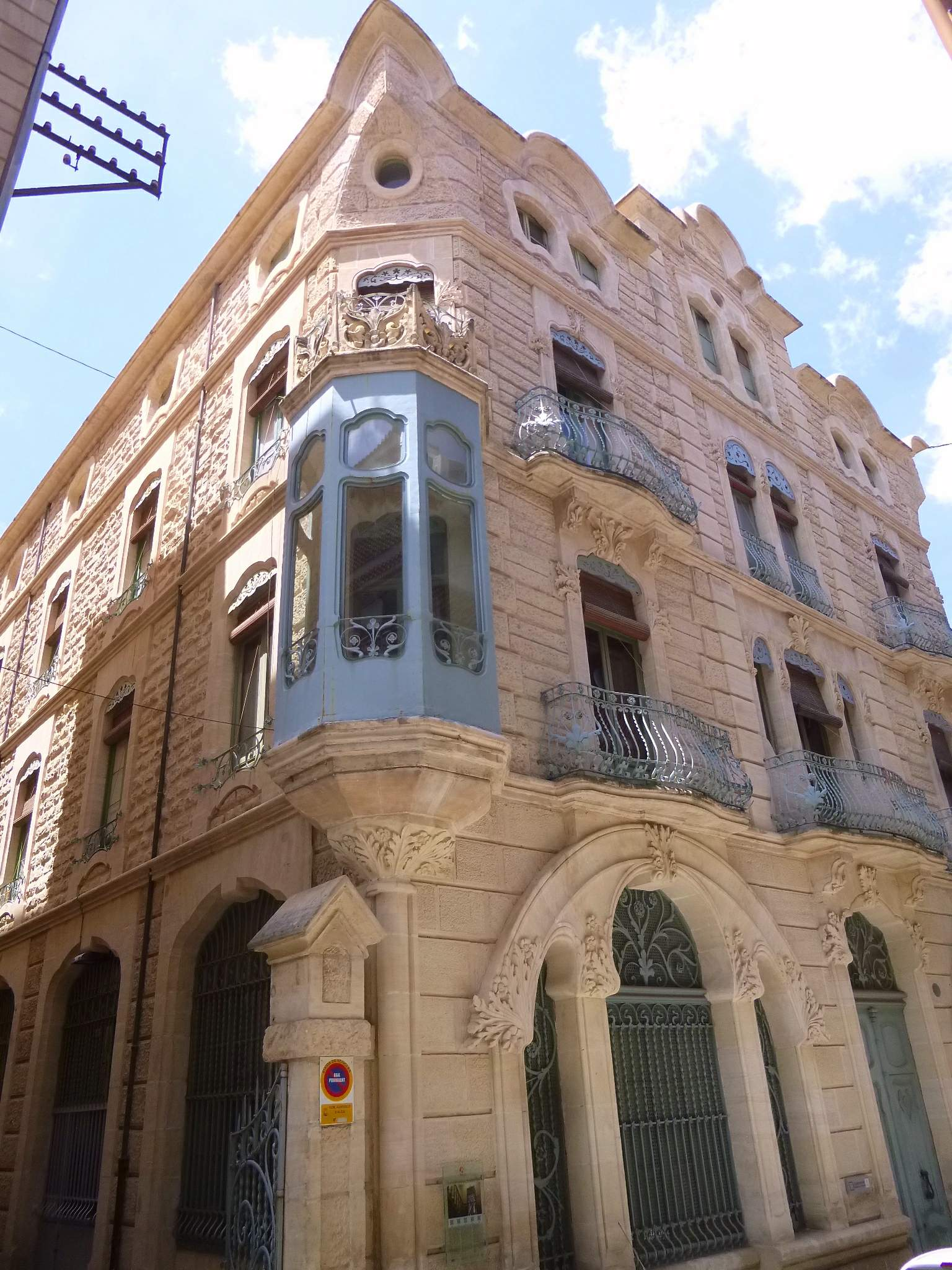
Casa d'Escaló, in Alcoy (Alicante).

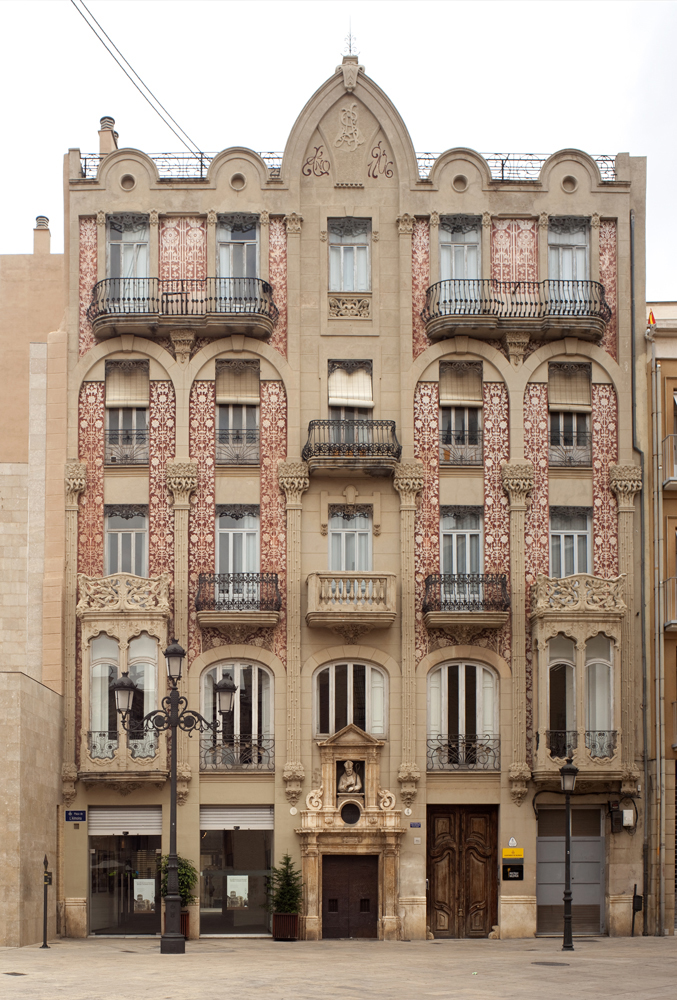
Casa del Punto de Gancho, in Valencia.

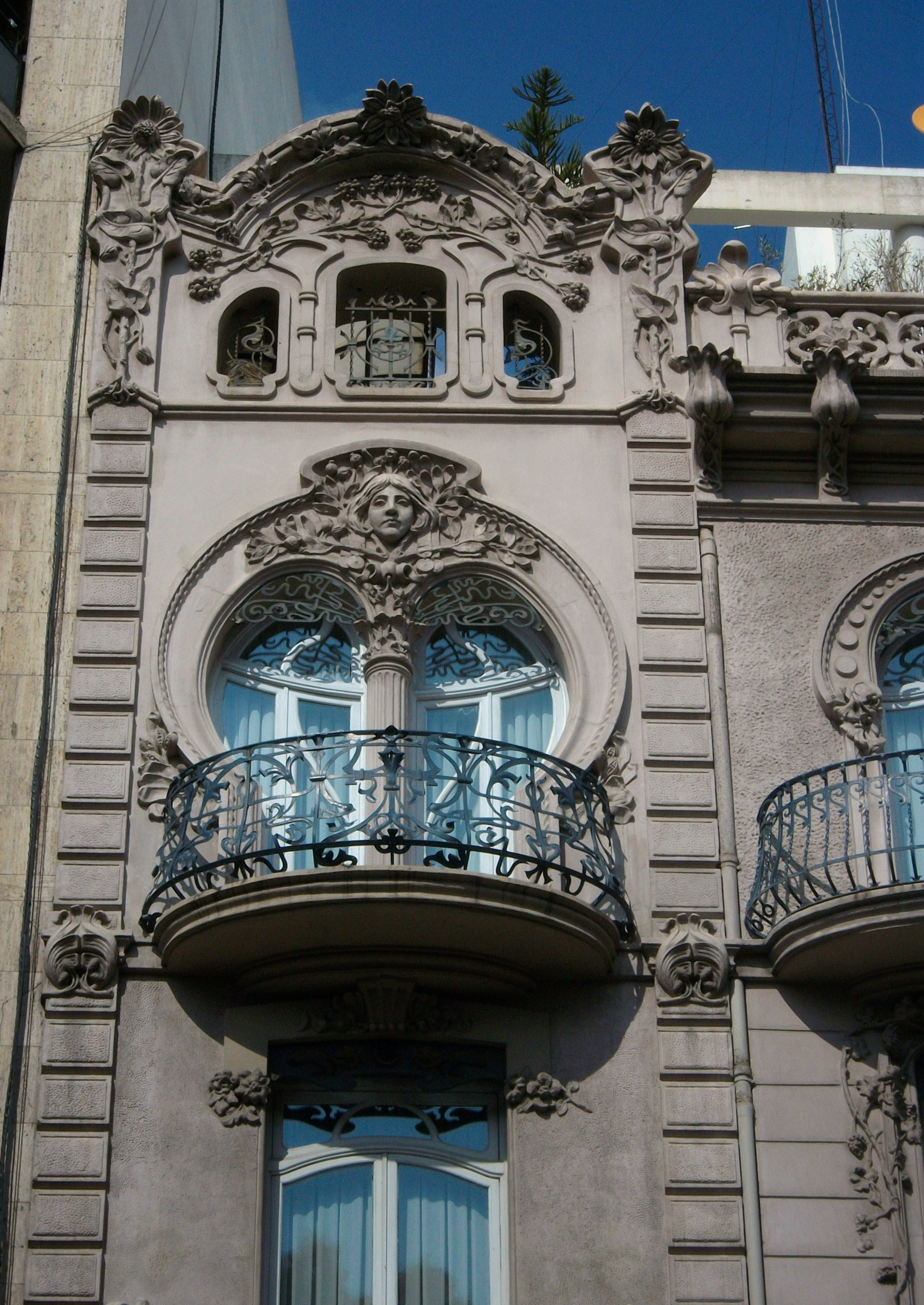
Balcony of the Casa Ortega, in Valencia.

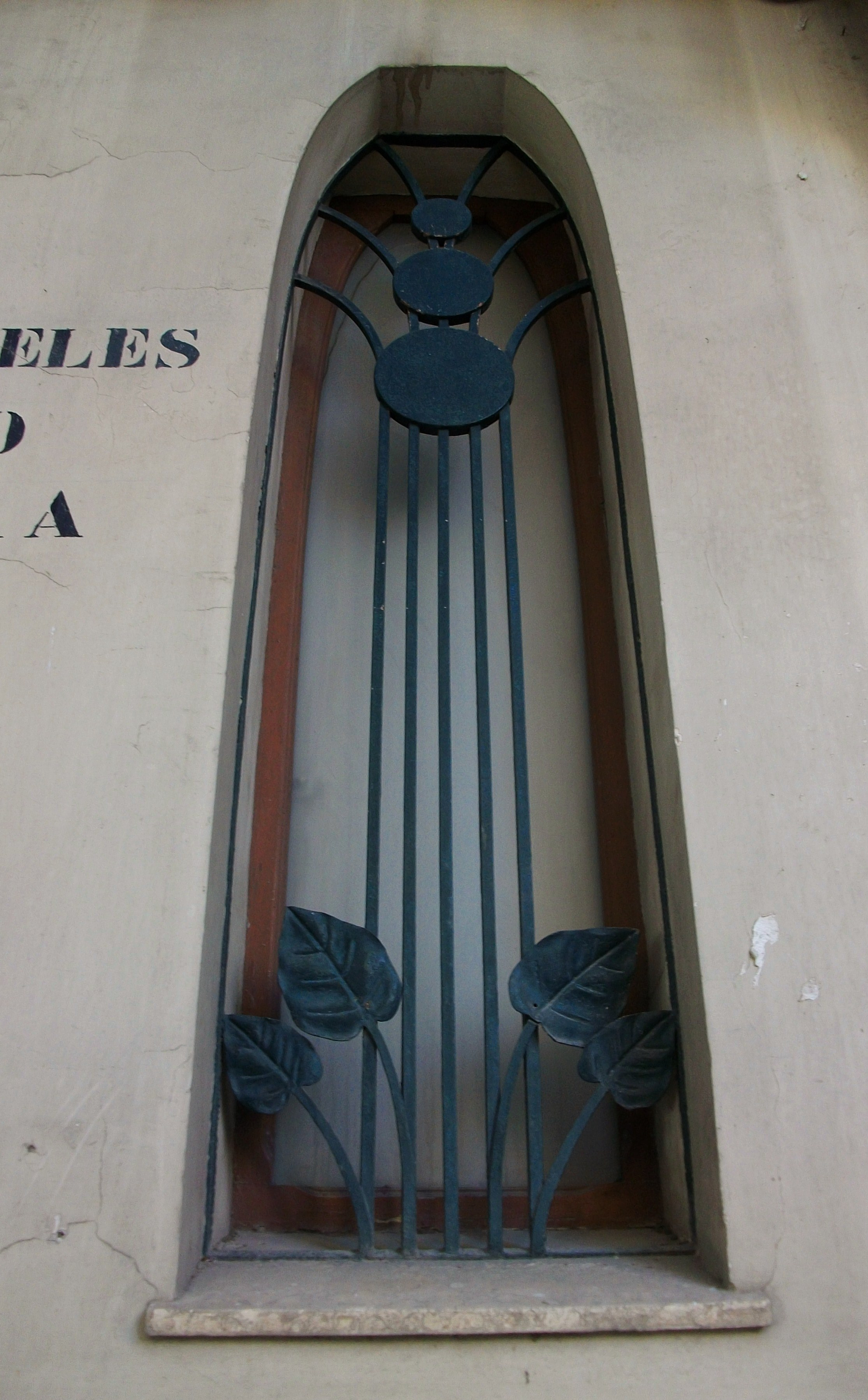
Window of the Ferrer building, in Valencia.

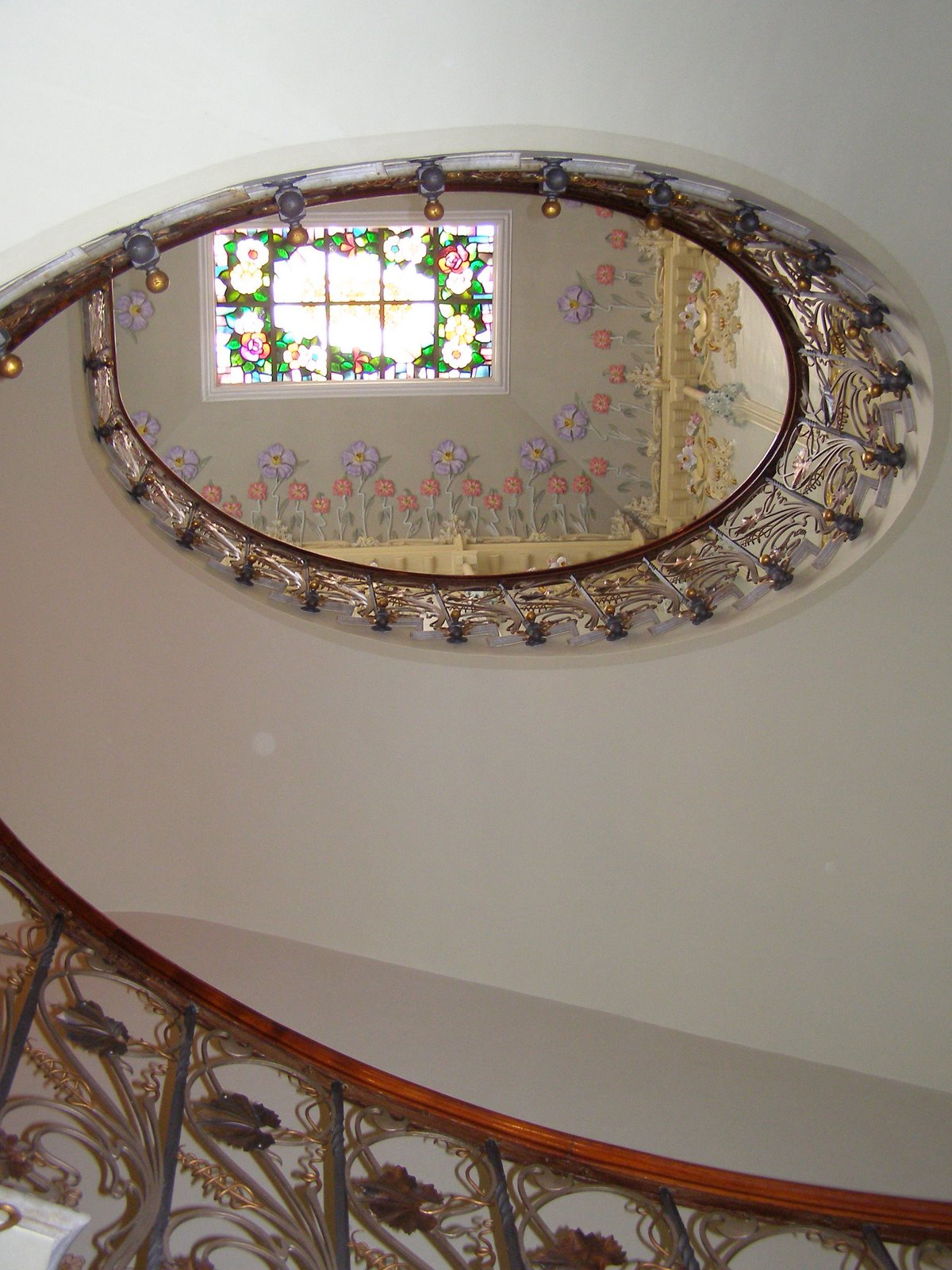
Stairs of the Art Nouveau House-Museum of Novelda (Alicante).

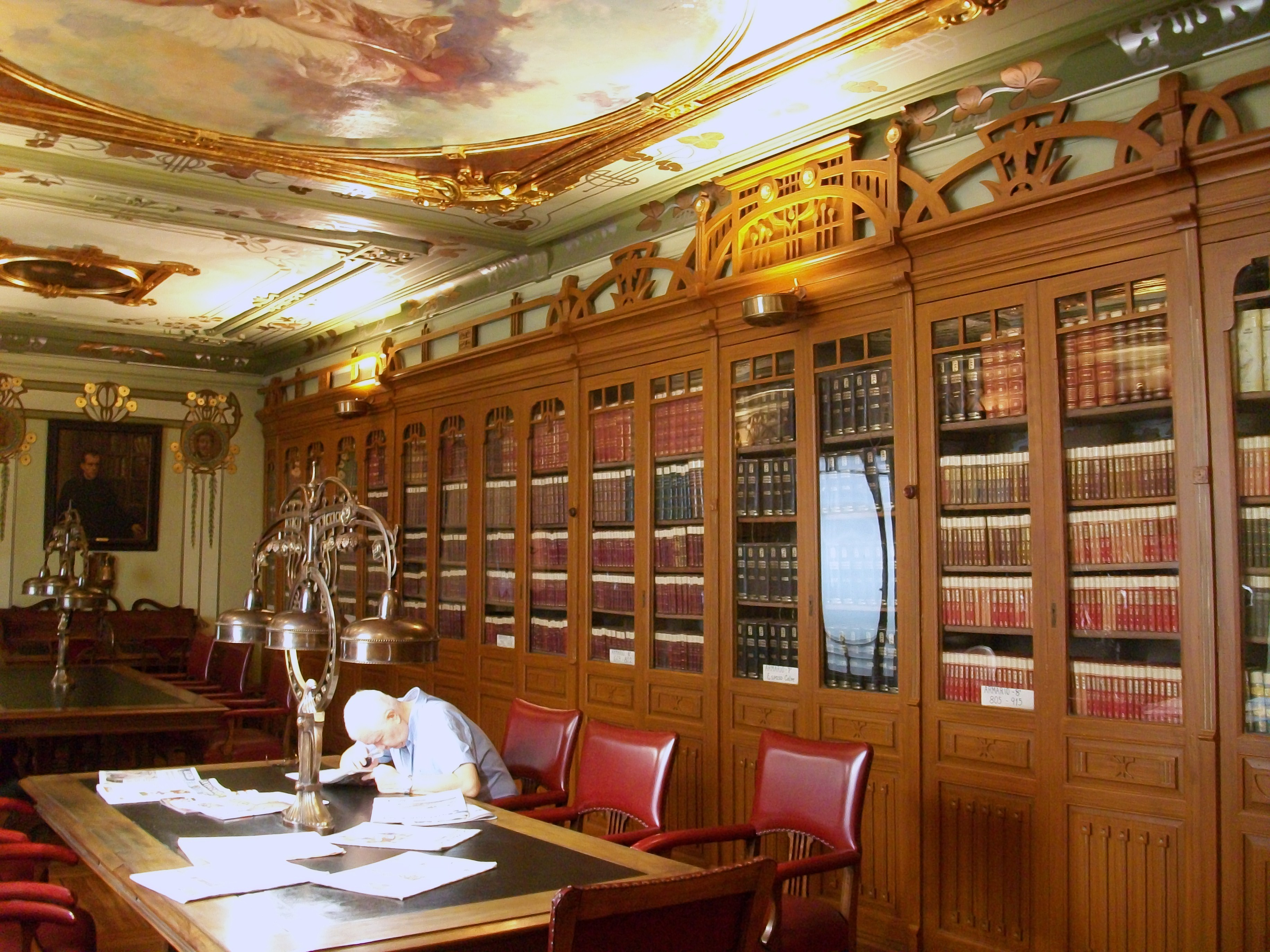
Art Nouveau library of the Circulo Industrial de Alcoy, in Alcoy (Alicante).

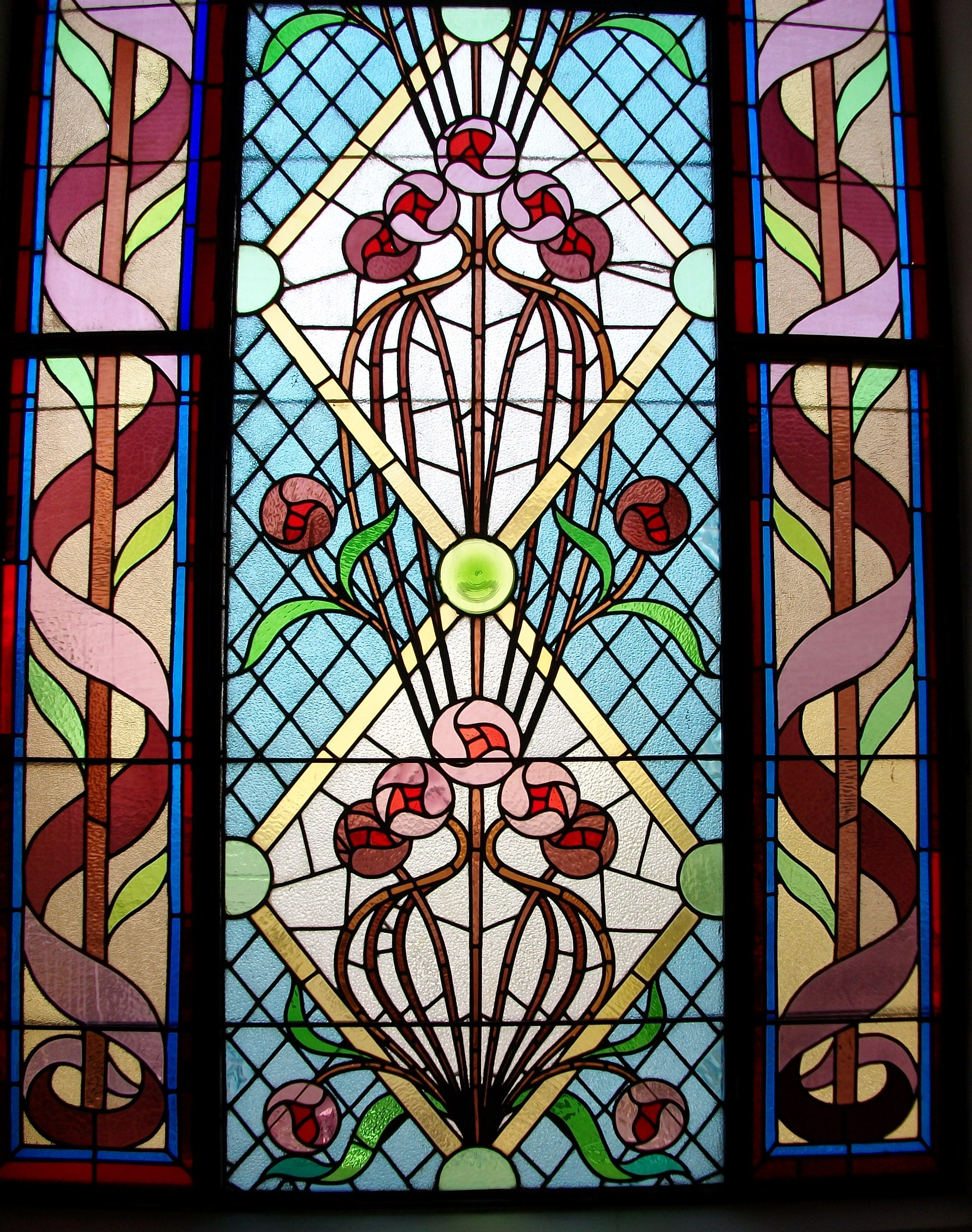
Window of the Palace of the Valencian Regional Exposition, in Valencia, 1908.

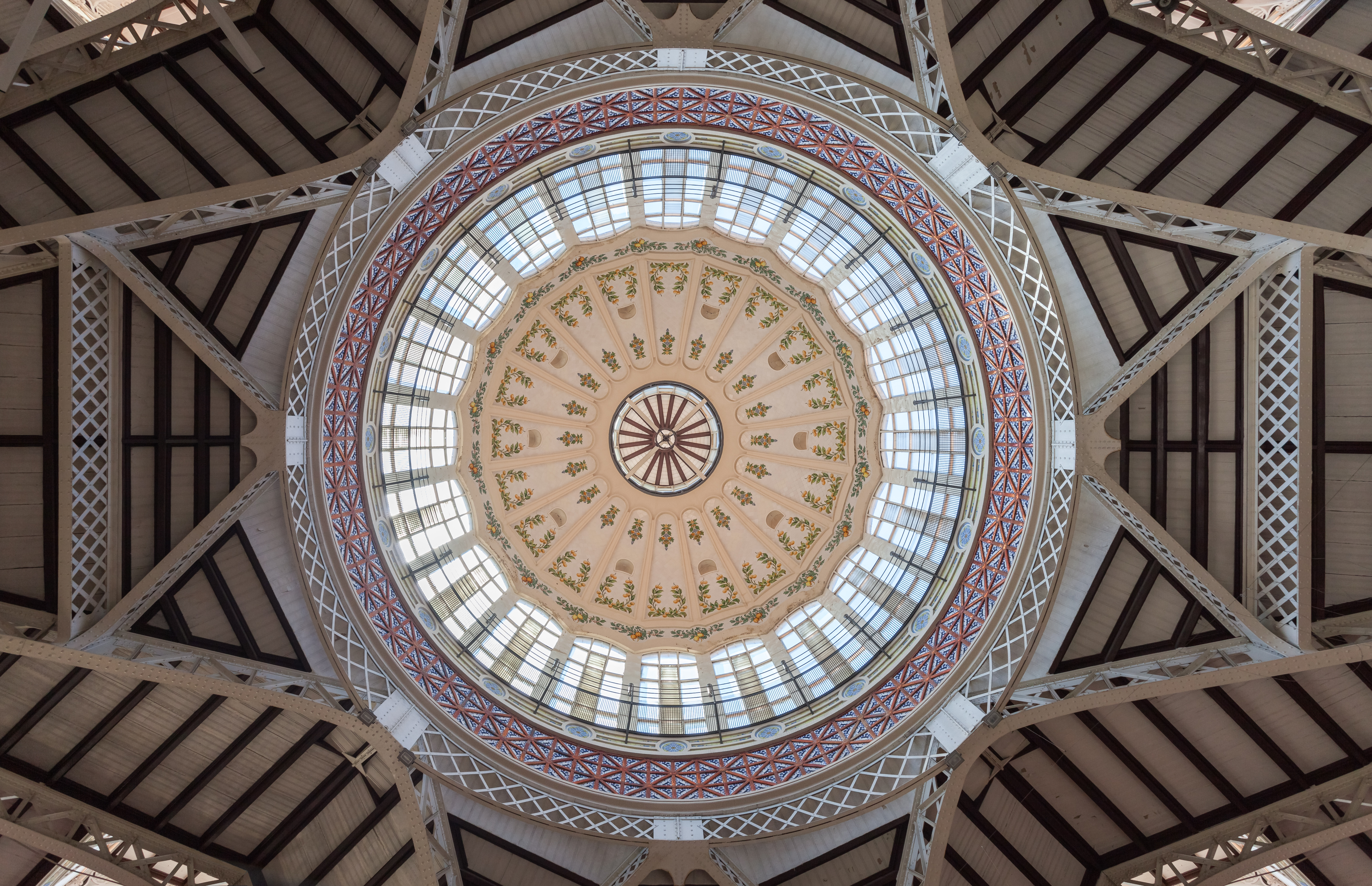
Dome of the Central Market, in Valencia.

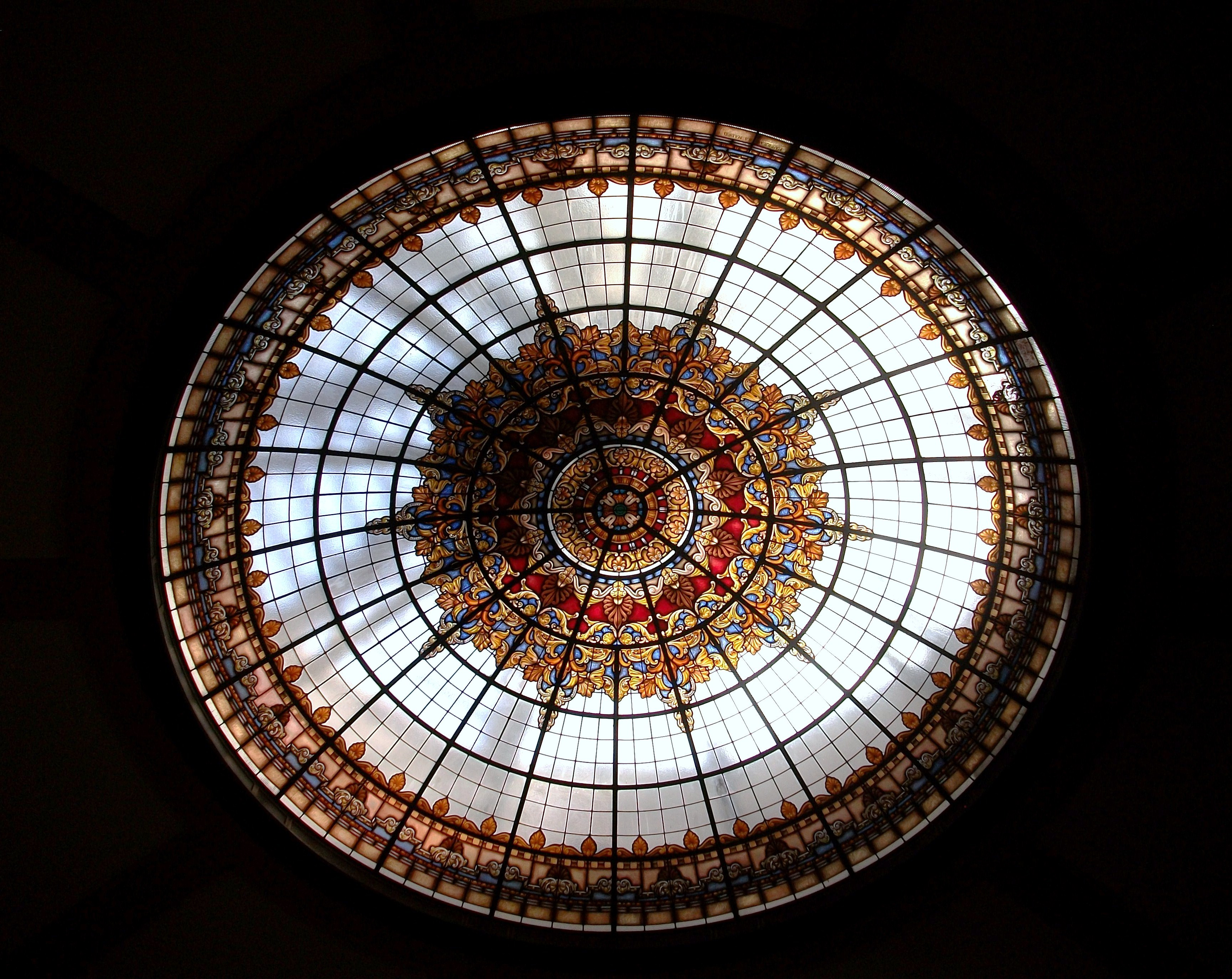
Stained glass window at the Circulo Industrial de Alcoy.

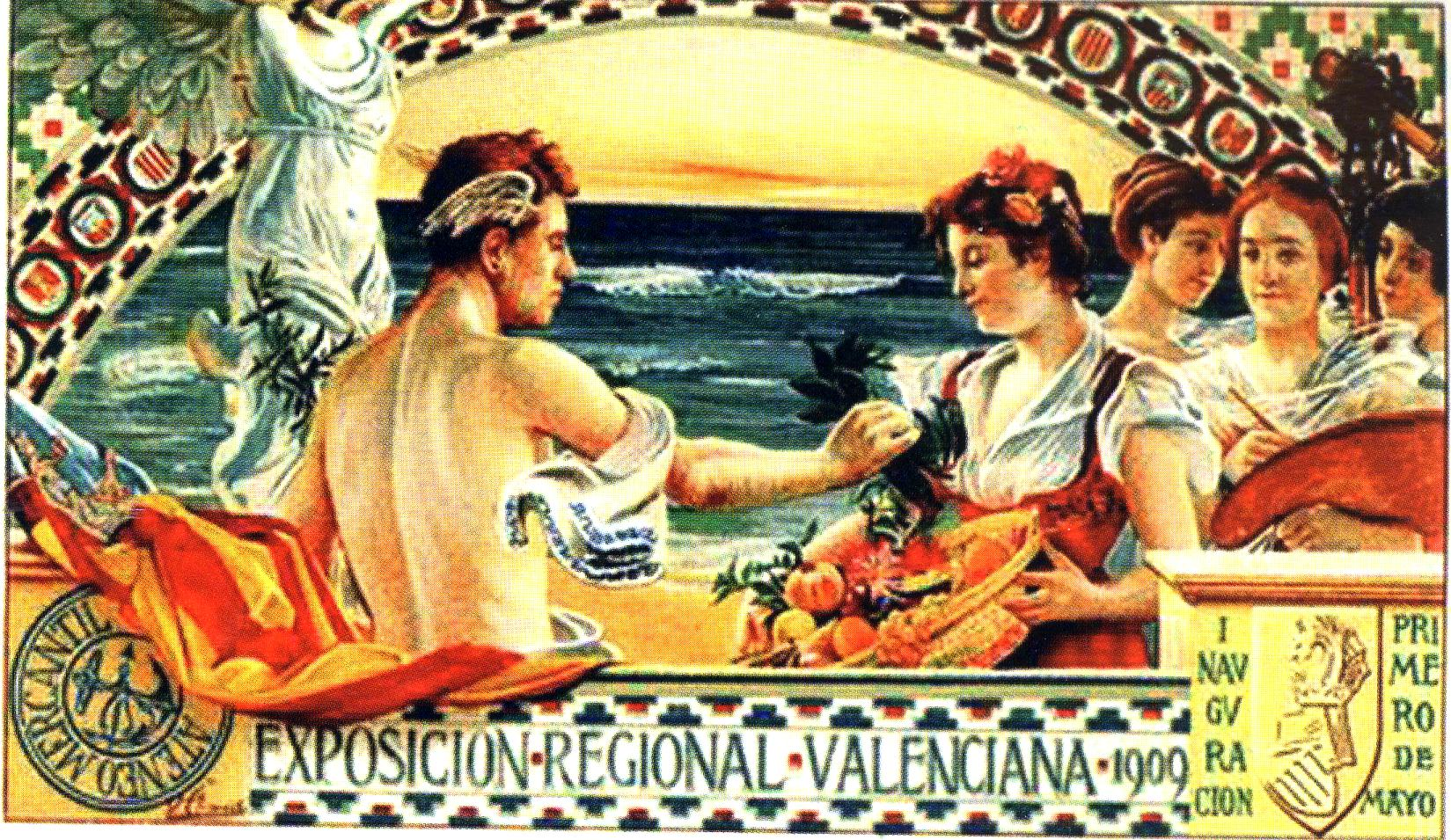
Poster of the Valencian Regional Exhibition of 1909, work of Vicente Climent Navarro.

Valencian Art Nouveau (Spanish: modernismo valenciano, Valencian: modernisme valencià) is the historiographic denomination given to an art and literature movement associated with the Art Nouveau in the Valencian Community, in Spain.

Its main form of expression was in architecture, but many other arts were involved (painting, sculpture, etc.), and especially the design and the decorative arts (cabinetmaking, carpentry, forged iron, ceramic tiles, ceramics, etc.), which were particularly important, especially in their role as support to architecture.

Although Art Nouveau was part of a general trend that emerged in Europe around the turn of the 20th century, in the Valencian Community the trend acquired its own unique personality in the context of spectacular urban and industrial development. It is equivalent to a number of other fin de siècle art movements going by the names of Art Nouveau in France and Belgium, Jugendstil in Germany, Sezession in Austria-Hungary, Liberty style in Italy and Modern or Glasgow Style in Scotland.

The Valencian Art Nouveau was active from roughly 1899 (Art Nouveau reform of the Glorieta Park in Alcoy) to 1917. The Art Nouveau movement in the Valencian Community is best known for its architectural expression, especially in the works of the architects Demetrio Ribes Marco and Francisco Mora Berenguer in Valencia or Vicente Pascual Pastor and Timoteo Briet Montaud in Alcoy, but was also significant in sculpture and painting. Notable painters include Fernando Cabrera Cantó, Francisco Laporta Valor, Emilio Sala, Adolfo Morrió and Edmundo Jordá. A notable sculptor was Lorenzo Ridaura Gosálbez.

On the other hand, there are several Valencian populations who form part of the Art Nouveau European Route, an association of local governments and non-governmental institutions for the international promotion and protection of Art Nouveau heritage. It is the case of Alcoy, Novelda and Sueca.

== Architecture ==
Early 20th century architecture in Valencian Community was strongly influenced by European Art Nouveau. The Valencian Art Nouveau takes place in different cities or areas, inside of a context of great industrial, economic and urban development: Alcoy and Valencia, by number of works, will be the main Valencian cities where much more was developed the art nouveau architecture. Novelda, Alicante, Burriana, Castellón de la Plana or Sueca are other cities with important examples of Valencian Art Nouveau architecture.

With Valencian local architects, all of them formed in Barcelona or Madrid and contemporaries to the Catalan Modernism and to the Art Nouveau of Madrid, but that exercised the main part of his career in the Valencian Community, the Valencian Art Nouveau will receive a special architectural relevancy in different Valencian cities.

The Mercado Central (transl. Central Market) in Valencia, one of the largest in Europe, covers more than 8,000 square metres, over two floors, with a predominantly Valencian Art Nouveau style. Its unusual roof comprises original domes and sloping sections at different heights, while the interior seems to be lined in a range of materials such as iron, wood, ceramics and polychromed tiles. The beauty of the building stands out especially on account of the light that enters through the roof at various points, and through coloured window panels.

The Estación del Norte (transl. North Station) is the main railway station in Valencia located in the city centre next to the Plaza de Toros de Valencia. It was declared Good of Cultural Heritage in 1987.

The Mercado de Colón (transl. Columbus Market) is a public market located in the city center of Valencia. The building was designed by the Valencian architect Francisco Mora Berenguer between 1914 and 1916. This is a clear example of Valencian Art Nouveau architecture of the early century. It was declared a national monument. It impresses with its extraordinary facade and lavish decor.

=== Main buildings of the Valencian Art Nouveau ===
Between the works of the Valencian modernisme stand out:

=== Province of Alicante ===
==== Alcoy (by districts) ====
City Center

- Casa del Pavo
- Casa d'Escaló
- Circulo Industrial de Alcoy
- Casa Laporta
- Campus of Alcoy of the Technical University of Valencia
- Casa Vilaplana
- Casa Briet
- Canalejas Viaduct
- Monte de Piedad y Caja de Ahorros de Alcoy
- Casa Mataix
- Edificio en calle Sant Llorenç 3
- Edificio en calle Sant Llorenç 5
- Edificio en calle Sant Llorenç 27
- Edificio en calle Sant Nicolau 4
- Edificio en calle Sant Nicolau 29
- Edificio en calle Sant Nicolau 35
- Cocheras en plaza Emili Sala 12
- Edificio en avenida País Valencià 30
- Edificio en calle Capellà Belloch 9
- Edificio en calle Sant Josep 26
- Edificios en calle Pintor Casanova 16, 18 y 20
- Edificios en calle Bartolomé José Gallardo 1, 3 y 5
- La Glorieta de Alcoy
- Fábricas en calle Sant Joan 43 y 45
- Edificio del Parque de Bomberos
- Kiosk of Art Nouveau style at the Plaza de la Constitución

Ensanche-Santa Rosa

- Hydroelectrics substation of Alcoy
- Taller de carruajes en calle Agres 5
- Fábrica en calle Agres 8
- Fábrica en calle Alcoleja 4
- Slaughterhouse of Alcoy

El Camí-Zona Alta

- Casa El Camí 1
- Fábrica de "El Rosendo"
- Fábrica en calle Sant Vicent Ferrer 12

Outskirts

- Fuente de El Molinar de Alcoy
- Alcoy Cemetery, Art nouveau pantheons and sculptures.

==== Alicante ====
- Central Market of Alicante
- Lonja del Pescado
- Casa Lamaignere
- Casa Carbonell
- Casa del Ascensor
- Edificio Torrent
- Casa Campos Carrera
- Casa de las Brujas

Novelda:

- Santuario de Santa María Magdalena
- Art Nouveau House-Museum
- Centro Cultural Gómez-Tortosa
- Sociedad Cultural Casino de Novelda
- Casa Mira

Orihuela:

- Casa Villaescusa
- Teatro Circo
- Lonja de Orihuela

Torrevieja:

- Casino de Torrevieja

Villena:

- Chapí Theatre

=== Province of Castellón ===
Les Alqueries:

- Chalé de Safont

Benicarló:

- Casa Bosch

Benicàssim:

- Villa Victoria

Burriana:

- Orange Museum
- Circulo Frutero Burrianense

==== Castellón de la Plana ====
- Edificio de Correos de Castellón
- Casa de les Cigonyes
- Casa Dávalos
- Casa Alcón
- Edificio Academia la Purísima
- Transformador de Viuda de Estela
- Quiosco modernista de la plaza de la Paz

Vila-real:

- Almacén de Cabrera

Vinaròs:

- Casa Giner
- Casa Sendra

=== Province of Valencia ===
Alfafar:

- Sindicato Arrocero de Alfafar

Alginet:

- Market of Alginet
- Slaughterhouse of Alginet

Almàssera:

- Casa Llopis

Alzira:

- Almacén de los hermanos Peris Puig
- Círculo Alcireño

Bocairent

- Hotel L'Ágora

Carcaixent

- Almacén de José Ribera
- Market of Carcaixent
- Casa Vernich
- Casa Talens

Catadau:

- Centro Católico Social

Cullera:

- Market of Cullera

Foios:

- Escuelas Municipales de Foios

Gandia:

- Palace París
- Serrano Theater

Ontinyent:

- Hotel Kazar

Requena:

- Finca Casa Nueva

Sueca:

- Asilo de ancianos de Sueca
- Ateneo Suecano del Socorro
- Casa de Pascual Fos
- Escuelas Jardín del Ateneo
- Casas de Ignacia Cardona
- Slaughterhouse of Sueca

==== Valencia (by districts) ====
Ciutat Vella-City Center

- North Station
- Central Market of Valencia
- Casa Ordeig
- General post office (Correos)
- Edificio Suay
- Casa Noguera
- Casa Ernesto Ferrer
- Casa Boldún
- Casa Bigné
- Hotel Reina Victoria
- Edificio Aznar
- Casa Tarín
- Edificio Lucini
- Casa del Punto de Gancho
- Palacio de Fuentehermosa
- Casa Peris
- Edificio Monforte
- Edificio Sánchez de León
- Casa Sancho
- Edificio Grau
- Edificio Gómez I
- Edificio Gómez II
- Hotel Palace
- Edificio Bolinches
- Edificio Olympia
- Cinematógrafos Caro

L'Eixample

- Mercado de Colón
- Edificio Ferrer
- Edificio Cortina I
- Edificio Francisco Sancho
- Casa Ortega
- Casa de las Golondrinas
- Casa de los Dragones
- Edificio Chapa
- Edificio Cortina Pérez
- Casa de Salvador Llop
- Casa Manuel Peris
- Edificio Peris

Exposició-Mestalla

- Valencia Regional Exhibition
- Light fountain of the Exposición Regional Valenciana
- Bridge of the Exposición Regional Valenciana 1909
- Palace of the Exposición
- Industria Lanera Valenciana
- Edificio de Tabacalera
- Balneario de la Alameda

Port of Valencia-El Cabanyal

- Tinglados del Puerto de Valencia
- Edificio del Reloj
- Casa Calabuig
- Hospital asilo de San Juan de Dios
- Lonja de Pescado del Cabanyal
- El Casinet
- Casa Ribes
- House-Museum Blasco Ibáñez

Ayora

- Palace of Ayora

L'Olivereta-Nou Moles

- Convent of Santa Clara
- Central Eléctrica de Nou Moles

Vilanova de Castelló

- Asilo de Santo Domingo
- Mercado de Vilanova de Castelló

Xàtiva:

- Edificio Botella

=== Valencian Art Nouveau architects ===
The main architects of the Valencian Art Nouveau movement by each city are:

==== Province of Alicante ====
- Alcoy: Vicente Pascual Pastor, Timoteo Briet Montaud, Alfonso Dubé, Enrique Vilaplana Juliá, Jorge Vilaplana Carbonell, José Cort Merita, José Abad Carbonell and Joaquín Aracil Aznar.
- Alicante: Francisco Fajardo Guardiola, Juan Vidal Ramos, Enrique Sánchez Sedeño and José Guardiola Picó.
- Novelda: José Sala Sala and Pedro Cerdán.
- Orihuela: Severiano Sánchez Ballesta
- Torrevieja: José Guardiola Picó
- Villena: José María Manuel Cortina Pérez

==== Province of Castellón ====
- Castellón de la Plana: Demetrio Ribes Marco, Godofredo Ros de Ursinos and José Gimeno Almela.
- Vila-real: José Gimeno Almela

==== Province of Valencia ====
- Alginet: Carlos Carbonell Pañella
- Alzira: Emilio Ferrer Gisbert
- Bocairent: Joaquín Aracil Aznar
- Carcaixent: José Ríos Chinesta
- Catadau: Enrique Viedma Vidal
- Cullera: Luis Ferreres Soler
- Foios: Ramón Lucini Callejo
- Gandia: Víctor Beltrí.
- Requena: Demetrio Ribes Marco
- Sueca: Buenaventura Ferrando Castells and Joan Guardiola.
- Valencia: Francisco Mora Berenguer, Demetrio Ribes Marco, José María Manuel Cortina Pérez, Antonio Martorell Trilles, Vicente Ferrer Pérez, Emilio Ferrer Gisbert, Pelegrín Mustieles Cano, Manuel Peris Ferrando, Alexandre Soler, Francesc Guàrdia i Vial, Enrique Viedma Vidal, Manuel García Sierra, Vicente Rodríguez Martín, Ramón Lucini Callejo, Luis Ferreres Soler, Vicente Sancho Fuster, Carlos Carbonell Pañella, Lucas García Cardona, Francisco Almenar Quinzá, Joaquín María Arnau Miramón, Juan Bautista Gosálvez Navarro, etc.
- Villanueva de Castellón: Joaquín María Arnau Miramón y Carlos Carbonell Pañella.

== See also ==
- Art Nouveau in Alcoy
- Valencian Gothic

== Bibliography ==
- Benito Goerlich, Daniel (1992). Arquitectura modernista valenciana (in Spanish and Valencian). Valencia: Fundación Bancaja. p. 273. ISBN 8487684157.
- Benito Goerlich, Daniel (2007). Modernisme en l'arquitectura valenciana (in Valencian). Valencia: Generalitat Valenciana. p. 416. ISBN 9788448246679.
- Mestre Martí, María. (2007). La arquitectura del modernismo valenciano en relación con el Jugendstil vienés. 1898-1918. Paralelismos y conexiones.. Universitat Politècnica de València.
- De Soto Arandiga, Concepción. (2012). "Arquitectos y arquitecturas modernistas en la ciudad de Valencia 1900-1915. Valencia ante el modernismo" Real Academia de Cultura Valenciana.
- Colomer Sendra, Vicente (2002). Colegio Oficial de Arquitectos de la Comunidad Valenciana, ed. Registro de Arquitectura del Siglo XX en la Comunidad Valenciana (en castellano/valenciano). p. 719. ISBN 84-87233-38-4.
- Doménech Romá, Jorge (2010). Modernismo en Alcoy, su contexto histórico y los oficios artesanales. Editorial Aguaclara. p. 497. ISBN 978-84-613-8233-0.
- Doménech Romá, Jorge (2013). Del Modernismo al Funcionalismo, características y evolución del movimiento modernista, el modernismo en Alcoy y Novelda (casos concretos). Publicaciones de la Universidad de Alicante. p. 224. ISBN 978-84-9717-267-7.
- Jaén i Urban, Gaspar (1999). Instituto de Cultura Juan Gil-Albert, Colegio Territorial de Arquitectos de Alicante, ed. Guía de arquitectura de la provincia de Alicante. p. 311. ISBN 84-7784-353-8.
