= Mercado de Colón =

Coordinates: 39°28′08″N 0°22′6″W

- Mercado de Colón (Spanish); Mercat de Colom (Valencian)
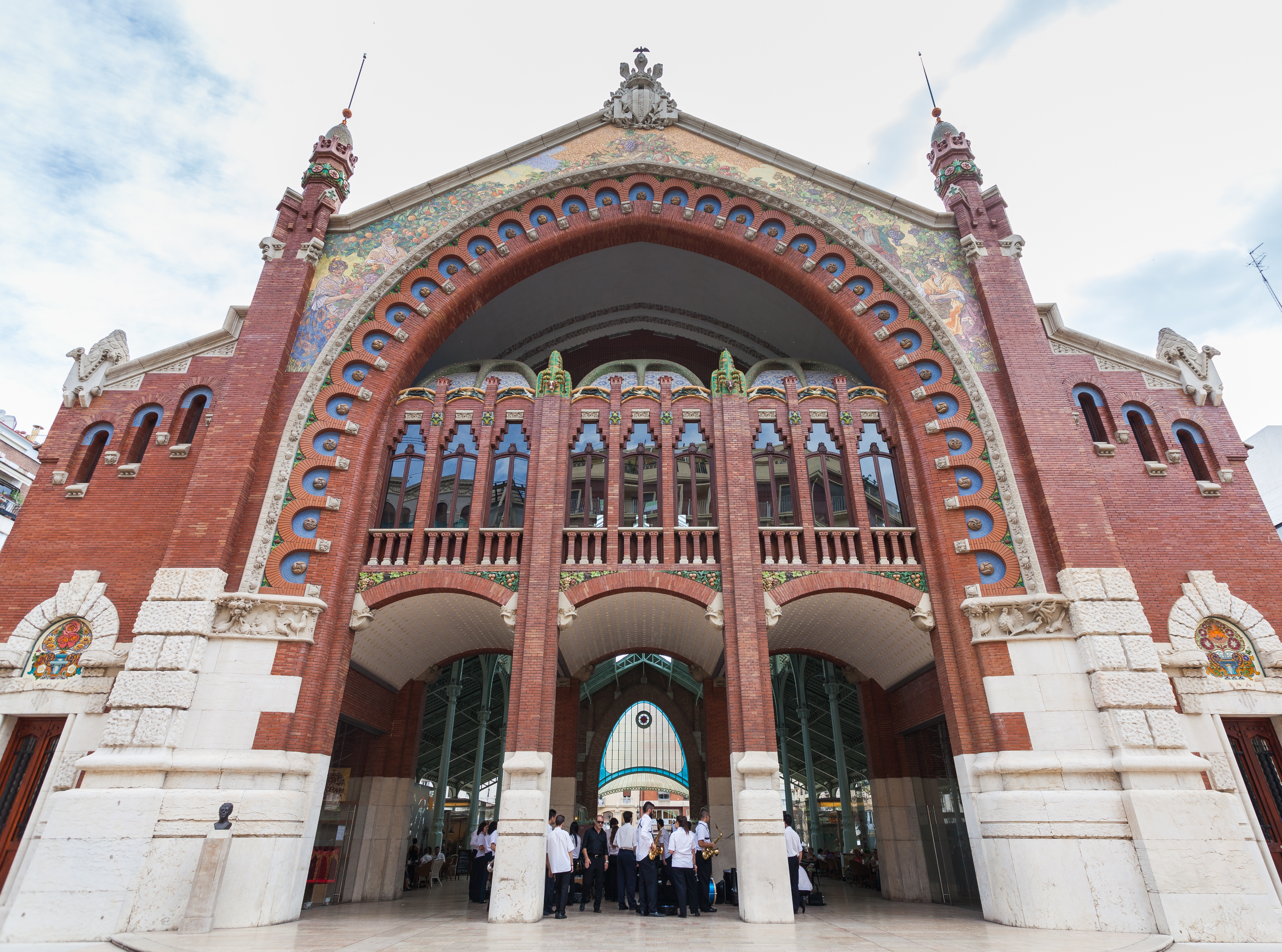
- Interactive map of Mercado de Colón
- Location: Valencia (Valencian Community)

History
- Built: 1914–1916

Site notes
- Architect: Francisco Mora Berenguer
- Architectural style: Valencian Art Nouveau

Spanish Cultural Heritage
- Type: Non-movable
- Criteria: Monument
- Reference no.: RI-51-0008310

Mercado de Colón or Valencian: Mercat de Colom (Columbus Market) is a public market located in the city center of Valencia, Spain. It is one of the main works of the Valencian Art Nouveau.

== Building ==
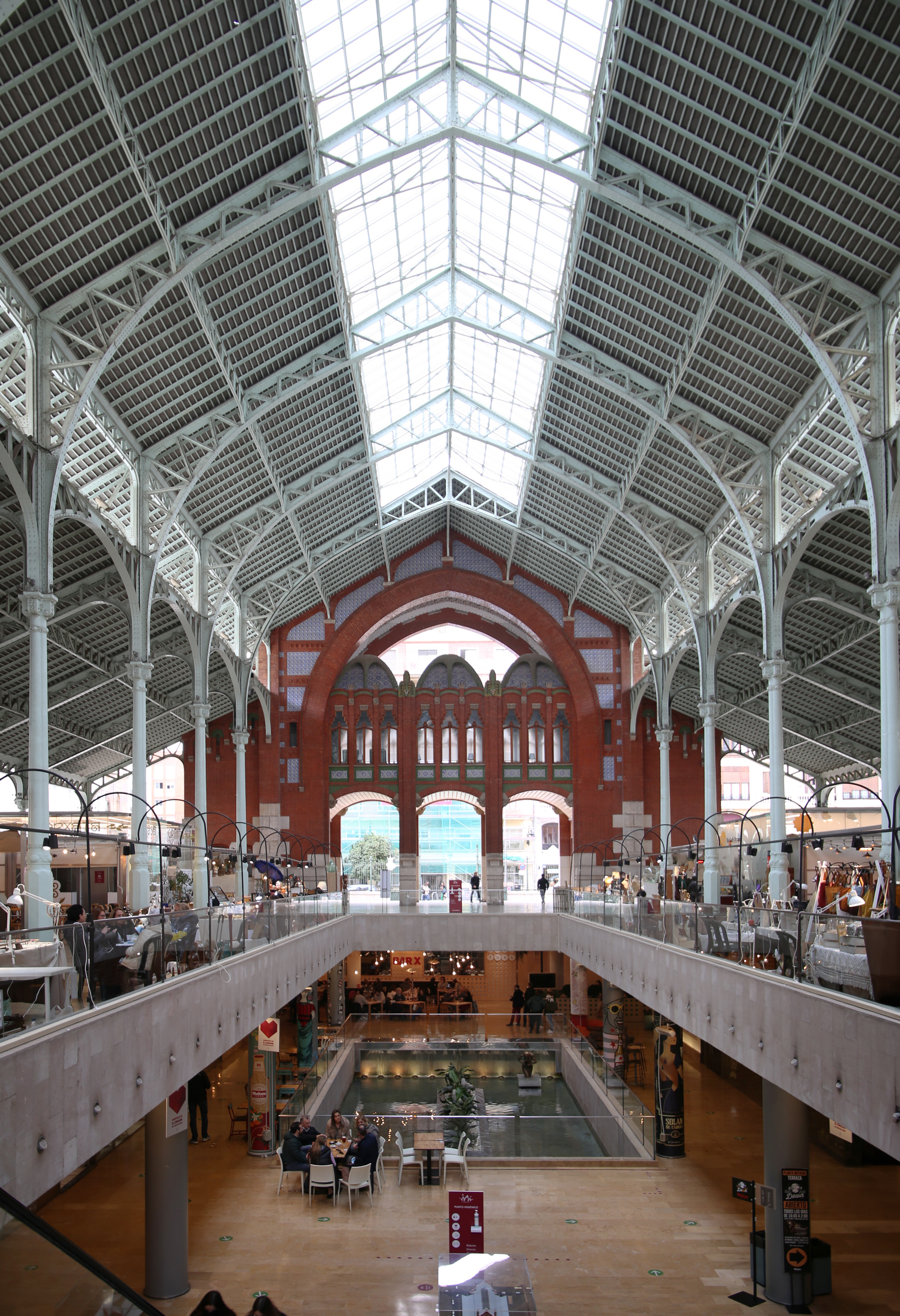
Interior.

The building was designed by the Valencian architect Francisco Mora Berenguer between 1914 and 1916. It is a clear example of Valencian Art Nouveau architecture of the early century. It was declared national monument. It impresses with its extraordinary facade and lavish decor.
