= Casa de los Dragones =

Historical landmark in the Spanish exclave of Ceuta

House of the Dragons
- Casa de los Dragones
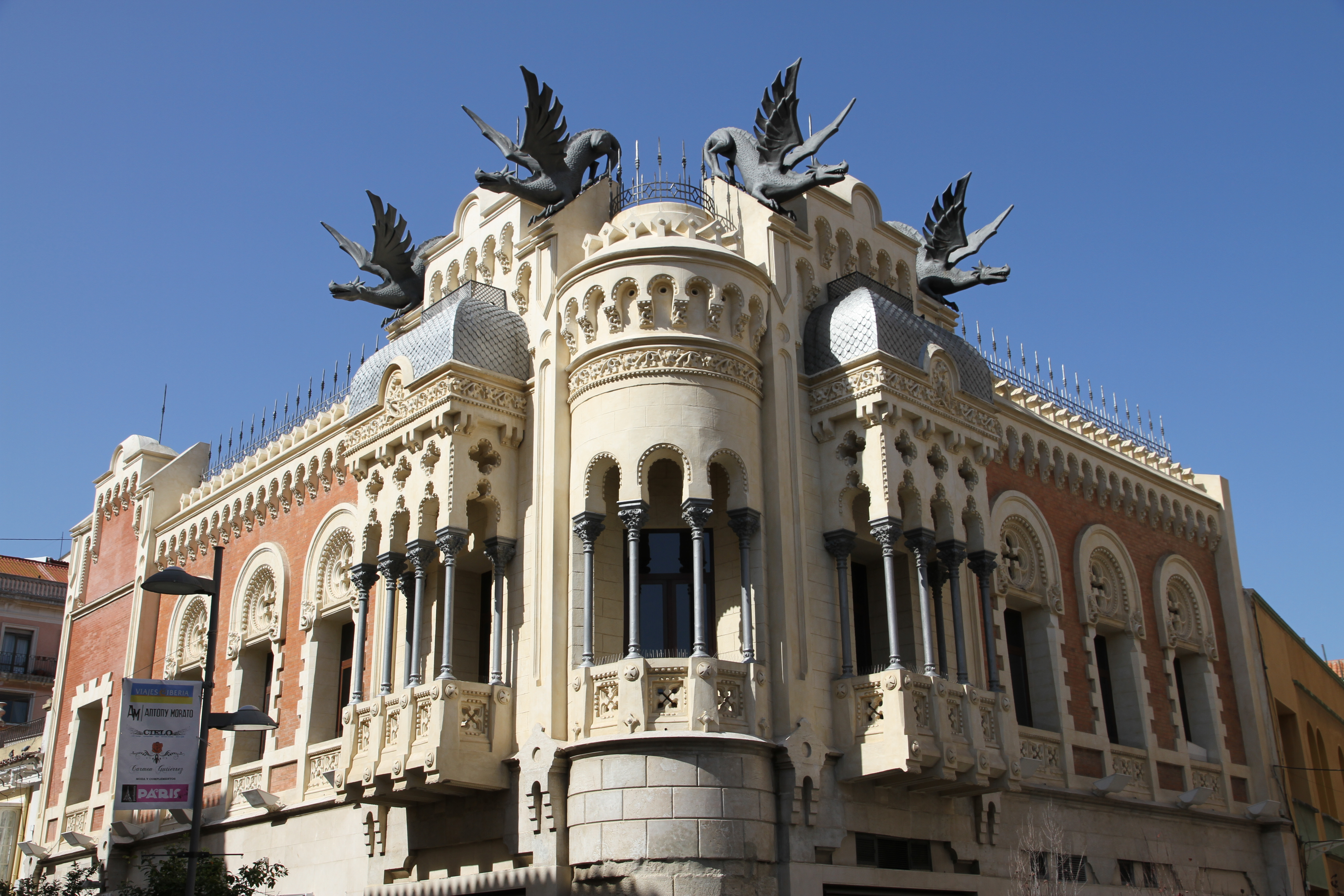
- Casa de los Dragones
- Interactive map of the House of the Dragons area

General information
- Architectural style: Eclectic
- Location: Ceuta, Spain
- Coordinates: 35°53′15″N 5°18′32″W
- Construction started: 1897; 129 years ago
- Completed: 1905; 121 years ago

Technical details
- Floor count: 3

Design and construction
- Architect: José María Manuel Cortina Pérez

House of the Dragons (Spanish: Casa de los Dragones) is a landmark in the Spanish exclave of Ceuta on the north coast of Africa, and an example of eclectic architecture. The house is on a corner of Kings Square.

== History ==
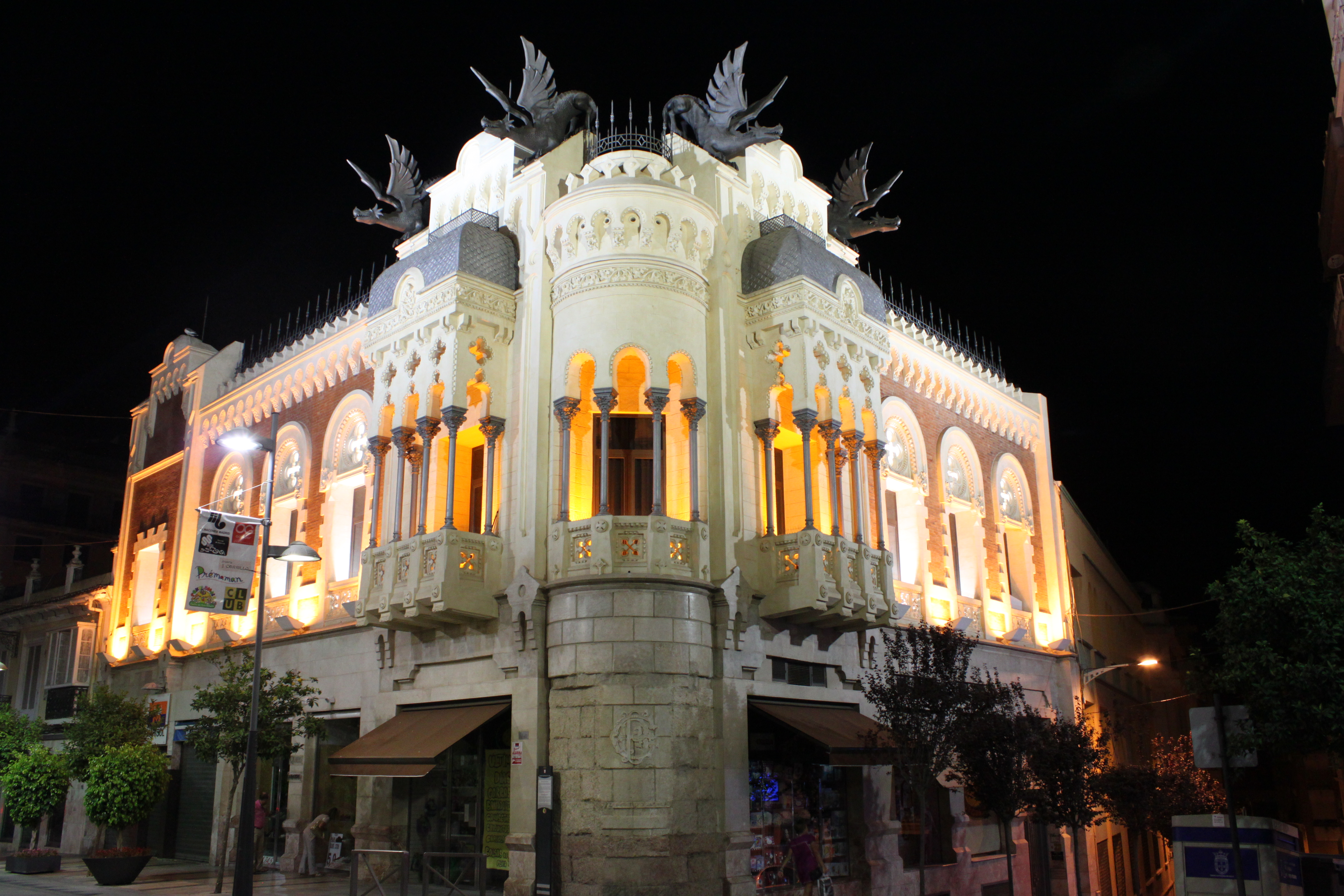
The dragons at night

Commissioned in 1900 by Francisco Cerni González, Mayor of Ceuta between 1897 and 1903, in partnership with his brother Ricardo, the building was designed by Valencian architect José M. Cortina Pérez and completed in 1905.

Perez was an eclectic architect who designed the bottom of the building from artificial stone, and as a pièce de résistance adorned the roof with bronze dragons. The house is on the corner of Paseo de Camoens and Millán Astray Street in Kings Square.

The building was meant to take the name of the Cerni González brothers, but it became known as the House of the Dragons. This is a similar name to one of the architect's 1901 works in his home town of Valencia which is called the Building of the Dragons. The Valencia house also incorporates dragons, although more subtly, which also gives that house its name.

The next owners of the house were the sons of Ricardo Cerni González. The Spanish Falange party had their offices here after the 1936 revolution. The house was sold in 1946. The facade was repaired at the expense of Salomón Benhamú Roffé in 1973 and 1996.

The original dragons were removed in 1925 and lost, but four new dragons have been designed by Antonio Romero Vallejo. Made largely of resin and fiberglass which is painted to appear bronze, the new dragons consequently weigh less than 200 kg each. They were installed and formally opened in November 2006.

Vallejo is a local artist who was born in 1958. He is also responsible for the bronze Tribute to the Artillery which is outside the walls on Avenida Martinez Catena in Ceuta.
