= Church of Santos Juanes, Valencia =

Coordinates: 39°28′27″N 0°22′45″W

Church of Santos Juanes
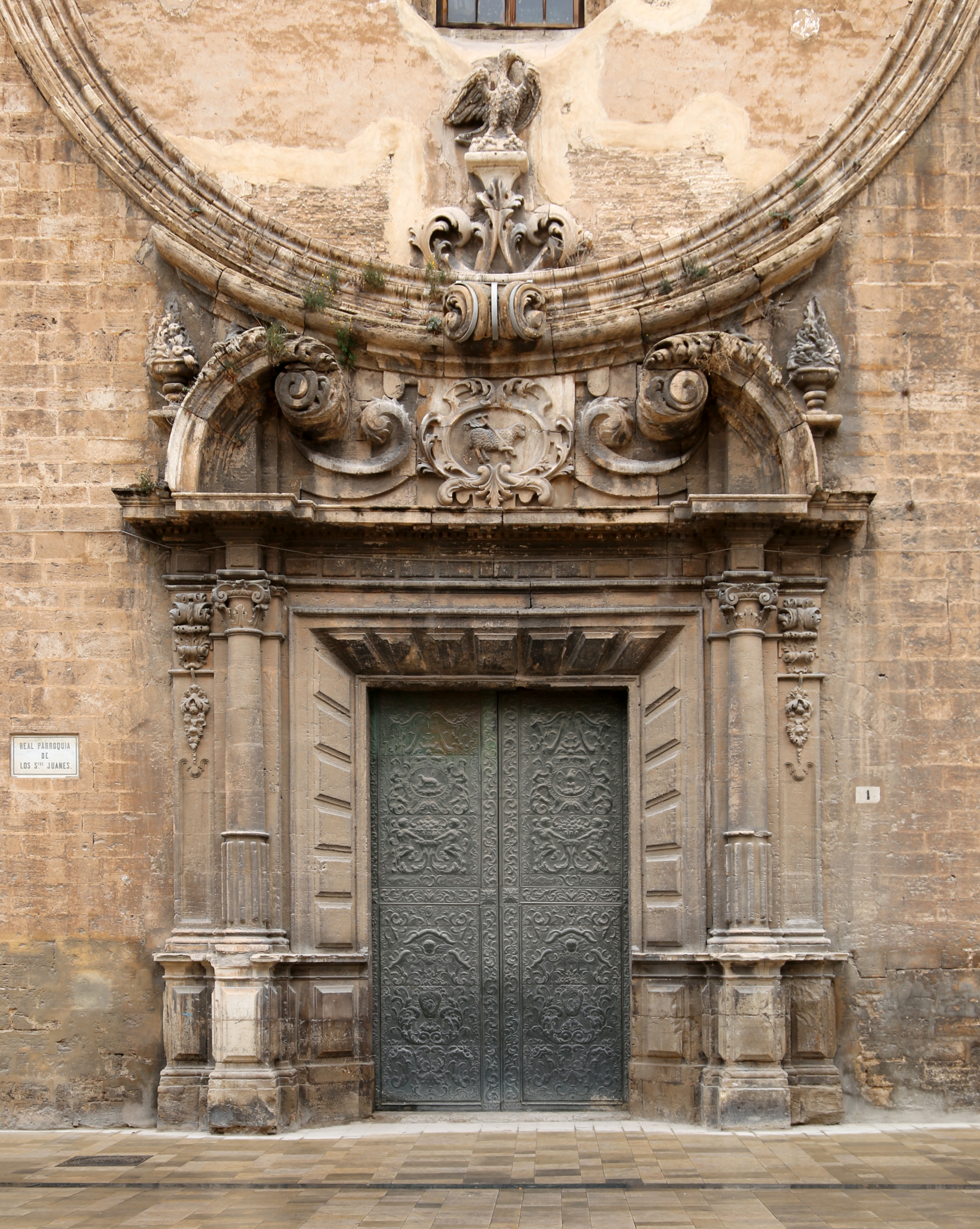
- Church of Santos Juanes
- Location: Valencia
- Address: Plaza del Mercado
- Country: Spain
- Denomination: Catholic Church

History
- Status: Church
- Founded: 13th century
- Dedication: John the Baptist; John the Evangelist

Architecture
- Architectural type: Church architecture
- Style: Spanish Baroque; Valencian Gothic

Administration
- Archdiocese: Valencia

The Church of Santos Juanes or Sant Joan del Mercat is a Catholic church located in the Mercat neighborhood of the city of Valencia, Spain. The church is also denominated the Real Parroquia de los Santos Juanes (Royal Parish of the St Johns) or San Juan del Mercado (Sant Joan del Mercat in Valencian or St John of the Market) due to its location adjacent to the city Central Market and facing the Llotja de la Seda building.

By the mid-13th century, a church was built atop the site of a former mosque, initially in a Gothic style; however, fires in the 14th century necessitated reconstruction. A major fire in 1592 led to another reconstruction, commissioned by the Archbishop and Viceroy Juan de Ribera in an exuberant Baroque style completed in 1700. This was located in the Boatella neighborhood, then working class quarters, outside the town walls, that housed some of the Morisco population.

The main facade of the church retains a walled-up oculus of a rose window from the older church. The square exterior of the apse, facing the piazza, houses a central niche decorated with a stucco statuary group of the Virgen del Rosario (Virgin of the Rosary) attributed to Jacopo Bertesi. The group display the Virgin and Child (his hand on the globe) ensconced in a burst of rays, angels, and cherubs. Other portals contain the symbols of John the Baptist (lamb) and John the Evangelist (eagle). The center is surmounted by a clock tower, and a roofline dominated by statues of the Juanes: including the Baptist, the Evangelist, and Saints Francesco Borgia and Luis Bertrán. This facade includes profuse complex iconography including a lamb atop a book with five seals.

The interior has statues depicting the 12 tribes of Israel, also by Bertesi, and large ceiling frescoes depicting numerous themes of the Church Triumphant by Antonio Palomino. The church interiors, including the frescoes, suffered arson damage during the Spanish Civil War.

== Gallery ==
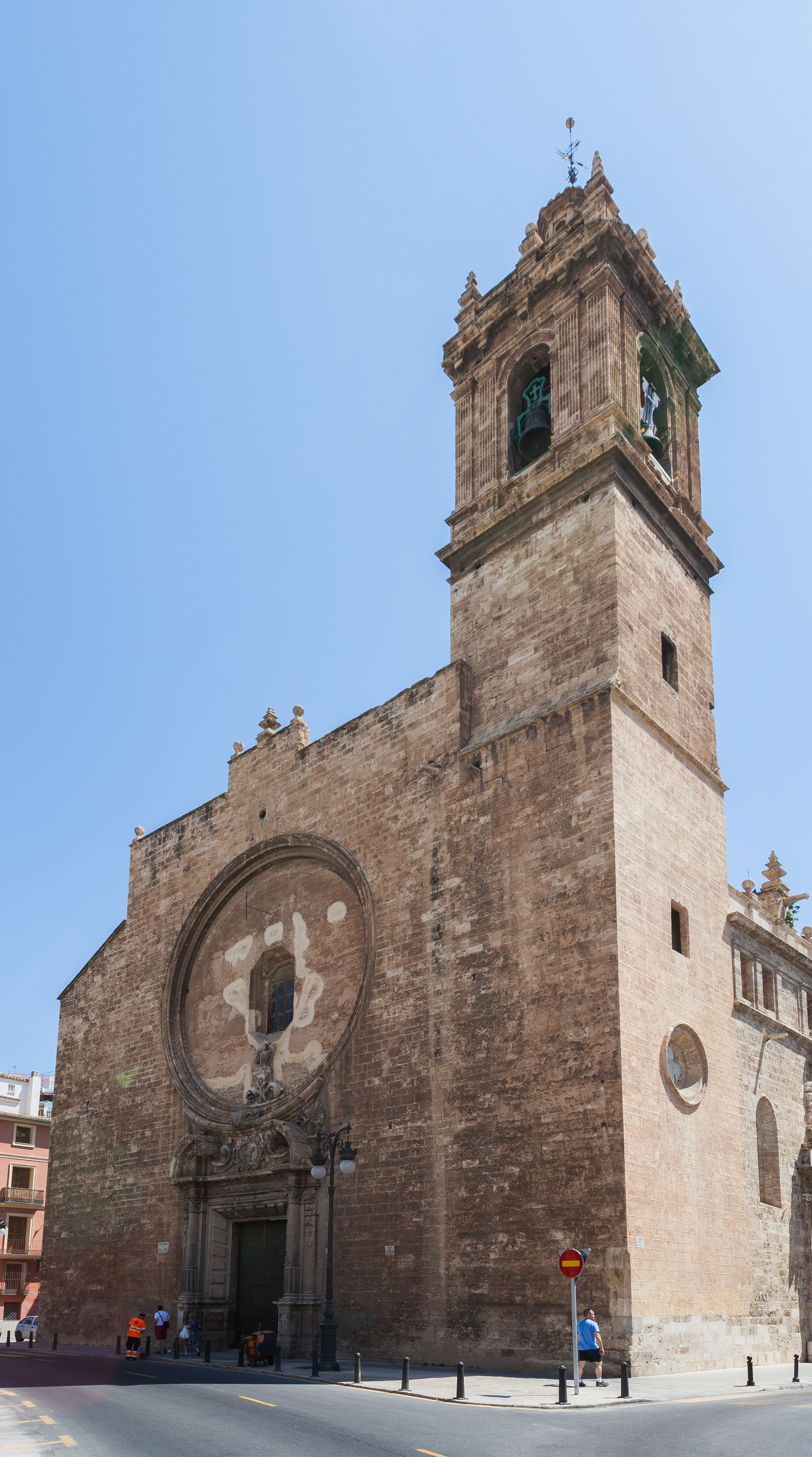
View from the corner of Carniceros Street

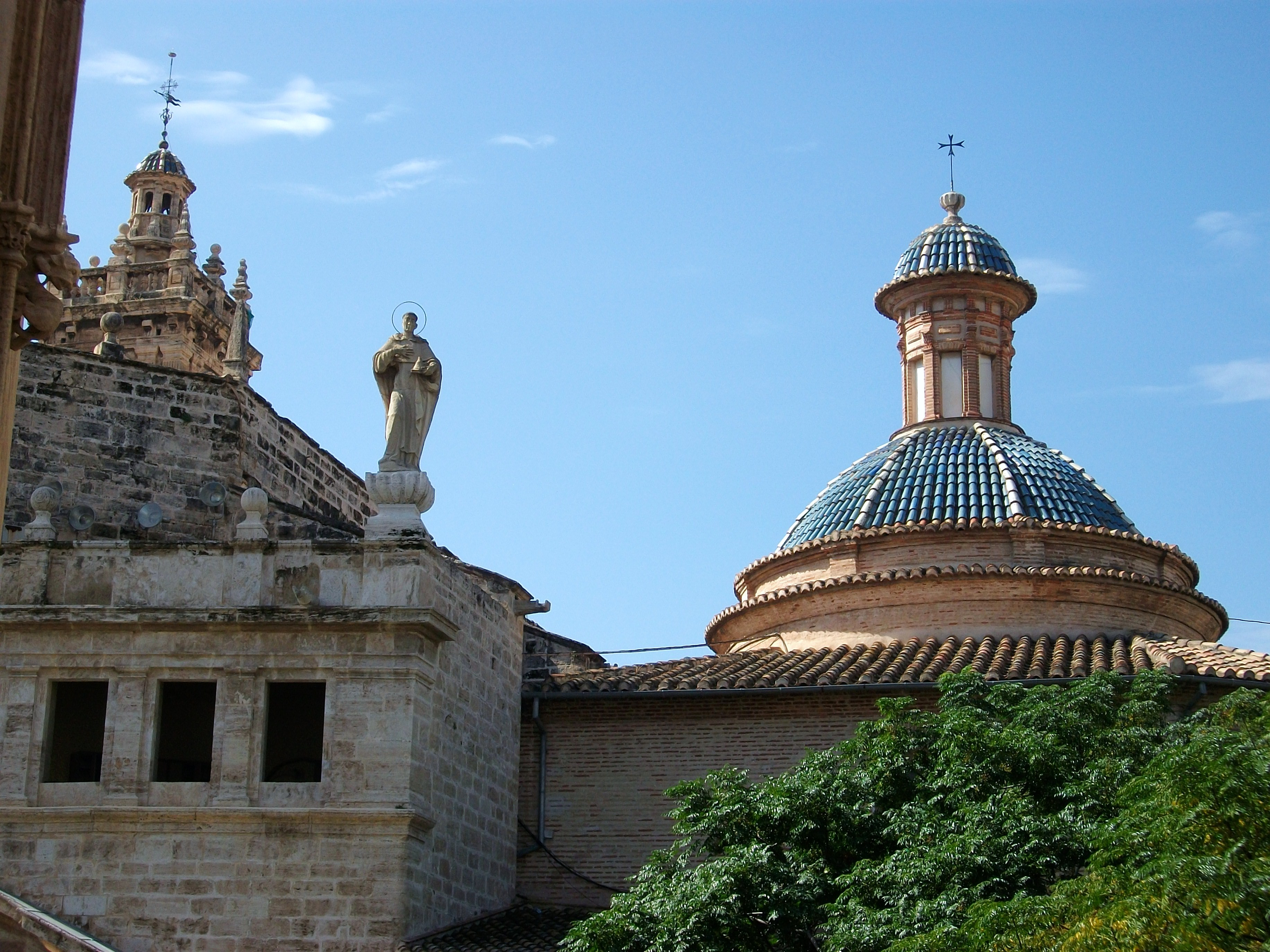
Dome of the Communion Chapel

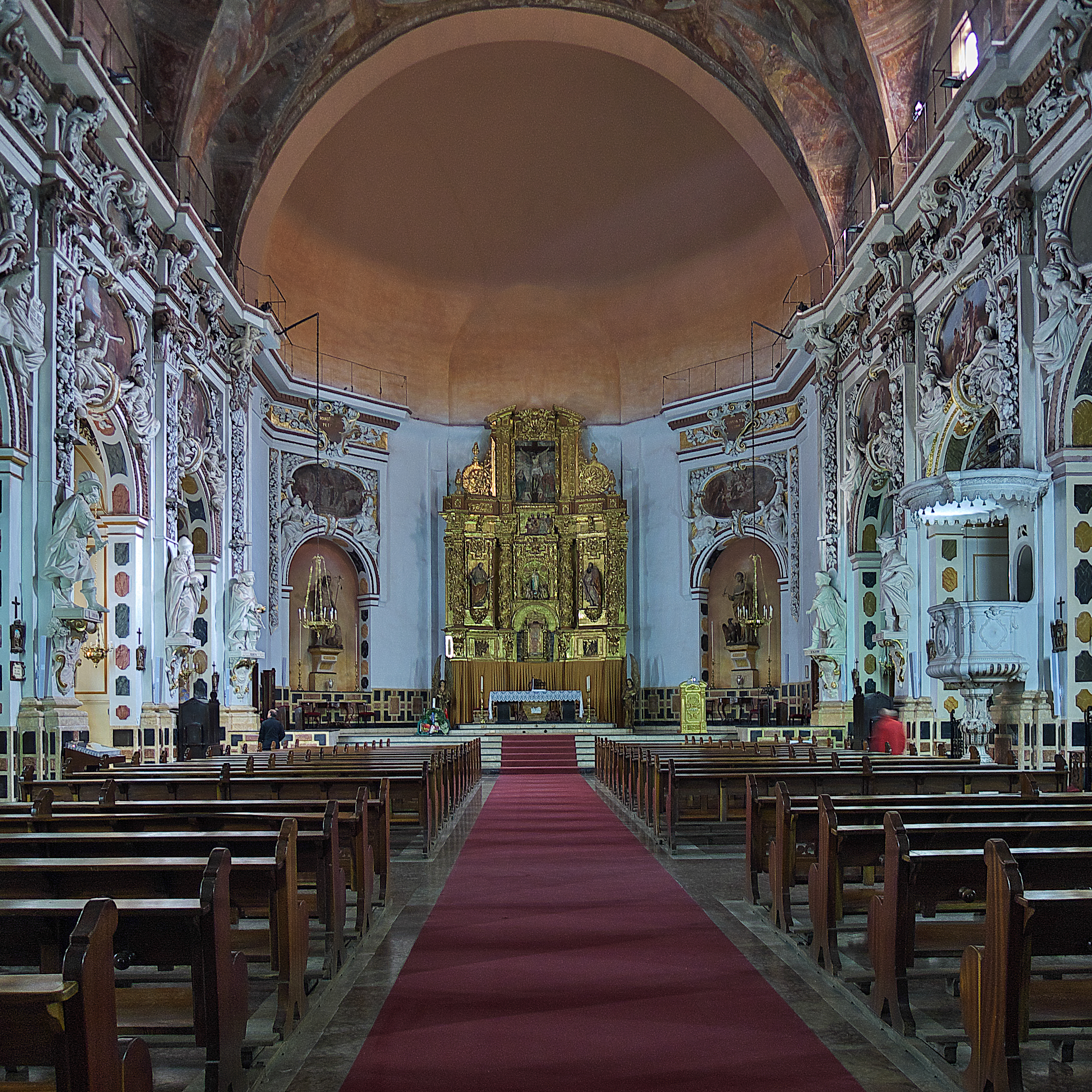
Interior
