= Orange Museum =

Museum dedicated to oranges, located in Burriana (Castellón), Spain

Coordinates: 39°53′24.8″N 0°4′59.3″W

- Orange Museum
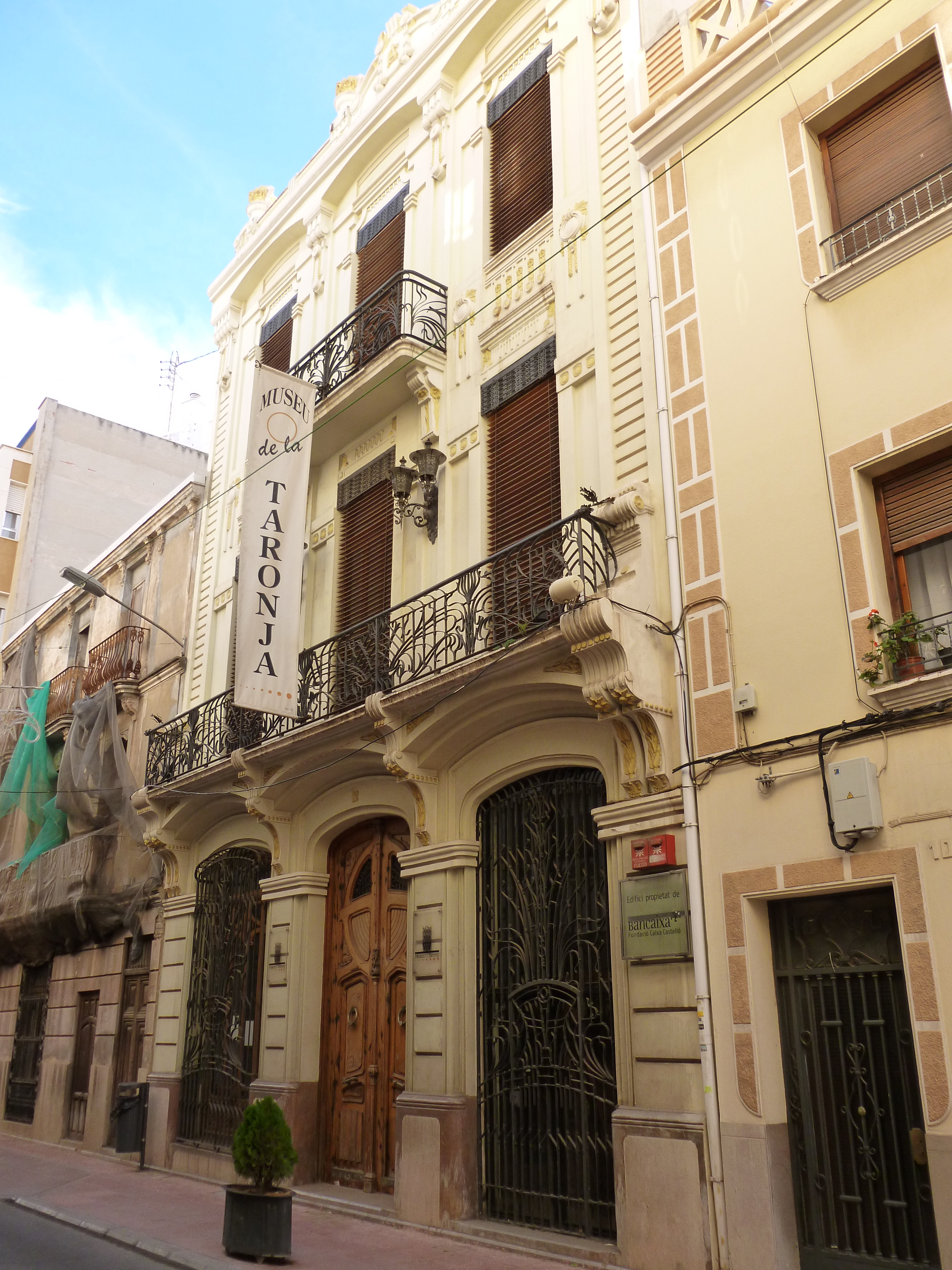
- Established: 1995
- Location: 10, Major Street - Burriana (Castellón), Spain
- Website: Orange Museum

The Orange Museum (Museu de la Taronja in Valencia) is located in 10 Major Street in Burriana (Castellón), Spain. The building is an example of Valencian Art Nouveau style.
