= Gaudí Centre =

Biographical museum in Spain

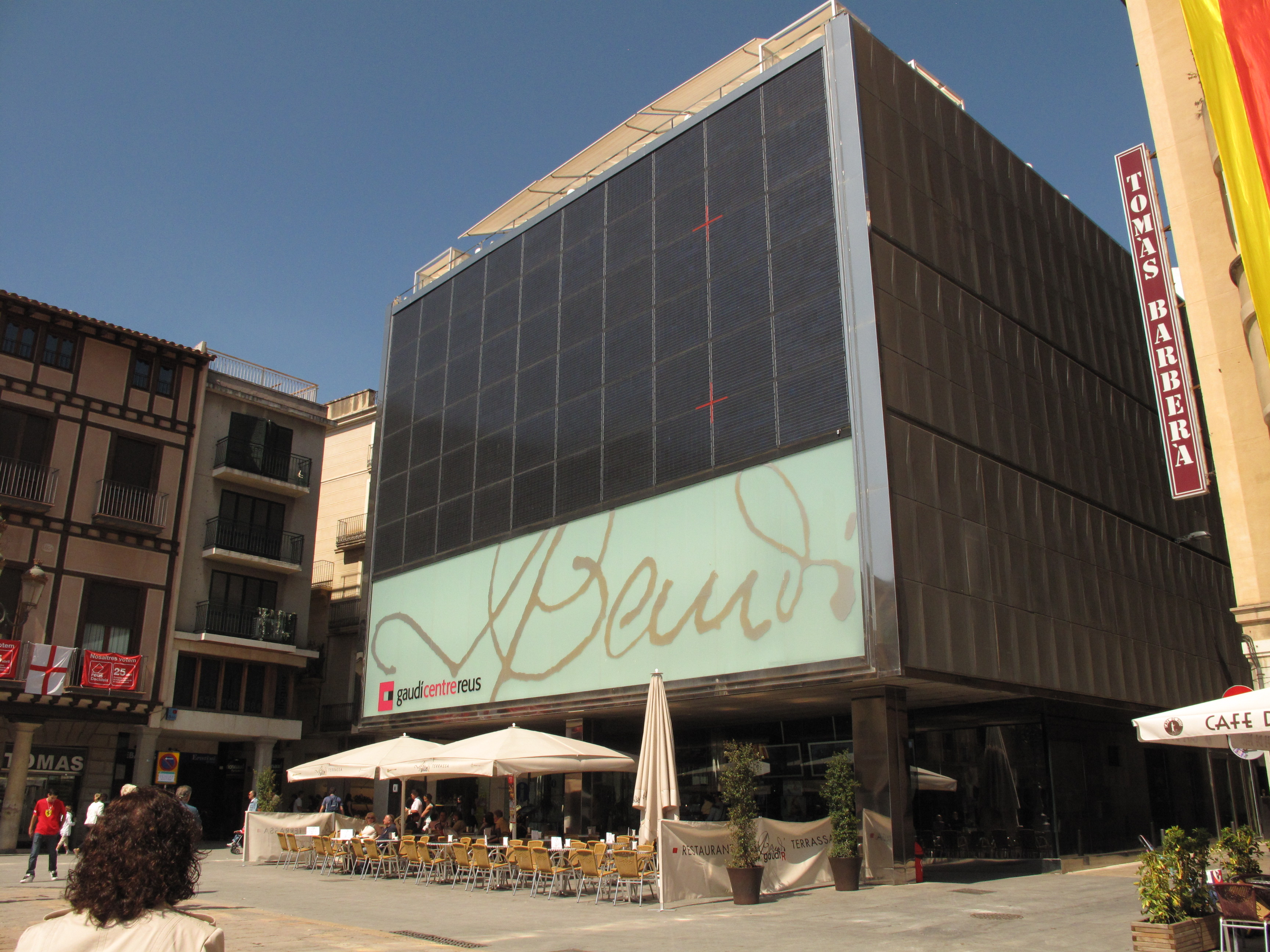
- Gaudí Centre, Reus
- Established: 27 April 2007; 19 years ago
- Location: Plaça del Mercadal, Reus, Catalonia, Spain
- Coordinates: 41°09′19″N 1°06′30″E
- Type: biographical museum and cultural centre
- Director: Josep M. Cabré
- Website: www.gaudicentre.cat

The Gaudí Centre (Catalan: Gaudí Centre; Spanish: Gaudí Centro) is a biographical museum and a interpretation centre located in Reus, Catalonia, Spain. It is dedicated to Catalan architect Antoni Gaudí i Cornet.

== History ==
The building is a renovation of the former Banco Santander, in Reus, who was previously a toy store known as l'Aliança. The work on the project started in 2002, designed by architects Joan Sibina, Toshiake Tange and Gabriel Bosques, coinciding with the 150th anniversary of the birth of Gaudí. The company in charge of creating the museography of the exhibition and the integration of the audiovisual systems was Sono Tecnologia Audiovisual. The building is divided into four floors, and highlights the giant screen it has on its facade, where an audiovisual with Gaudí's signature is often shown. On the ground floor is located the tourist office of the city and a shop. The first three floors house the exhibition space. On its top floor there is a restaurant.

The Gaudí Center officially opened at 27 April 2007 as a modern and interactive museum. It is located in Plaça del Mercadal, the center of the city, which is also on the market square in Reus that links to Reus Town Council, Patronat de Turisme, and the Modernist buildings Casa Navàs and Casa Pinyol.

The locals have known the center as "Gaudí Casket", which is dedicated to Antonio Gaudí, "the city's beloved son". The interpretation center exhibits works related to his life and a few surviving handwritten notebooks, including the original copy with English translations and duplication of his models, major works, and studio.

== Architecture and design ==
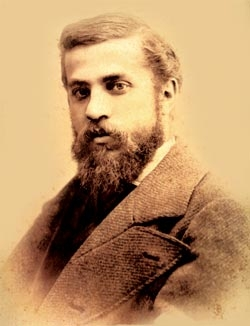
Antoni Gaudí I Cornet (1852-1926)

The museum is a three-storied building, which consists of Gaudí's artworks and documenting processes with advanced audio and visual technology. that has 1,200 m^{2} exhibition space throughout the three floors. It is also known as the entry doors to the city.

A new website that allowed a virtual visit to the museum was created in 2008, and in 2010, new changes were made to the first exhibition model created in 2007, incorporating more multimedia applications. The city council has invested 10,000 euros on small interventions on the facade by changing the fluorescent and indicative vinyl, in 2018. Its LED system saves 70% of electrical consumption.

== Management ==
The center offers a tour guide service to the Modernist Route of Reus, Institut Pere Mata, Casa Navàs, and back to the Gaudí Centre. It also has a temporary exhibition hall, a gift shop, and a restaurant. Its advanced audio and visual technology is the key to the museum. It also provides audio guides in different languages. The center intends to attract children and young adults, allowing visitors to experience through their senses Gaudí's art pieces. The museum contains different objects from Antoni Gaudí, as well as multimedia about his designs throughout the three floors. The first floor, "Gaudí and Reus", displays his drafts and documents and information related to Antonio Gaudí's place of birth. The second floor, "Gaudí - innovator", exhibits Gaudí's inspirations and ideas in art expressed by two-way models and materials. The third floor, "Antonio Gaudí and the Universe", displays an audiovisual show with a film called "Invitation to the world of Gaudí", and models of important works that made him famous and unique.

=== Admission ===
The Gaudí Center charges adults for 9 euros, students for 5 euros, and free of charge for eight years old or under. The opening hours on Sunday are from 11 A.M. to 2 P.M. and from Monday to Saturday is from 10 A.M. to 7 P.M.

== See also ==
- Modernisme
- List of single-artist museums
