= Agustí =

Agustí or Agusti may refer to:

- The given name Agusti, a variant of Augustine (given name)

== People with the surname ==
- Jordi Agustí, Spanish paleontologist
- Sergi Agustí (born 1967), Spanish film director
- Susana Agustí, Spanish biological oceanographer

== See also ==
- Casa Agusti, building in Barcelona
- Sant Agustí
- Includes several people with first name Agusti
