= Tarrat =

Tarrat is a surname. Notable people with the surname include:

- Edward Tarrat (1529–1590), English member of parliament
- Genoveva Forest Tarrat (1928–2007), Spanish activist

== See also ==
- Tarrats
