= Elies Rogent =

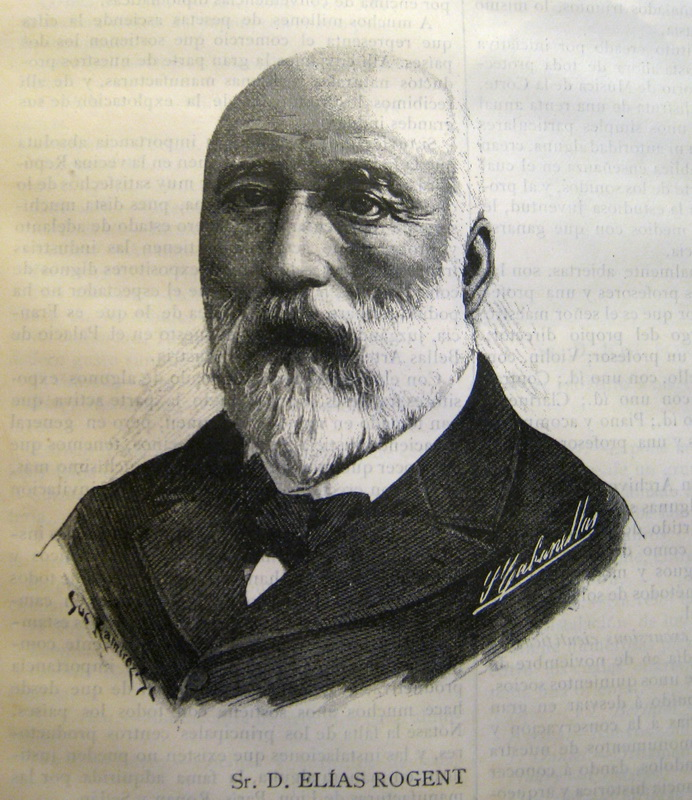
Elies Rogent (1888)

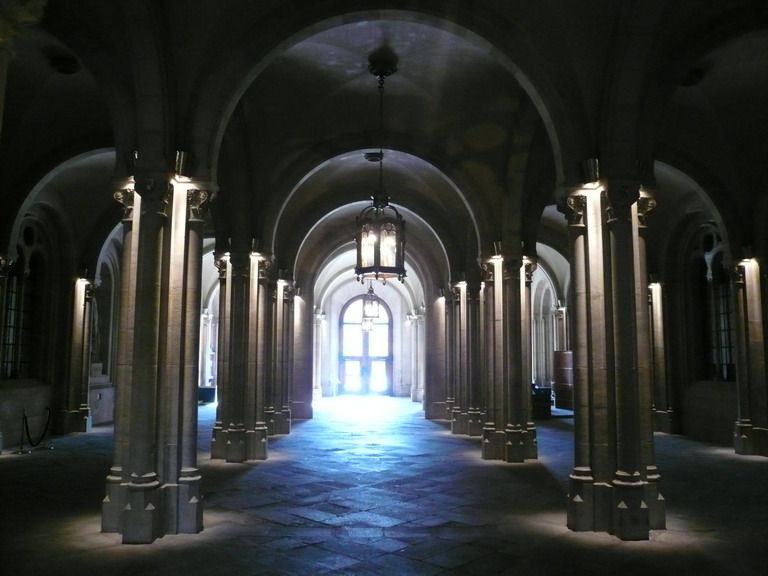
Vestibule of the University of Barcelona, in neo-Romanesque style

Elies Rogent i Amat (Barcelona 18 July 1821 – Barcelona 21 February 1897), was a Catalan architect of Spanish nationality.

== Life and work ==
He studied at the school of Architecture in Madrid, from which he graduated on 20 February 1851. He was appointed as the director of the Barcelona Provincial School of Architecture in 1871.

An admirer of Eugène Viollet-le-Duc, he passed on his passion for mediaeval architecture through his teaching work. His students included Lluís Domènech i Montaner and Antoni Gaudí, of whom he reputedly said, as he signed his degree, "I have approved either a madman or a genius".

In 1887, the mayor of Barcelona, Francesc Rius i Taulet, put him in charge of the works for the Barcelona Universal Exposition of 1888. In order to bring this project to a successful conclusion he made many changes to the original plans by Josep Fontserè i Mestre, and managed to complete the task in record time thanks to the assistance of his disciple Lluís Domènech i Montaner.

He was a member of the Reial Acadèmia Catalana de Belles Arts de Sant Jordi

His major works include:

- Mataró prison (1863), the first prison building planned on the "panoptical" principle (that is, with every part of the building visible from a central point), devised by the English philosopher Jeremy Bentham in the 18th century.
- The Vallvidrera dam (1865)
- Casa Arnús (1868), in Passeig de Gràcia (Barcelona)—not to be confused with another building of the same name by Enric Sagnier.
- Casa Almirall (1870) in Carrer Pelai (Barcelona)
- The old building of the University of Barcelona (1873), with strong mediaeval influence.
- The Conciliar Seminary in Barcelona (1879)
- Barcelona Wax Museum (1882)
- He was also responsible for the restoration of the cloisters of the monasteries of Sant Cugat del Vallès (1852) and Montserrat (1854), as well as the reconstruction of the monastery of Santa Maria de Ripoll (1886).
