= Lluís Domènech i Montaner =

Catalan architect (1849–1923)

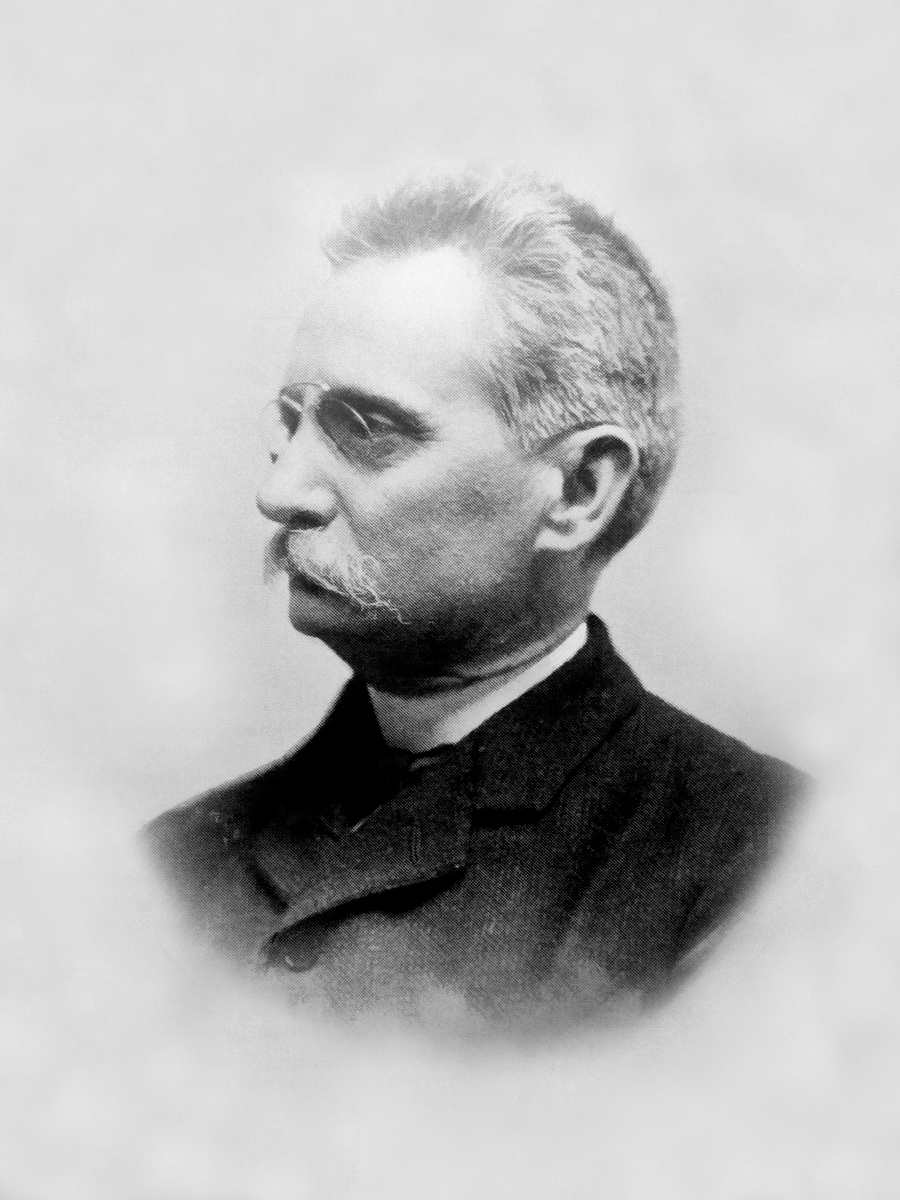
- Domènech i Montaner in 1915
- Born: 21 December 1849; Barcelona, Catalonia, Spain
- Died: 27 December 1923; Barcelona
- Resting place: Sant Gervasi Cemetery Barcelona
- Monuments: The Hospital de Sant Pau and Palau de la Música Catalana, declared World Heritage by UNESCO
- Occupations: architect and politician

Lluís Domènech i Montaner (Catalan pronunciation: [ʎuˈiz ðuˈmɛnək i muntəˈne]; 21 December 1849 – 27 December 1923) was a Catalan architect who was very much involved in and influential for the Catalan Modernisme català, the Art Nouveau/Jugendstil movement. He was also a Catalan politician.

Born in Barcelona, he initially studied physics and natural sciences, but soon switched to architecture. He was registered as an architect in Barcelona in 1873. He also held a 45-year tenure as a professor and director at the Escola d'Arquitectura, Barcelona's school of architecture, and wrote extensively on architecture in essays, technical books and articles in newspapers and journals.

His most famous buildings, the Hospital de Sant Pau and Palau de la Música Catalana in Barcelona, have been collectively designated as a UNESCO World Heritage Site.

As an architect, 45-year professor of architecture and prolific writer on architecture, Domènech i Montaner played an important role in defining the Modernisme arquitectonic in Catalonia. This style has become internationally renowned, mainly due to the work of Antoni Gaudí. Domènech i Montaner's article "En busca d'una arquitectura nacional" (In search of a national architecture), published 1878 in the journal La Renaixença, reflected the way architects at that time sought to build structures that reflected the Catalan character.

His buildings displayed a mixture between rationalism and fabulous ornamentation inspired by Spanish-Arabic architecture, and followed the curvilinear design typical of Art Nouveau. In the El castell dels 3 dragons restaurant in Barcelona (built for the World's Fair in 1888), which was for many years the Zoological Museum, he applied very advanced solutions (a visible iron structure and ceramics). He later developed this style further in other buildings, such as the Palau de la Música Catalana in Barcelona (1908), where he made extensive use of mosaic, ceramics and stained glass, the Hospital de Sant Pau in Barcelona, and the Institut Pere Mata in Reus.

Domènech i Montaner's work evolved towards more open structures and lighter materials, evident in the Palau de la Música Catalana. Other architects, like Gaudí, tended to move in the opposite direction.

Domènech i Montaner also played a prominent role in the Catalan autonomist movement. He was a member of the La Jove Catalunya and El Centre Català and later chaired the Lliga de Catalunya (1888) (Catalan League) and the Unió Catalanista (1892) (Catalan Union). He was one of the organisers of the commission that approved the Bases de Manresa, a list of demands for Catalan autonomy. He was a member of the Centre Nacional Català (1889) and Lliga Regionalista (1901), and was one of the four parliamentarians who won the so-called "candidature of the four presidents" in 1901. Though re-elected in 1903, he abandoned politics in 1904 to devote himself fully to archeological and architectural research.

He died in Barcelona in 1923 and was buried in the Sant Gervasi Cemetery in that city.

== Education and teaching career ==
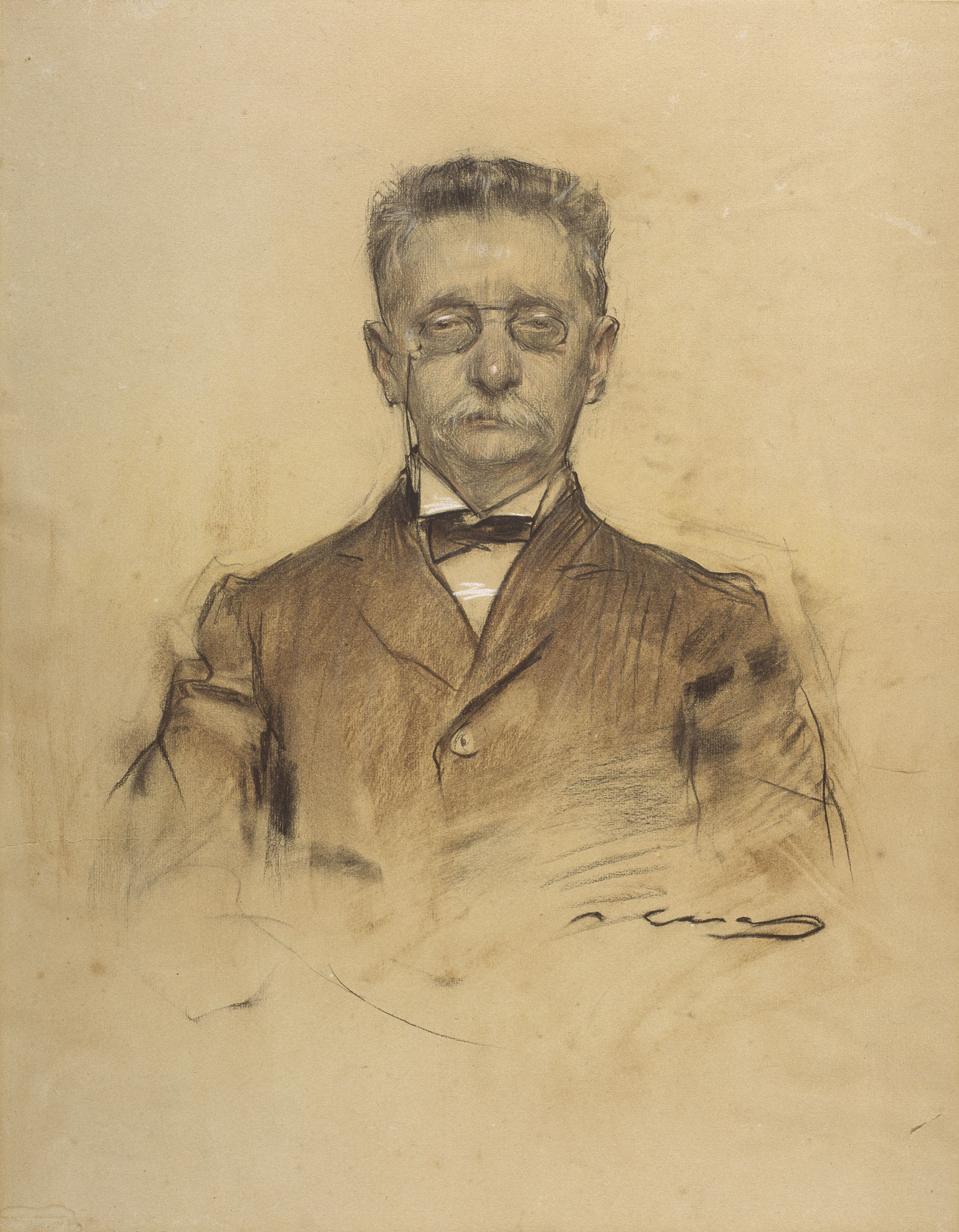
Domènech i Montaner seen by Ramon Casas (MNAC)

Born in Carrer Avinyó in Barcelona, he was the second son of Pere Domènech i Saló, a prestigious publisher and book-binder, and Maria Montaner i Vila, a member of a prosperous family from Canet de Mar, where Domènech i Montaner spent much time in his home/office, now converted into a museum. After having studied physics and mathematics, he studied as an architect in Barcelona and at the school of architecture of the Real Academia de Bellas Artes de San Fernando in Madrid, from where he graduated on 13 December 1873.

Having completed his studies, he travelled through France, Switzerland, Italy, Germany and Austria to gain experience of trends in architecture.

In 1875, as soon as the Barcelona school of architecture opened, he joined it, along with his friend Josep Vilaseca, as a teacher of topography and mineralogy. In 1877 he became professor of "Knowledge of materials and the application of physiochemical science to architecture". In 1899 he was appointed professor of "Architectural Composition" and project teacher. In 1900 he became director of the school of architecture, and between 1901 and 1905 he was substituted by Joan Torras i Guardiola, Domènech at this time being in Madrid as a deputy in the Congress. He returned to the post from 1905 to 1920. His teaching career lasted 45 years, and he exercised a considerable influence on what was to become Modernisme in Catalonia. With his colleague Antoni Maria Gallissà he subsequently set up a workshop for advanced work on the decorative arts applied to architecture.

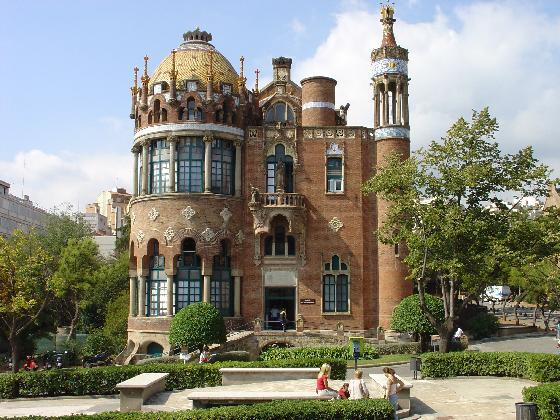
Hospital de Sant Pau, pavilion

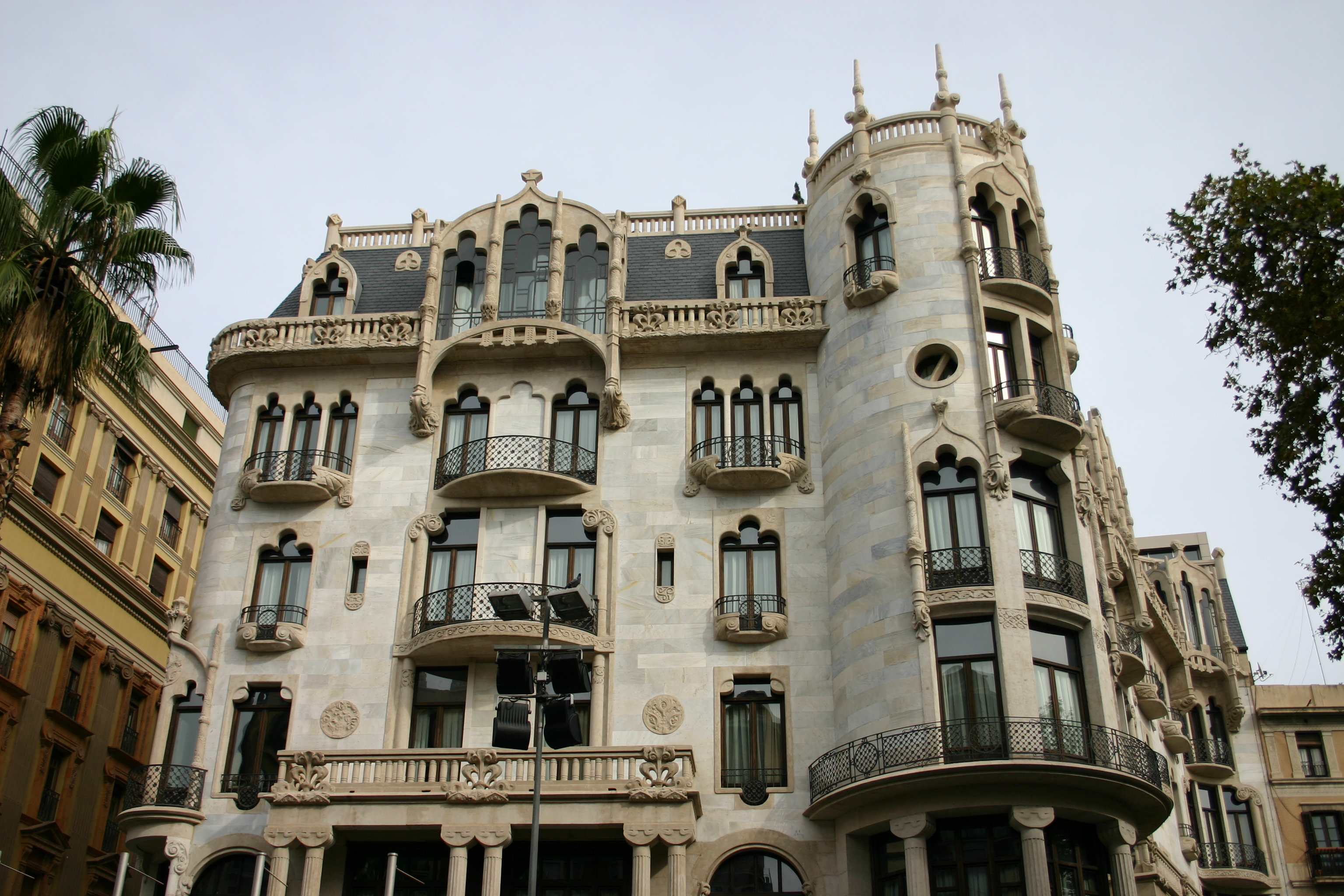
Casa Fuster

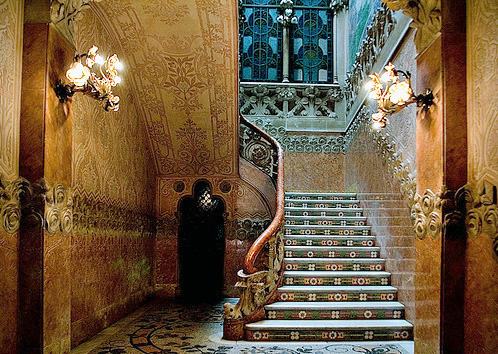
Casa Navàs in Reus

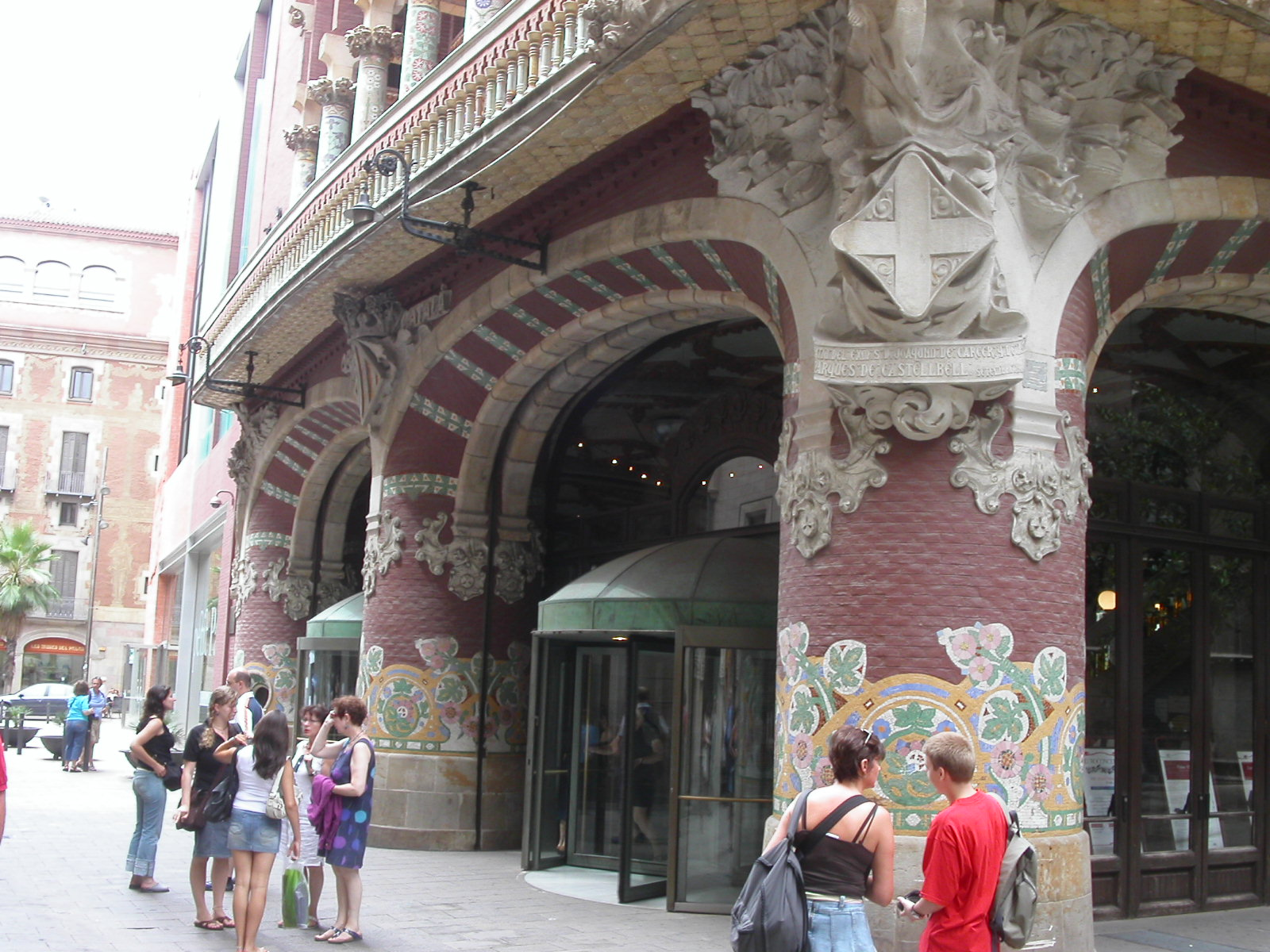
Palau de la Música Catalana

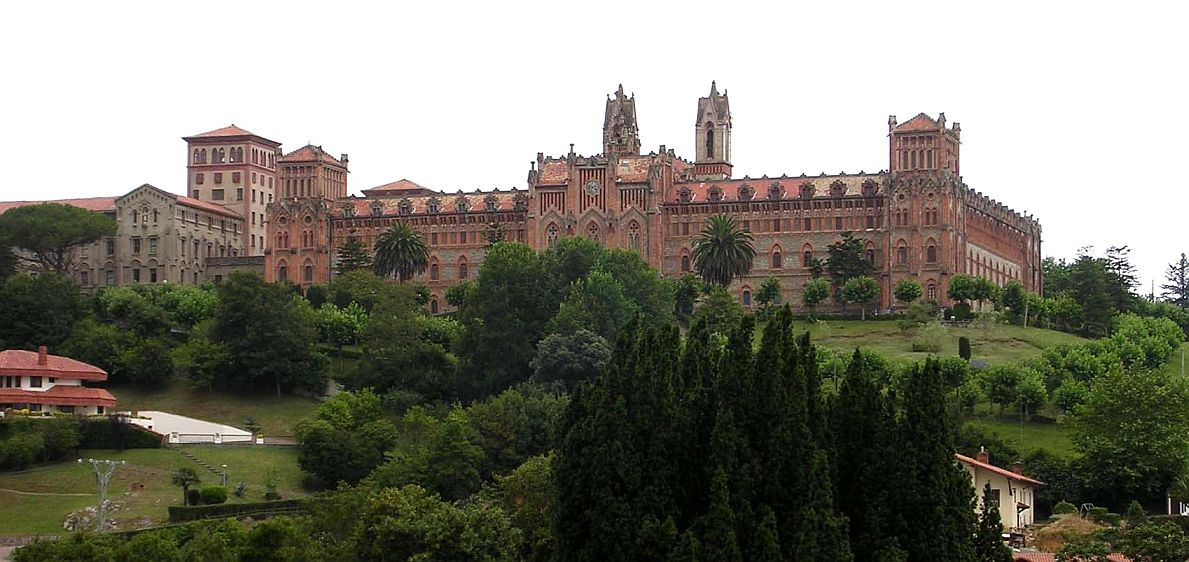
Comillas Pontifical University

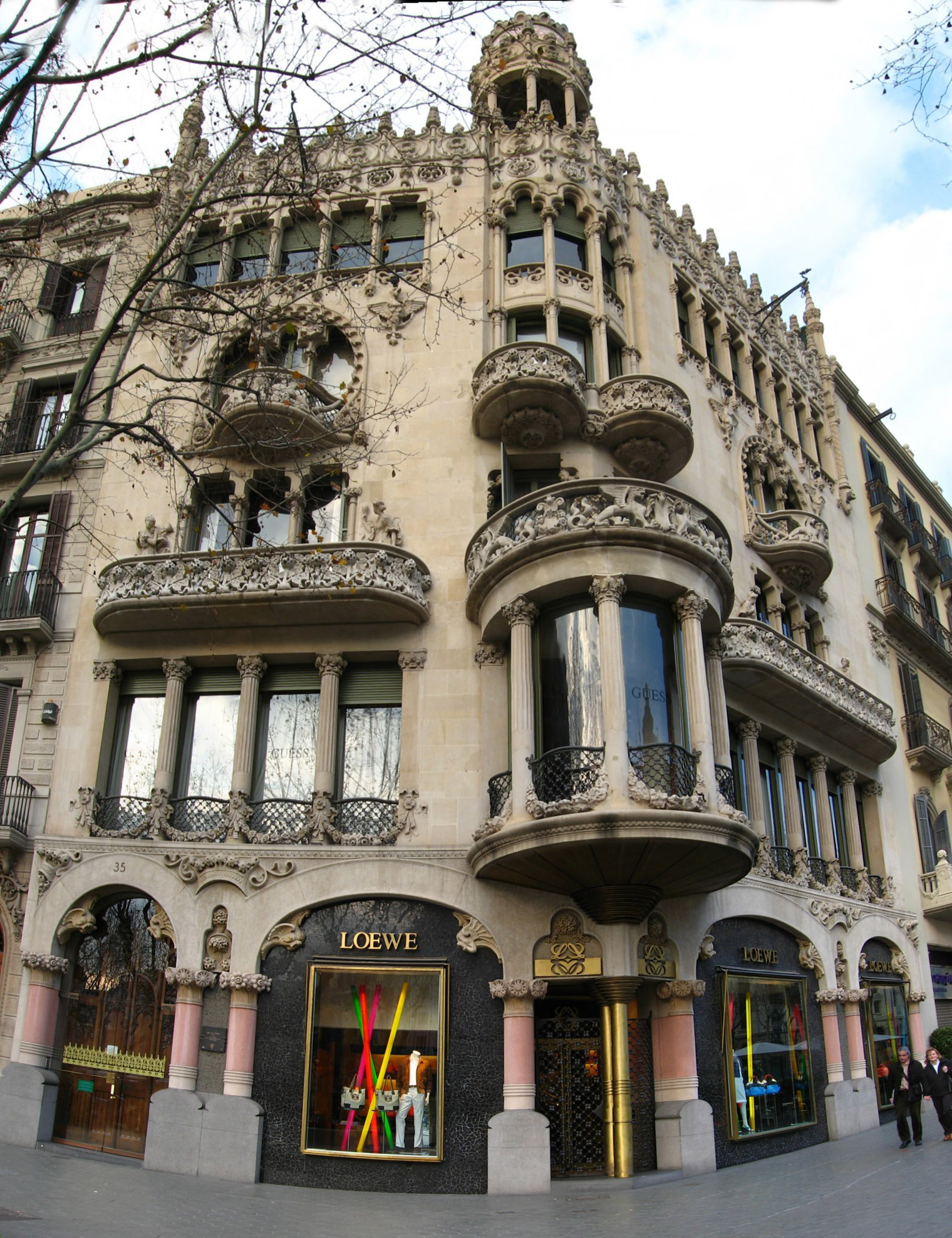
Casa Lleó Morera

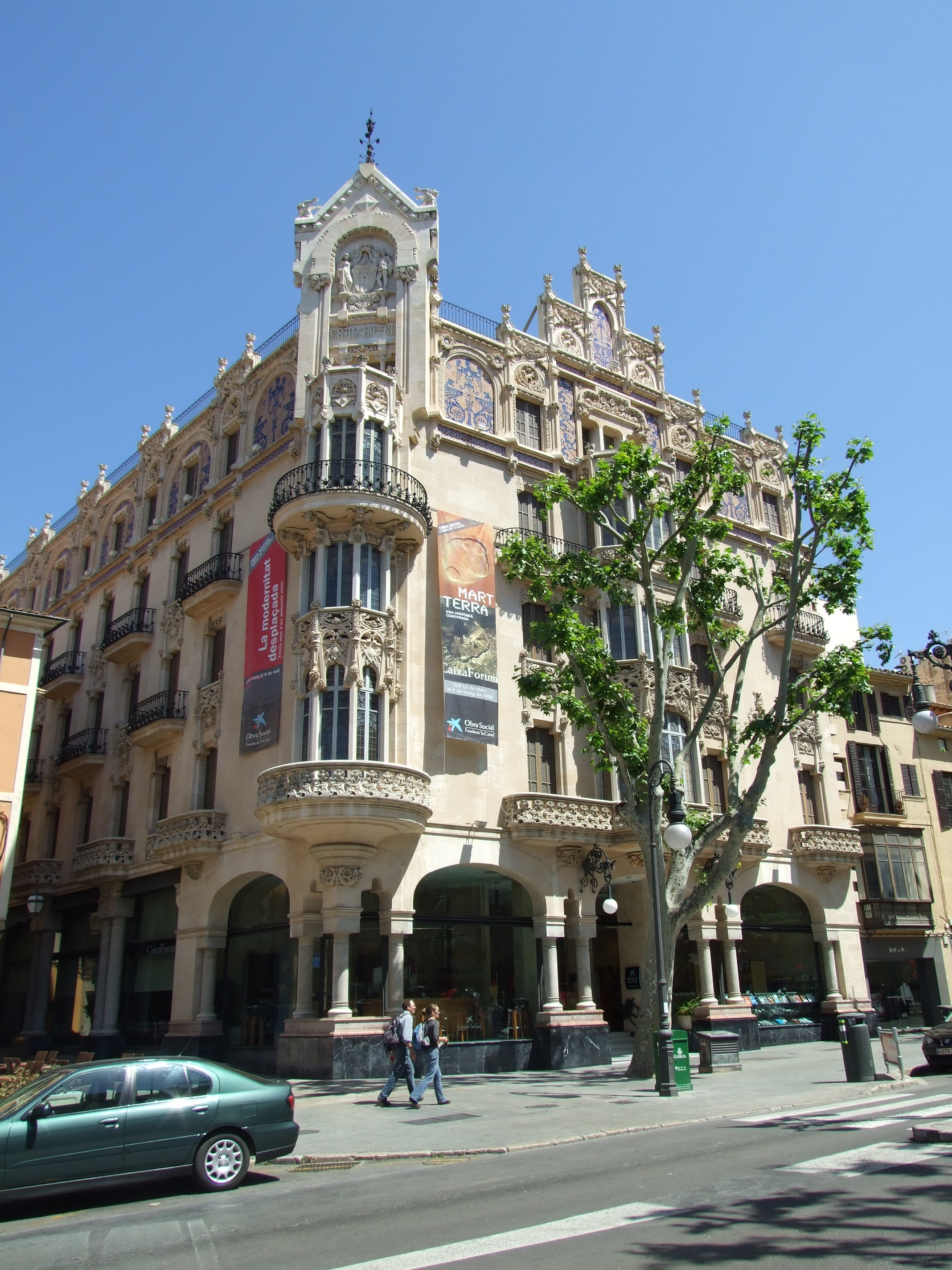
The Gran Hotel in Palma de Mallorca

== Architectural works ==
Domènech i Montaner's buildings combine structural rationality with extraordinary ornamentation inspired by Hispano-Arabic architectural tradition and by the curves typical of Modernisme. They were in the architectural vanguard at the time, with the use of structural steel and the total utilization of exposed brickwork, and incorporated a profusion of mosaics, ceramics and stained glass, arranged in exquisite harmony.

As director of the School of Architecture he promoted a style that was adopted by many of his pupils. Puig i Cadafalch regarded him as "a man of a certain period and of a certain artistic school, who was a sounding-board for developments in other countries, adapting them to his own character in an innovative way".

As the years went by, unlike many Modernista architects, Domènech i Montaner's buildings tended to become lighter, reducing the amount of structural material but retaining ornamentation as a primary element.

=== Pre-Modernista period ===
No sooner had Domènech graduated than he set out on a tour of Europe in the company of Josep Vilaseca, and was attracted by Prussian architecture. This, as well as Vilaseca's personality, had an influence on his subsequent work.

This influence can be seen in a number of Domènech's works from before 1878 (the year when he published his manifesto En busca d'una arquitectura nacional): the Clavé family tomb and the Casa Montaner on the Ronda de la Universitat, as well as a project for the provincial education institutions that was never built. These works can be regarded as pre-Modernista.

The building for the Editorial Montaner i Simón (1879–1885) was in fact his first work after the manifesto and it employs Mudejar decorative solutions while not abandoning Germanic influence and symbolism. Domènech went beyond European manifestations, employing a forthright new language to implement an architectural approach founded on a new, integrated concept of all the arts. It was commissioned by his uncle Ramon Montaner i Vila, who also had him build his town house in Barcelona, the Palau Ramon Montaner, and remodel the Castell de Santa Florentina, his residence in Canet de Mar.

=== Modernisme ===
Domènech received a number commissions associated with the Exposición Universal de Barcelona (1888), thanks to his close friendship with Elies Rogent, director of the School of Architecture and of the works for the Exposition. He was a member of the Mining Committee and the architect in charge of the improvement works on the Parc de la Ciutadella. He also refurbished the Barcelona City Hall to accommodate the royal family during the event. The best-known of these works are undoubtedly the construction of the Hotel Internacional, which no longer exists, but which was put up in a record time of 53 days, and the cafe-restaurant known as the Castell dels Tres Dragons (now the Museu de Zoologia de Barcelona), the building that best expresses these new trends and is considered to mark the beginning of the Modernista period. The use of exposed chamfered brickwork and the use of exposed structural ironwork gives the building an industrial look, solid and compact on the lower levels but agile and transparent above, with its pierced parapets crowned by a pinnacle. The interior is an open space with two arches that support a stepped, symmetrical roof. Domènech incorporated the best of the applied arts and ornamental solutions that became permanent, such as the florid crowns of the capitals. Ceramics from the Pujol i Bausis factory were used, with designs by Antoni M. Gallissà, Josep Llimona, J.A. Pellicer and Alexandre de Riquer. There were also stained glass windows by Antoni Rigalt i Blanch, but these have now perished. The use of these techniques on the Montaner i Simón building inspired Hendrik Petrus Berlage when he designed the Amsterdam bourse.

Subsequently, he designed private residences such as the Casa Navàs i Rull in Reus; the Casa Lleó Morera, the Casa Thomas in Barcelona and the Casa Solà Morales in Olot. In all of these he adopted an integral approach to modernisme, with an intensive use of the applied arts, particularly sculpture, mosaic and stained glass.

=== The major works ===
At the height of his professional career, Domènech i Montaner took on his largest and most complex works, the ones for which he is most widely recognized. His work on these projects overlapped in time, and he was able to take advantage of the experience gained on each one. Much of the knowledge gained and many of the technical innovations employed on the Expo restaurant (the Castell dels Tres Dragons, now the geology museum) were later used in the design and construction of the Palau de la Música, and the avant-garde concepts applied in the Institut Pere Mata were later adopted and improved on at the Hospital de Sant Pau.

The Palau de la Música Catalana and the Hospital de Sant Pau both won awards in the annual architectural competition organized by the Barcelona City Council, in 1905 and 1913 respectively. More recently UNESCO has declared them to be World Heritage.

==== Institut Pere Mata ====
Before the 19th century came to an end, at the height of modernisme, Domènech built the Institut Pere Mata, an institution for the mentally ill in Reus (1897–1919). It is an example of architecture at the service of people, without neglecting the purely aesthetic aspect. It was begun with the support of Pau Font de Rubinat, and marked an advance in the provision of medical services, at a time when there was growing support for a social approach to health. It consists of isolated pavilions organized along internal "streets", catering for all treatment needs. Domènech deploys an ornamental language in which nature helps lighten the spirit as it penetrates into all the rooms by way of the stained glass, ceramics and mosaics. A year later, he was to use the knowledge gained at the Institut for the medically innovative design of the Hospital de Sant Pau.

==== Palau de la Música Catalana ====
Domènech used very advanced structural solutions in this work, including laminated sections, a steel frame stabilized by a system of buttresses and perimetral vaults of Gothic inspiration and large walls of glass.

This building is a paradigm of Domènech's work: the control of the interior space and the light by means of the double facade, the stylistic unity of all the applied arts—sculpture, mosaic, stained glass and wrought ironwork. Domènech i Montaner worked with the usual artists on this work: the mosaicist Lluís Brú and the ceramicists Josep Orriols and Modest Sunyol, with stained glass by Rigalt i Granell and cement tiles by Escofet and sculptures by Miquel Blay, Eusebi Arnau, Didac Massana and Pau Gargallo.

==== Hospital de Sant Pau ====
The hospital project was informed by the growing concern at the time about health in the big cities. Domènech studied various solutions that had been used around Europe (Lariboisière Hospital in Paris, St. Thomas's in London, Brugmann in Laeken, Belgium and the military hospital in Toul, France), and devised a totally innovative solution based on isolated pavilions linked by underground passages. With the combination of the Catalan vault and steel structures like those employed at the Tres Dragons and the Palau, large, clear spaces were made possible. The sobriety of the brickwork so typical of Domènech's work is tempered by the warmth of the Montjuïc stone, as is also the case in the Palau de la Música, with sculptures by Pau Gargallo and Francesc Madurell i Torres.

== Writings ==
Domènech contributed to the leading Catalan publications: La Renaixença, Lo Catalanista, Revista de Catalunya, El Diluvio and La Veu de Catalunya. In 1904, after falling out with Francesc Cambó, he ceased to contribute to La Veu de Catalunya and founded the weekly El Poble Català. He was also the author of many books, some technical works (Historia general del arte: arquitectura, 1886; Iluminación solar de los edificios, 1877) and some political and social essays ("La política tradicional d'Espanya", 1898; "Estudis polítics", 1905, "Conservació de la personalitat de Catalunya", 1912, "La Política tradicional d'Espanya: com pot salvar-se'n Catalunya", 1919).

In an article entitled “En busca de una arquitectura nacional” (In search of a national architecture), published on 28 February 1878 in La Renaixença, he set forth the guiding principles for a modern, national architecture for Catalonia.

He was also active as a publisher. He was editor of the Biblioteca Artes y Letras, published by Editorial Domènech, the family firm, for which he also designed many book-covers, and which included the works of the country's best writers and translations of the most important European authors of the time. Between 1886 and 1897, the Editorial Montaner i Simón published under his direction the monumental Historia General del Arte. Domènech also illustrated the first part, and it was continued by Josep Puig i Cadafalch.

In company with his friends Antoni M. Gallissà and Josep Font i Gumà and with members of the Centre Excursionista de Catalunya, he visited Romanesque churches in several parts of Catalonia; in 1904, those of Pallars, Ribagorça and Cerdanya; in 1905, those of Ripollès, Gironès, Vallespir, Rosselló and Vall d'Aran; and finally, in 1906 he visited the churches of Empordà, whose style he dubbed First Romanesque. In this way Domènech collected material for his work on Romanesque architecture, and he provided the School of Architecture with an important photographic archive.

== Political activity ==
Domènech became involved in politics at an early age, and in 1870 he helped to set up the Jove Catalunya foundation and the Centre Català, from which he separated in 1887. He joined the Lliga de Catalunya, of which he became president in 1888, and in 1891 he founded the Unió Catalanista, of which he was the first president in 1892, with Enric Prat de la Riba as secretary. That same year he chaired the assembly that drew up the Bases de Manresa, a document that laid the foundations for the return of the historic rights acknowledged by the Catalan constitutions.

He pursued a policy of collaboration with Polavieja, who defended regionalist demands. He was also one of the signatories of the Manifest a la reina regent of 1898. The following year he joined the Centre Nacional Català which, on 25 April 1901, merged with the Unió Regionalista, constituting the Lliga Regionalista. The Lliga was made up of sectors of the middle class who were disappointed with the policies of Polavieja and mobilized by the Tancament de Caixes; it stood for a Catalonia that would be free, strong and autonomous.

Domènech's commitment to the defence of national identity was confirmed when he stood for the legislative elections of 19 May 1901, with the candidature known as the "quatre presidents" (four presidents). He was reelected in 1903, but he could not agree with the behaviour of Cambó during the visit by king Alfonso XIII to Barcelona in 1904. It is thought that he was the author of an anonymous article which appeared on 14 April 1904 in the journal Joventut. The author of the article accused the Barcelona city councillors of weakness in defending Catalan demands before the king. He left the Lliga Regionalista and founded the weekly El Poble Català, around which he organized Esquerra Catalana. Being socially conservative, however, he gradually distanced himself from it and devoted himself to archaeological and historical research, producing Centcelles. Baptisteri i celler: memòria de la primitiva església metropolitana de Tarragona (1921), Història i arquitectura del monestir de Poblet (1925), La iniquitat de Casp i la fi del Comtat d'Urgell (1930) and Ensenyes nacionals de Catalunya (1936). The last three of these were published posthumously with the assistance of his son Fèlix Domènech i Roura.

His political activities and his research led him to be elected three times as president of the Ateneu Barcelonès (1898, 1911 and 1913). In 1881 he was the "mantenidor" of the Jocs Florals, and in 1895 he presided them. He became a member of what is now known as the Reial Acadèmia Catalana de Belles Arts de Sant Jordi (1901) and entered the Acadèmia de Bones Lletres in 1921.

== Works ==
=== Badalona ===
Year	Name	Location	Description	Condition	Image
1893	Casa Agustí	Plaça de Pep Ventura, 33–35	Minor works done with engineer Eduard Agustí i Saladrigas, has had various commercial uses.	Fair	

=== Barcelona ===
Year	Name	Location	Description	Condition	Image
1874	Pantheon of Josep Anselm Clavé (collaboration)	Cemetery of Poble Nou, pantheon 65	Designed by Josep Vilaseca and commissioned by public subscription, Domènech designed the railing surrounding the monument.	Fair	
1885	Editorial Montaner i Simón	carrer d'Aragó	His first work commissioned in the Modernista period, by his uncle Ramon de Montaner i Vila. The facade combines the use of brick with iron in an evidently Germanic manner.	Fair	
1888	Hotel Internacional (Within the 1888 Universal Exposition of Barcelona)	Passeig de Colom (now Moll de la Fusta)	Built on land reclaimed from the sea in the new Passeig de Colom, opposite the Capitania General building. The hotel was built in a record time of 53 days. It had five storeys, each 150×35 m and occupied a plot of 5,000 square meters. With capacity for 2,000 guests in 600 rooms and 30 apartments for large families, it was conceived as a temporary facility for visitors.	Demolished once the Exposition was over.	
1888	Castell dels Tres Dragons (Within the 1888 Barcelona Universal Exhibition)	Parc de la Ciutadella	This building represents a landmark in architecture because it combines for the first time exposed brickwork and iron with ceramic decoration. It was later renovated by Domènech himself as the Museum of History. From 1920 until 2010, it housed the Museum of Zoology.	Fair	
1891–1896	Palau Ramon Montaner	Carrer de Mallorca, 278	Designed by Josep Domènech i Estapà on a commission from the industrialist Ramon Montaner (of editorial Montaner i Simon). A disagreement led to the termination of the contract and Domènech i Montaner, nephew of the owner, was hired to finish the work. The square floor-plan, the symmetry and the surrounding garden lend it a Renaissance air. The facade is decorated, on the upper floor, with ceramics showing allegories of printing, books and art. A notable feature of the interior is the grand staircase lit by a skylight containing stained glass in floral motifs.	Fair	
1898	Casa Thomas	Carrer de Mallorca, 293	Commissioned by the industrialist Joseph Thomas, the building features a facade of neo-Gothic tendency. Originally the building consisted of ground floor containing a lithography workshop and first floor, containing the owner's residence. In 1912 the building was enlarged by Francesc Guàrdia i Vial with the addition of three more floors.	Fair	
1902	Casa Lleó Morera	Passeig de Gràcia, 35	Remodelling of the former casa Rocamora of 1864. It contains rich ornamentation by Lluís Brú i Salelles in mosaics, Antoni Serra i Fiter in ceramics, Antoni Rigalt i Blanch in stained glass, with furniture and joinery by Gaspar Homar i Mezquida and Josep Pey i Farriol, as well as sculptures by Eusebi Arnau i Mascort.	Fair	
1902	Fonda Espanya	Carrer de Sant Pau, 9	Remodelling of the ground floor of a mid-19th-century building. A notable feature is the decoration of the dining-room, with its woodwork and tiled dados, and marine motifs in scratchwork above; the bar has undergone subsequent modifications, but the fireplace, made by Eusebi Arnau in alabaster, is still notable.	Fair	
1902	Refurbishment of the Casa de l'Ardiaca	Carrer de Santa Llúcia, 1	When this medieval house was occupied by Barcelona College of Advocates, Domènech was commissioned to decorate it. Mailbox of Casa de l'Ardiaca.	Fair	
1902	Casa Lamadrid	Carrer de Girona, 113	The flat, narrow facade is treated with rich ornamentation typical of Domènech. Notable features are the almost semi-circular first-floor balconies, the metal railings of the other openings and the ornamental ceramic decoration of the wall surfaces. The ornamental bands in a contrasting colour help to compensate for the verticality of the rest of the ensemble, which is topped by terrace parapet and the Gothic-inspired central turret (with the date of construction of the building.	Fair	
1905–1908	Palau de la Música Catalana	Carrer de Sant Francesc de Paula, Carrer de Sant Pere més Alt, 11–13	This concert-hall commissioned by the Orfeó Català Choral Society, is considered the highest expression of Modernisme. It was declared a World Heritage Site by UNESCO in 1997.	Very good	
1905–1930	Hospital de Sant Pau	Carrer de Sant Antoni Maria Claret, 167	On a site equivalent to nine blocks of the Eixample, the project consisted of a series of individual pavilions, surrounded by gardens and linked by basement passages. The works began in 1905 and in 1911 the first group of buildings entered service. These synthesise Domènech's interpretation of Modernisme with a wealth of decorative elements in stone, iron and ceramics. Domènech's son, Pere Domènech i Roura, was responsible, from 1914, for the continuation of the works, with simpler designs and eclectic traits. In 1930 all the services of the old hospital de la Santa Creu in the Raval, were moved here. In 1997 it was declared a World Heritage Site by UNESCO.	Fair	
1911	Casa Fuster	Passeig de Gràcia, 132; Jardinets de Gràcia	This corner building has three exposed facades faced in white marble, while on the main corner there is a cylindrical volume after the manner of a tower, typical of Domènech. The roof is structured as a French-style mansard, something very unusual in Catalan Modernist architecture. When constructed it was regarded as the most expensive building ever to be raised in Barcelona, such are the materials employed. It is now a hotel.	Very good	

=== Canet de Mar ===
Year	Name	Location	Description	Condition	Image
1883	Teatre Principal	Carrer Ample, 6	In 1883 Maria Pujadas commissioned Lluís Domènech i Montane to remodel a ballroom in the town as a theater. To inaugurate ot, on October 20, Domenech his Renaixença friends and the play Judith de Welp, by Àngel Guimerà, received its premier.	Disappeared	
1884–1885	Ateneu de Canet de Mar	Riera Sant Domènec, 1A	The building, on the site of an old house, has served as the headquarters of several of the town's political and cultural associations. Building of conservative lines with wrought iron railings, abundant reddish sgraffito and a rose window containing stained glass. A notable feature is the chamfered corner with its dome and the lightning conductor in the form of a wrought-iron dragon. It currently houses the Canet public library.	Very good	
1881–1912	Remodelling of the Castle of Santa Florentina	Riera del Pinar, s/n	This castle possibly dates from Roman times, when it would have been a centre of agricultural production. In the 11th century it became a fortified farmhouse, and this was enlarged in the 16th century with the addition of defensive works. In the late 19th century,Ramon Montaner i Vila uncle of Domenech, wanted to adapt the building to the tastes of the time. The architect gave a mediaeval touch to the castle with the introduction of parts of the monastery of Tallat. He also builta crypt for the tomb of Florentina Malató, wife of Ramon Montaner, who died in 1900. It has been listed as an asset of national cultural importance since 1949.	Very good	
1892	Casa Roura; Ca la Bianga	Riera de Sant Domènec, 1	Commissioned in 1889 as a residence for Jacint de Capmany and Paquita Roura, cousins of the architect, shortly after the Universal Exposition. The house is notable for being, along with Castell dels Tres Dragons, one of the first buildings to use exposed brickwork and ironwork, finished with ceramics. The materials came from the workshop of craftsmen that Domènech had in the Castell dels Tres Dragons until 1891.	Very good	
1902	Creu de Pedracastell	Way of the Cross	In 1901 Pope Leo XIII called on towns and villages to erect crosses to commemorate the new century. In 1902 a cross designed by Lluís Domènech i Montaner and promoted by Marià Serra was erected. It fell in 1926 in a gale and a copy by Pere Domènech was erected in its place, but this was destroyed during the Civil War. The existing cross dates from 1954.	Disappeared	
1905	Reform to Masia Rocosa	Chamfer rivers Gavarra and Buscarons	The house is originally of the 16th-and 17th and Domènech used of study. Just before them is the Casa Domènech i Montaner, forming in both a combination of traditional and modernist elements.	Very good	
1910	Pantheon Domènech i Montaner	Municipal Cemetery	Commissioned to Domènech by Ricard de Capmany and Júlia Montaner. From 1915 was transferred to Domènech to bury his son there, Ricard Domènech (1892–1915). While Lluís Domènech also said he wanted to be left buried at his death, in 1923 in full dictatorship of Primo de Rivera - the family decided to stand in a niche in the cemetery of Sant Gervasi in Barcelona. Currently in the pantheon of Canet rests there, in addition to his sons Ricard Domènech and Pere Domènech, and his wife Maria Roura. Pantheon of a sobriety virtually rationalist highlighting the sculpture of Josep Llimona although it was damaged during the Spanish Civil War.	Ok	
1912	Pantheon Fountain-Montaner family	Municipal Cemetery	While many authors attribute to his son Pere Domènech i Roura, the documentary fund of Lluís Domènech i Montaner listed the project as a work of Lluís Domènech. It is a building flanked by four statues very schematic representing the four evangelists: John, Mark, Luke and Matthew, work by sculptor Pau Gargallo. This central body is crowned by a dome covered in decorative ceramics with predominance of white and yellow. The mosaics draw plant and floral motifs and the dome is supported by an octagonal base, wiath a columns that leave between then each space for interior lighting.	Ok	
1918	Casa Domènech i Montaner	Chamfer rivers Gavarra and Buscarons	Domènech take an old house to build this building between 1918 and 1920. The outer level is a mixture of styles, as alternate medieval elements with other more moderns. Regarded as the last modernist work of Lluís Domènech i Montaner, is now the House museum Domènech i Montaner.	Very Good	

=== Comillas ===
Year	Name	Location	Description	Condition	Image
1883–1892	Pontifical University of Comillas		Projects funded by Antonio López y López, first Marquis of Comillas, is a work of eclectic style by Joan Martorell, which Domènech i Montaner charge of the decoration with a clear modernisme focus on auditorium, public church, hall, staircase, bronze door, mosaics and caissoned, breaking with the severity of the original building.	Ok	
1889	Tres caños Fountain	Plaza de Joaquín del Piélago	The three water outlets are located around a central column decorated with cartouche texts with gratitude, motifs with Gothic reminiscents, pillars decorated with figures, floral borders and angels. Highlights the coiled dolphin like a main water issue.	Ok	
1890	Monument to Marquis of Comillas	Jardín del Marqués de Comillas	The social and economic rise of the colonial and shipping Antonio López and López had been unstoppable since his return from Cuba and the establishment of its business in Barcelona. In 1878 King Alfonso XII awarded him the title of Marquis of his hometown (Comillas), in recognition of financial support and equipment provided in the fight against the Cuban insurrection. At this time the town of Comillas was personalized in the figure of the Marquis raising a monument to his memory. Was carried out in the meadow of Ángel Pérez, a friend of López, who had given the village and was to host the monument funded by the municipality. Initially commissioned the monument to Cristobal Cascante but ultimately Domènech i Montaner who was executed, respecting part of the original project. The monument stands on an original pedestal as a ship's bow and the column on which stands the statue of the Marquis. There are many maritime issues and highlighted the bronze statues, with the allegory of the Antilles and the Philippines. These pieces were borrowed, along with the statue of the Marquis during the civil war.	Ok	
1893	Cemetery of Comillas		This is a commission of Antonio López y López, first Marquis of Comillas. It was built on the ruins of an ancient church of the 15th century, which took advantage of some structures and arches. The pantheon of the family Piélago is designed by Domènech with sculpture by Josep Llimona, who is also the spectacular sculpture the exterminating angel.	Ok	

=== l'Espluga de Francolí ===
Year	Name	Location	Description	Condition	Image
1913	Cooperative Winery		Designed by Domènech i Montaner, was completed by his son, Pere Domènech i Roura. It has three naves and exterior decoration. The interior has been transformed without losing any of architectural elements: the buttresses, columns and arches of the interior.	Ok	

=== Esplugues de Llobregat ===
Year	Name	Location	Description	Condition	Image
1915–1920	Monastery of Montsió	Carrer de l'Església, 101	Reform of a farmhouse in 1516 as the initial project of Antoni Maria Gallissà. The work entrusted to 1915 to Josep Pujol i Colom, son of Josep Pujol i Baucis, consisted in changing the cover, add new windows and decorative details of brick in the facade and a central body to the rear of the building, which is the most interesting of the complex. Later the house was sold to the Dominican communities claustrades of Santa Maria de Mont-Sió.	Ok	

=== Olot ===
Year	Name	Location	Description	Condition	Image
1913–1916	Casa Solà-Morales	Passeig d'en Blay 38–40	It is the most beautiful example of modernisme in the city, highlights the gallery and its twelve columns decorated and the Valencian tile of the eave. In addition, the facade is decorated with plant motifs. On the ground floor are the two magnificent caryatids that are work by sculptor Eusebi Arnau i Mascort.	Ok	

=== Palma ===
Year	Name	Location	Description	Condition	Image
1903	Grand Hotel	Plaça Weyler, 3	Building of bill similar to the Casa Lleó Morera. Its currently the headquarters of La Caixa	Ok	

=== Reus ===
Year	Name	Location	Description	Condition	Image
1900	Casa Rull	Carrer de Sant Joan 27	On the upper floor, is interesting the ornamental work, with windows of gothic inspiration, the coat of the owner Pere Rull - and battlements which crown the building. Its currently the headquarters of the Municipal Institute of Cultural Action.	Ok	
1901	Casa Navàs	Plaça Mercadal, 5	Designed and decorated as a continuous complex developing a communicative speech tailored to its owner. The work of the artisans is the most complete of the work of Domènech.	Very Good	
1911	Casa Gasull	Carrer de Sant Joan, 29	Noucentistes ideas of simplicity and purity of lines are observed in the simplifications of the pillars, balusters and capitals. This change of language has been identified as a possible involvement of his son in the design of the work.	Ok	
1912	Institut Pere Mata	Ctra. de l'Institut Pere Mata, 1	Psychiatric hospital which is currently still retains the original function. The technical character of the project adapts to an urban distribution of buildings in independent areas. Has an interesting mix of materials: stone, brick, ceramic and mosaic.	Very good	

=== Tarragona ===
Year	Name	Location	Description	Condition	Image
1906	Mausoleum of Jaume I	City Hall of Tarragona; Plaça Ajuntament	Commissioned by the Comissió de Monuments de Tarragona in 1906 to house the remains of James I of Aragon, it was not completed in life of Lluís Domènech and it was finished by his son, Pere Domènech. Delays and changes of opinion in where to lay the remains of James I made it so that the mausoleum was not placed where it is today until 1992. It never housed the remains of James I.	Good	

== Other works ==
- In Barcelona:
  - Casa Maria Montaner in Ronda Universitat 4, was a building owned by his mother that architect reformed. Currently disappeared.
  - Torre Simon, in Gràcia. It was the mansion of Josep Simon, member of Ramon de Montaner of the editorial Montaner i Simon. Currently, the space much modified and expanded, occupies the School Corma.
  - Housing in carrer Trafalgar 54, which has been refurbished.
- In Canet de Mar:
  - Nau industrial Jover, Serra i Cia. (1899–1900) disappeared.
  - Unfinished pantheon of the family Montaner-Malató (1899).
  - Creu de Terme of l'Aubó (1908) partially disappeared.
- In Santander.
  - Pantheon of Marquis of Satrústegui.

== See also ==
- Eugenio Fernández Quintanilla

== Sources ==
- "Lluís Domènech i Montaner", Fundació Antoni Tàpies

The Spanish Wikipedia and the Catalan Wikipedia were used as sources for this article.
