= Casa Gasull =

Building in Reus, Catalonia, Spain

Coordinates: 41°9′22.56″N 1°6′13.50″E

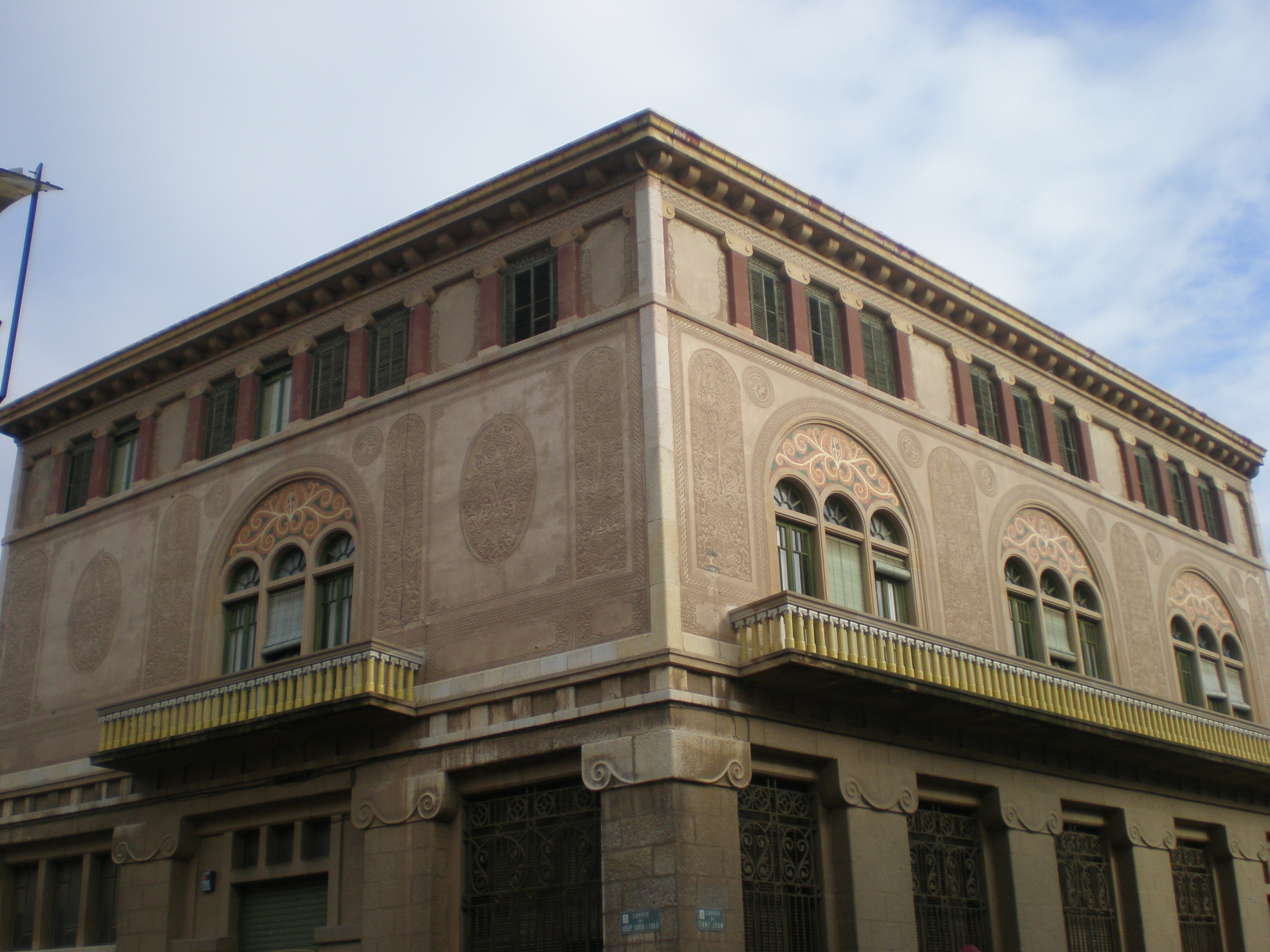
Casa Gasull.

The Casa Gasull is a building in Reus, Catalonia, Spain, designed by Modernista architect Lluís Domènech i Montaner.

== Background ==
The Casa Gasull was designed in 1910 and was finished in 1912. The building is close to Casa Rull, another Catalan Modernista building, also designed by Domènech i Montaner.

== See also ==
- Lluís Domènech i Muntaner
- Reus
- Modernisme
