= Castle of Santa Florentina =

11th-century castle in Catalonia, Spain

Coordinates: 41.6008°N 2.5770°E

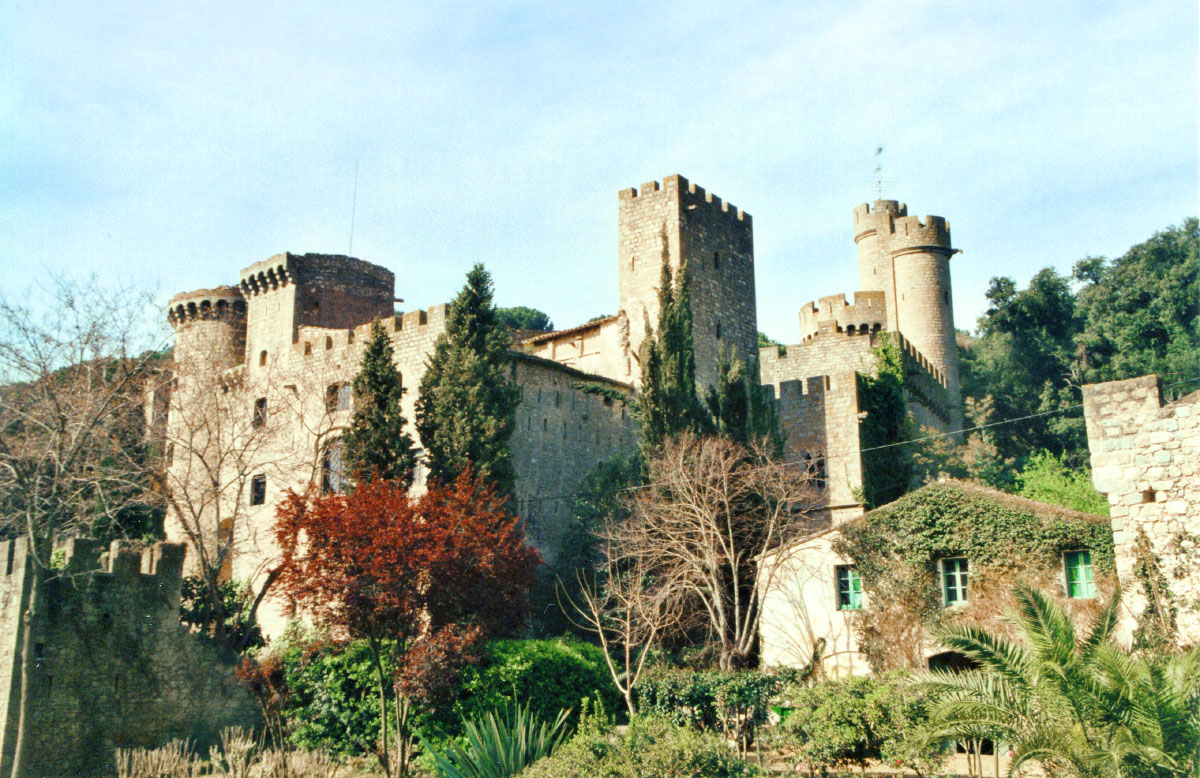
Castle of Santa Florentina

The Castle of Santa Florentina (Catalan: Castell de Santa Florentina, Spanish: Castillo de Santa Florentina) is an 11th-century medieval castle in Canet de Mar, Catalonia, Spain.

It was built on the foundations of an Ancient Roman villa by Guadimir de Canet (born 1024). In the 16th century, it passed into the hands of Dimas Muntaner. In 1908, it hosted King Alfonso XIII, who made the castle's owner Ramon de Montaner i Vila count of Canet. In 1910, the castle was expanded and renovated by the modernist architect Lluís Domènech i Montaner, and its facade acquired some gargoyles by the sculptor Carles Flotats i Galtés. The magazine Architectural Digest covered the castle as among the "most beautiful houses in the world" in 1998 on account of its harmonious fusion of Gothic and Modernist designs.

The castle is listed as a cultural heritage monument (Bé d'interès cultural), no. RI-51-0005232. It is private property and hosts a museum that can be visited by appointment, as well as a yearly festival of classical music. Among the museum's collections are many works by Catalan artists dating back to the early 20th century. In 2015, the castle was a setting for the sixth season of the fantasy television series Game of Thrones.
