= Casa Rull (Reus) =

Building in Reus, Catalonia, Spain

Coordinates: 41.1562°N 1.1040°E

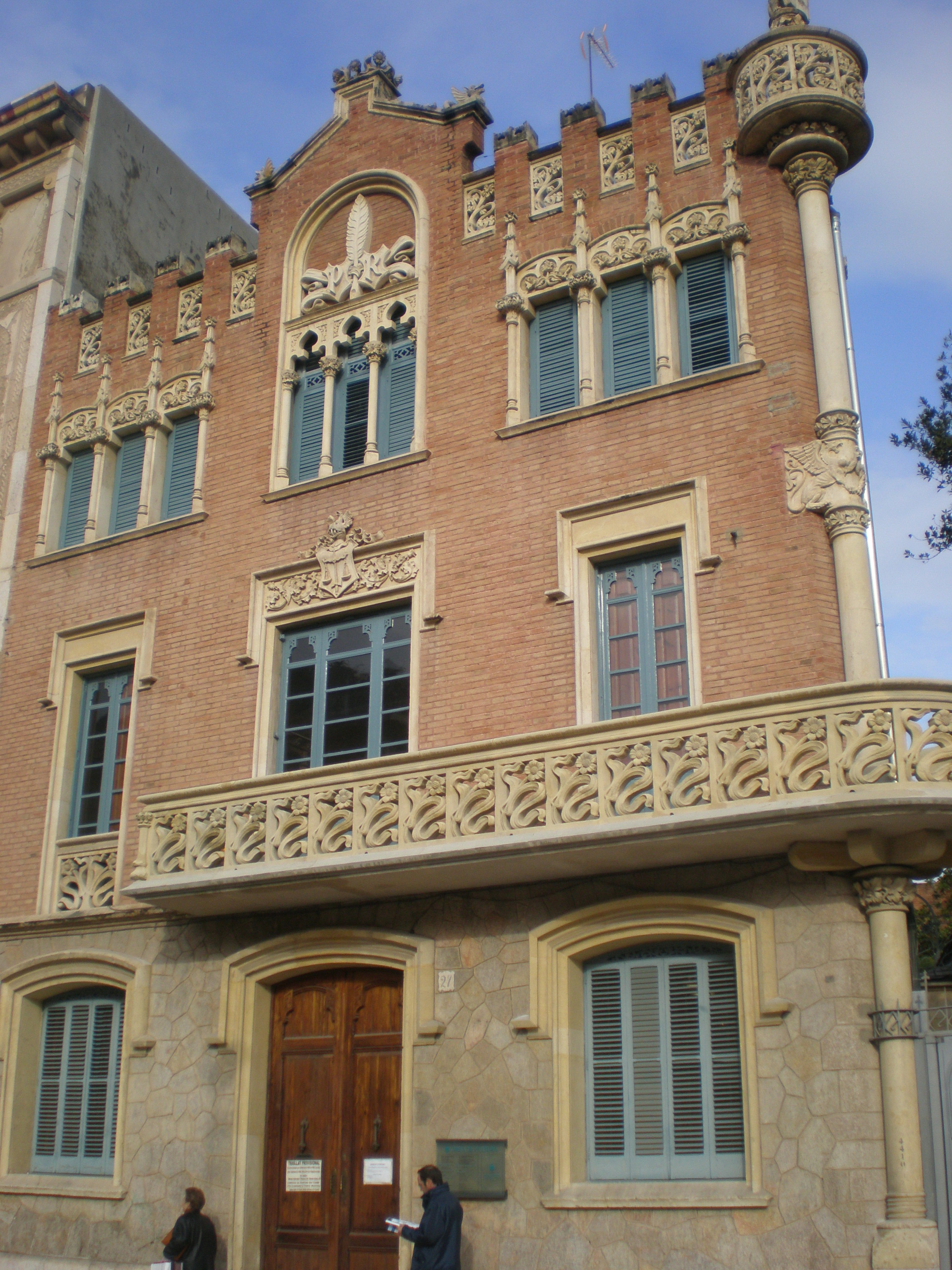
Casa Rull.

The Casa Rull is a building located at Carrer de Sant Joan, 27, 43201 in Reus, Catalonia, Spain. Since 1925, the City Council of Reus has owned the building, and is currently the headquarters of the Institute of Cultural Action for Reus. The building was designed in 1900 by the Modernista architect Lluís Domènech i Montaner and commissioned by the notary Pere Rull i Trilla of Reus. In 1996, it was renovated by the local architect Joan Figuerola.

The building is in the Modernista style and has architectural, historical, artistic, cultural and social importance. It is adjacent to another Modernista building designed by Lluís Domènech i Muntaner, the Casa Gasull. Nowadays, as a public building of the city council, some cultural events take part in the building and the garden surrounding the building.

== See also ==
- Lluís Domènech i Montaner
- Reus
- Modernisme
