= Tarrats =

Tarrats is a surname. Notable people with the surname include:

- Elena Tarrats, Spanish actress and singer
- Pere Caselles i Tarrats, Spanish architect
- Rubén Colón Tarrats, Puerto Rican composer
