= Reus =

- Municipality
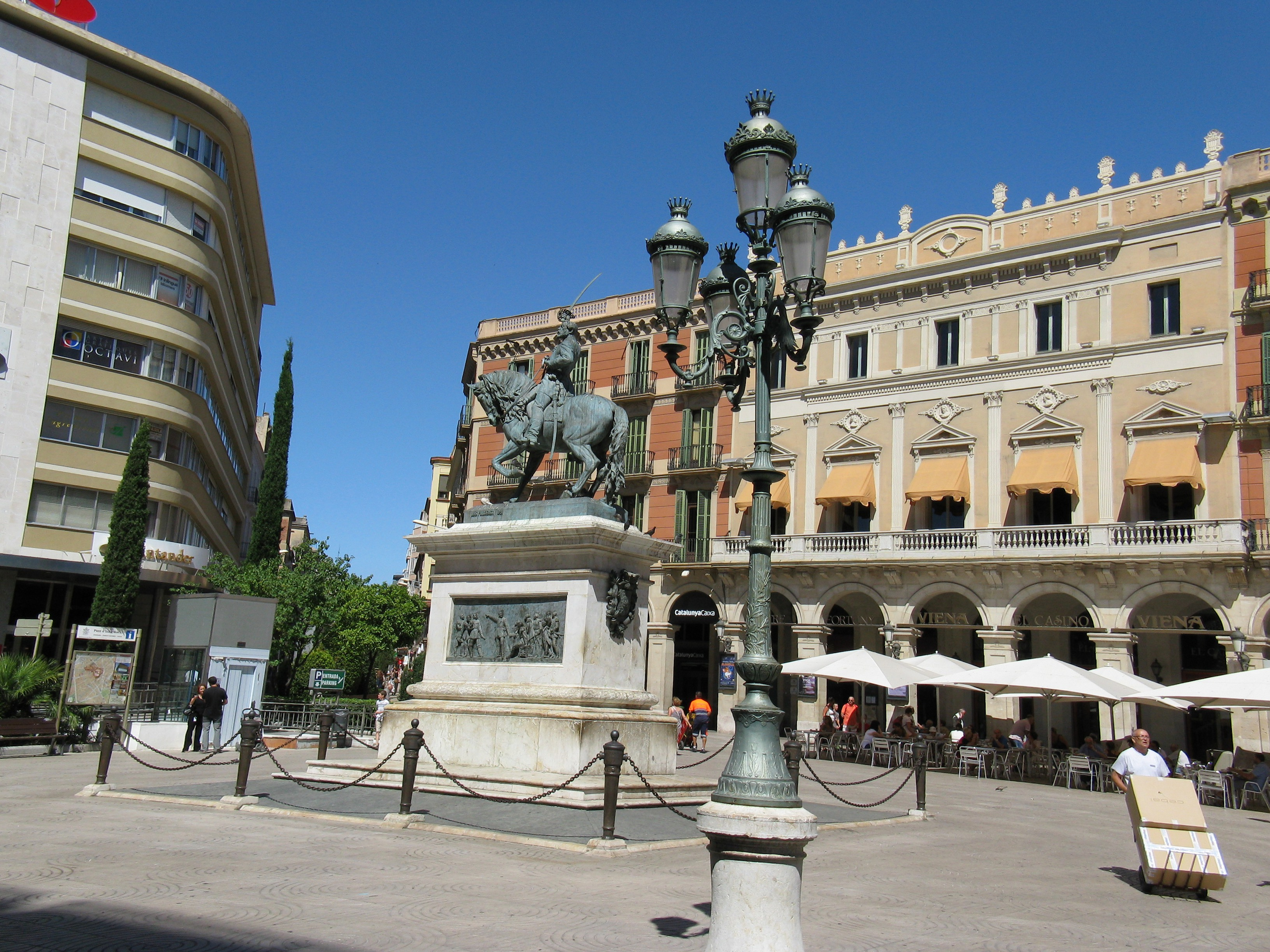
- Monument to Joan Prim

- Flag Coat of arms
- Location of Reus
- Location in Baix Camp county

- Location within Catalonia Location within Spain
- Coordinates: 41.156°N 1.108°E
- Sovereign state: Spain
- Community: Catalonia
- Region: Camp de Tarragona
- County: Baix Camp
- Province: Tarragona

Government
  - Mayor: Sandra Guaita (2023) (PSC)

Area
  - Total: 52.8 km^{2} (20.4 sq mi)
- Elevation: 134 m (440 ft)

Population (2025-01-01)
  - Total: 111,601
  - Density: 2,110/km^{2} (5,470/sq mi)
- Demonym(s): Reusenc, -ca
- Climate: Csa
- Website: www.reus.cat

Reus (Catalan pronunciation: [ˈrɛws]) is the capital of Baix Camp, in Camp de Tarragona, Catalonia, Spain. It has a population of 111,601 (register office, 2025).

Reus is a producer of wines and spirits, and gained significance during the Phylloxera plague. Currently it is known for its commercial activity, as a center for rock climbing, and as the birthplace of architect Antoni Gaudí.

== Name ==
The origin of the name Reus is a subject of debate. One theory is that Reus comes from the Latin word used to describe convict prisoners (reus), and as such, it would be a Roman penitentiary. Currently, the most accepted theory is that the name has Celtic roots, from the root red that originated the name redis (or reddis), that approximately meaning 'place on the way' or 'crossroads settlement.'

== History ==
=== Foundation and early history ===
c. 1150 Robert d'Aguiló repopulated the region of Reus, after receiving it on 3 June 1154. On 5 June 1154 the archbishop of Tarragona gave two-thirds of Reus to Bertran de Castellet, as a castellan, with the order to build a church. At this time the city was known as Redis or Reddis. The castellan Bernat de Bell-lloc granted Reus the title of town on 3 August 1183, establishing a census to fund farmland and recognizing the town's vassalage towards the archbishopric of Tarragona. On 2 June 1186 the camerlengo Joan de Santboi confirmed the rights of Reus to town status.

=== Camerlengo, Popes and Archbishops of Tarragona ===
In 1305 Reus revolted against the Archbishop Rodrigo Tello, who wanted the citizens of Reus to pay for rebuilding the walls of Tarragona. In 1309 the king of Aragon gave Reus the right to hold a market on Mondays. Bernard de Cabrera became the new castellan, but in 1335 the castellan was sold to Pere Mulet, whose heirs sold their title to Bernat d'Olzinelles in 1349. The camerlengo Pere Roger de Belfort disputed the domain to the Archbishop López de Ayerbe, who sent an army that attacked Reus. A second attack was repulsed. A third attack led to military occupation of the town. The camerlengo Pere Roger de Belfort, nephew of Pope Clement VI, persuaded the Pope to call the archbishop of Tarragona and the Pope received a commitment for peace. Pere Roger de Belfort added his rose to coat of arms of the town and when he became Pope Gregory XI, he added a papal tiara and the keys of St. Peter to the town's coat of arms.

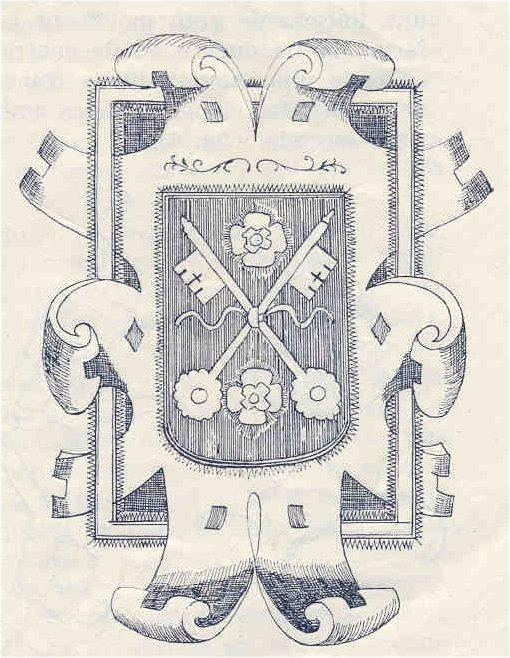
Coat of arms, 1567

=== Catalan Revolt war and the Archduke Charles ===
In 1641 the town was occupied by the French general La Mothe.

Reus was loyal to Philip V until 1705, but the town, led by Joan Nebot, revolted in favor of the Archduke Charles. On 3 July 1706 Archduke Charles came to the town. In 1707 the town fell to the Bourbons. In 1710 Reus returned to the control of Archduke Charles. On 5 June 1712 the wife of the Archduke, Elisabeth Christine, gave the title of imperial city to Reus. In 1713 Reus was occupied finally by the Bourbon.

=== Growth in the eighteenth century ===
In the eighteenth century Reus had extreme growth and became the second city of the principality of Catalonia. The walls were demolished in 1766. The town developed the textile trade and the liquor trade. Reus, along with London and Paris, were considered centers of liquor production. The rights to construction of a canal between Reus and Salou, proposed by Pere Sunyer were granted in 1805, but construction was stopped because of the French War. At this time Reus had consulates in the United States, Liguria, England, Holland, Sweden, Ragusa, Denmark, Sicily, the Papal States, France, Portugal, Naples and Prussia.

=== 19th and 20th centuries ===
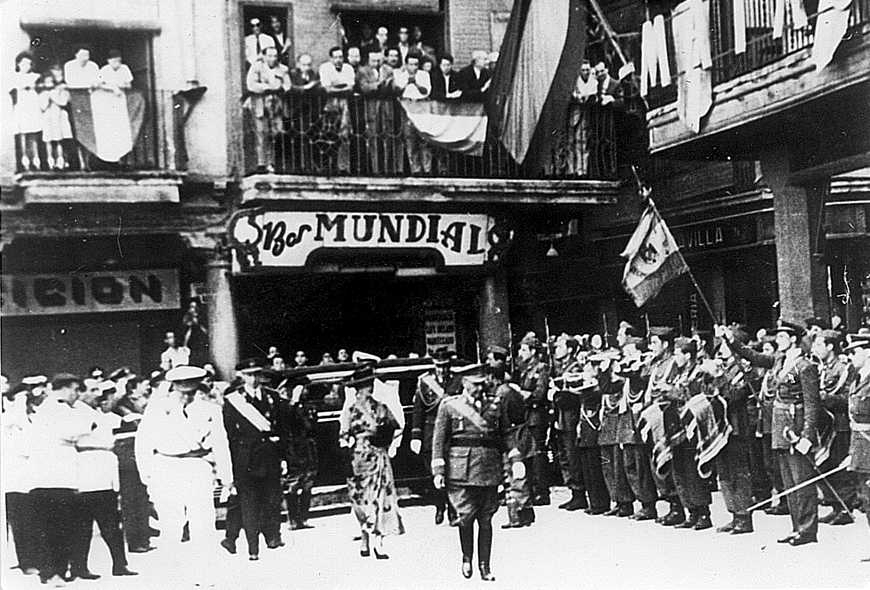
Francisco Franco in Reus, 1940

In 1854 the Reus Gas Company was founded. In 1856 the railway between Reus and Tarragona was built. In 1884 the Catalan Association of Reus was founded, and in 1893 the Assembly of the Unió Catalana met in Reus. In 1886 Pau Font de Rubinat founded the Catalan newspaper Lo Somatent. In 1895 the phylloxera killed big areas of vineyards in the region of Reus and many of these areas started growing hazelnuts.

In 1931 Reus voted for the republic. In 1936 Francisco Franco bombed the city until his rebel army occupied the city on 15 January 1939, starting the dictatorship of Franco until his death in 1975.

The first democratic mayor after Franco was Carles Martí Massagué, a lawyer from Reus. In 1983 Anton Borrell Marcó was the new mayor of the city, but he died in a car accident on the road from Reus to Cambrils. His successor was Juan Maria Roig. After him, Josep Abelló Padró was the mayor until 1999, replaced by Lluís Miquel Pérez Segura, who occupied the position until 2011, when the current mayor, Carles Pellicer i Punyed, started.

== Demography ==
Reus was for long the second city of Catalonia with a population of 14,440 in 1787 and 27,257 in 1860. It was overtaken by Tarragona and Lleida between 1900 and 1930. The population barely grew between 1920 and 1930, with 30,266 and 35,950 inhabitants, respectively. From then, the population growth has been substantial, from 41,014 inhabitants in 1960 to 108,100 inhabitants that the city has as of the end of 2008. Immigration, mostly from Marrakesh, has been a portion of that increase. About 6% are Muslim and 8% from other religions.

According to the 2006 official Spanish census, Reus is the 9th most populous city in Catalonia and the 59th in Spain.

1900	1930	1950	1970	1986	2006	2011
26,681	31,299	35,950	59,904	81,145	101,767	106,709

== Climate ==
Reus has a hot-summer mediterranean climate (Csa on the Köppen climate classification), bordering on a cold semi-arid climate (Köppen: BSk). It has mild, moderately dry winters and hot, dry, moderately muggy summers. Autumn is the rainiest season of the year, especially due to the cold drop that occurs in the months of September and October.

Climate data for Reus Airport (REU) (1991–2010), extremes (1952–present)
Month	Jan	Feb	Mar	Apr	May	Jun	Jul	Aug	Sep	Oct	Nov	Dec	Year
Record high °C (°F)	24.7 (76.5)	25.0 (77.0)	27.7 (81.9)	30.2 (86.4)	33.4 (92.1)	36.8 (98.2)	38.8 (101.8)	39.8 (103.6)	34.5 (94.1)	32.5 (90.5)	28.8 (83.8)	23.7 (74.7)	39.8 (103.6)
Mean daily maximum °C (°F)	14.5 (58.1)	15.4 (59.7)	17.7 (63.9)	19.7 (67.5)	23.1 (73.6)	27.1 (80.8)	29.8 (85.6)	30.2 (86.4)	26.7 (80.1)	22.9 (73.2)	18.0 (64.4)	15.0 (59.0)	21.7 (71.0)
Daily mean °C (°F)	9.2 (48.6)	9.9 (49.8)	12.2 (54.0)	14.3 (57.7)	17.8 (64.0)	21.8 (71.2)	24.7 (76.5)	25.2 (77.4)	21.7 (71.1)	17.9 (64.2)	12.8 (55.0)	9.8 (49.6)	16.4 (61.6)
Mean daily minimum °C (°F)	3.8 (38.8)	4.3 (39.7)	6.6 (43.9)	8.9 (48.0)	12.4 (54.3)	16.5 (61.7)	19.6 (67.3)	20.1 (68.2)	16.7 (62.1)	12.8 (55.0)	7.6 (45.7)	4.6 (40.3)	11.2 (52.1)
Record low °C (°F)	−7.6 (18.3)	−8.0 (17.6)	−5.4 (22.3)	−2.5 (27.5)	3.6 (38.5)	7.4 (45.3)	10.5 (50.9)	10.8 (51.4)	5.5 (41.9)	0.2 (32.4)	−4.0 (24.8)	−7.5 (18.5)	−8.0 (17.6)
Average precipitation mm (inches)	29 (1.1)	24 (0.9)	34 (1.3)	41 (1.6)	45 (1.8)	22 (0.9)	15 (0.6)	37 (1.5)	73 (2.9)	73 (2.9)	48 (1.9)	34 (1.3)	475 (18.7)
Average precipitation days (≥ 1 mm)	3.7	3.1	3.9	5.0	4.8	2.9	2.1	3.1	4.9	5.6	4.6	3.8	47.5
Average snowy days	0.1	0.1	0.1	0	0	0	0	0	0	0	0	0	0.3
Average relative humidity (%)	68	66	65	65	63	60	60	63	67	72	70	70	66
Mean monthly sunshine hours	167	178	211	231	264	294	319	276	222	189	165	158	2,674
Percentage possible sunshine	56	59	57	58	59	65	70	65	59	55	56	55	60
Source: Agencia Estatal de Meteorología

== Economy ==
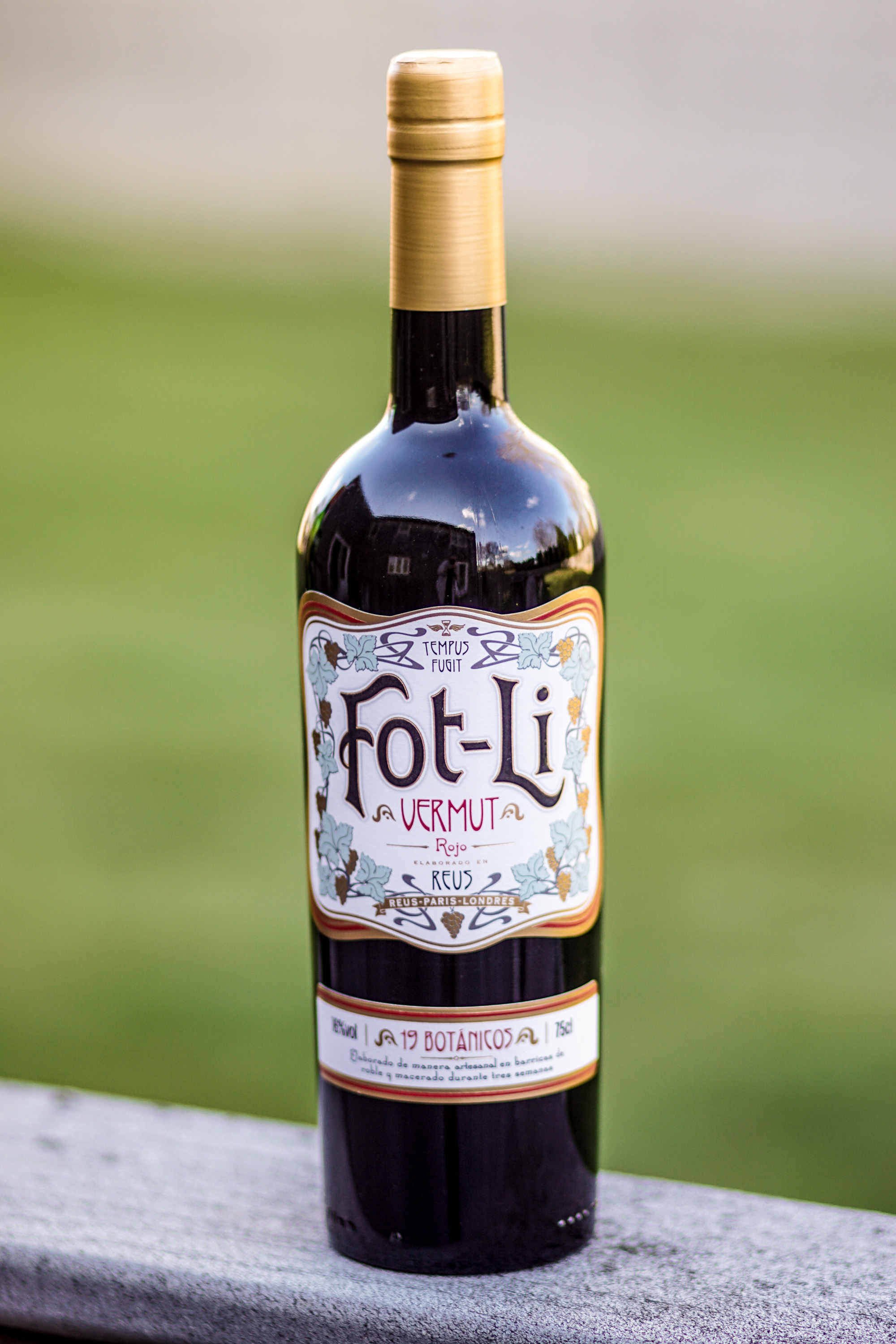
Fot-Li Vermouth is made and bottled in Reus

During the 19th and 20th centuries Reus became known as one of the world's major centers of liquor production, and was home to over 30 producers of vermouth. Today Reus is home to major exporters of vermouth including Yzaguirre, Iris (Muller), Miró, and Fot-Li.

== Infrastructure ==
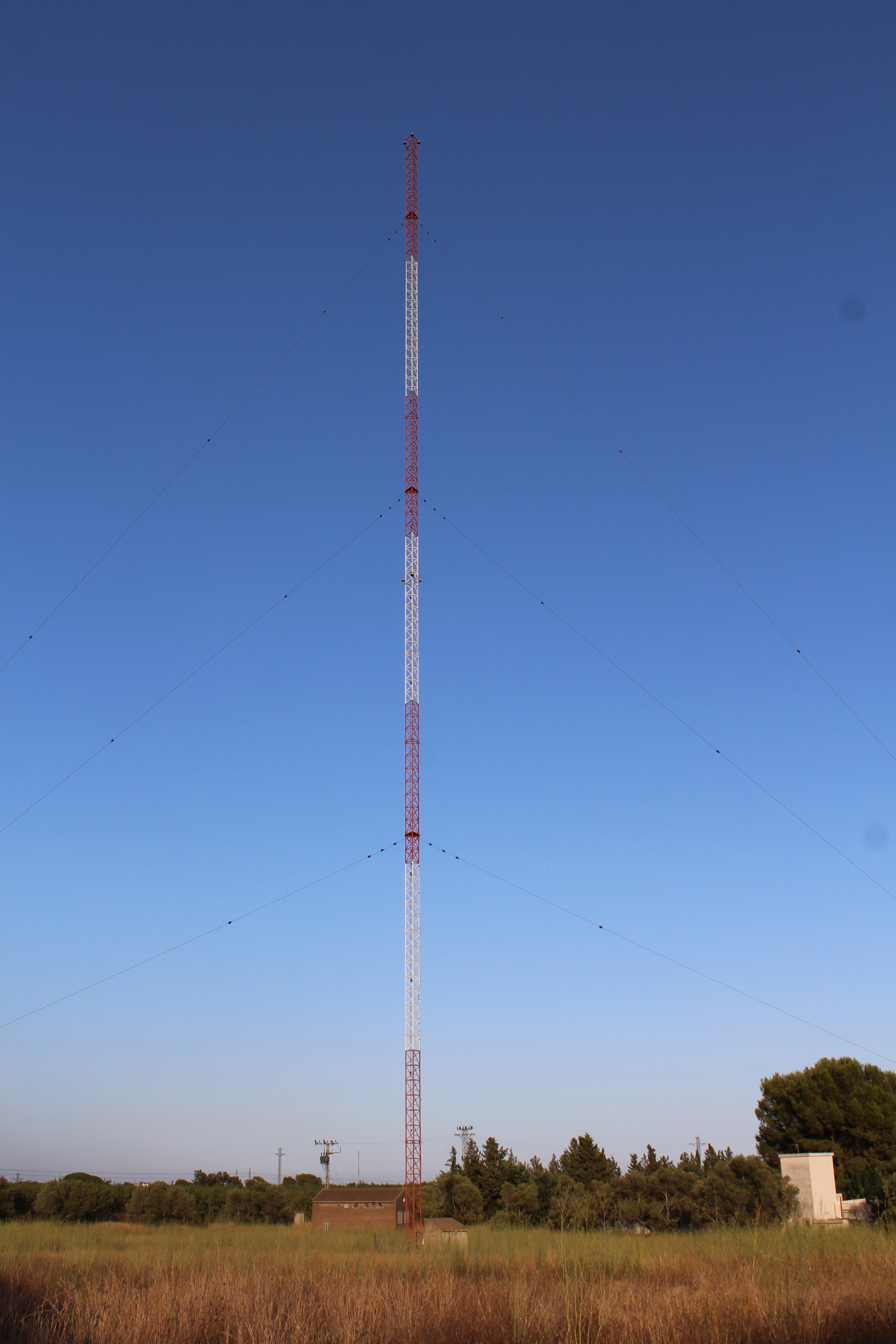
Antenna mast of Reus SER mediumwave transmitter

At Reus, there is at 41° 06′ 41,51″ N, 1° 05′ 40,03″ E a mediumwave broadcasting transmitter of SER used for transmitting on 1026 kHz with 5 kW. A further mediumwave transmitter is located at 41° 06′ 38,06″ N, 1° 07′ 14,56″ O.

== Festivities ==
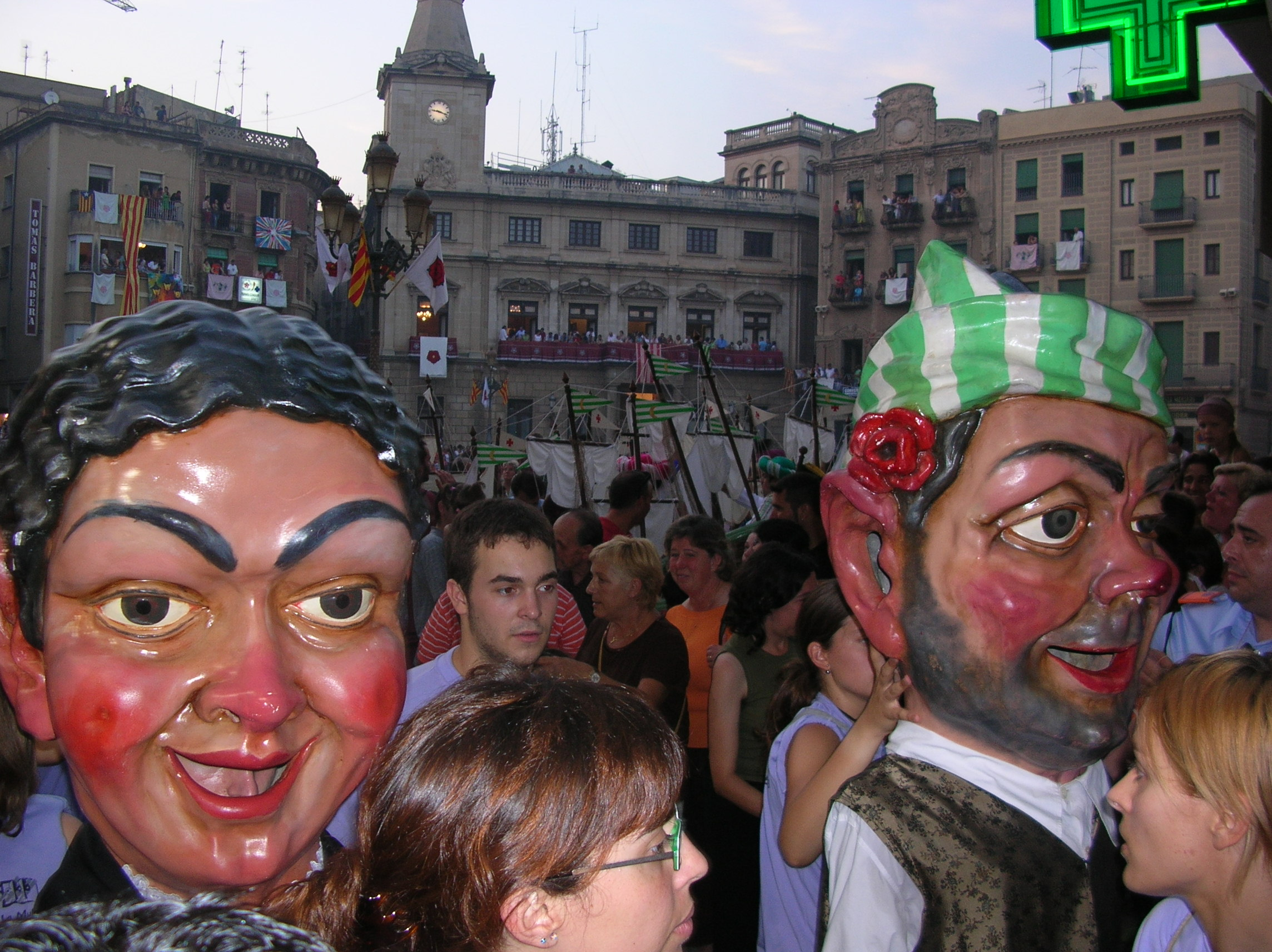
The "Nanos" of Reus.

The principal Reus festivity is Sant Pere on 29 June, declared of National Touristic Interest. On 25 September, the Mare de Déu de la Misericòrdia is held.

Other noteworthy festivities are the Carnival and the Anada a l'Antiga towards Salou. Most of the neighborhoods have their own festivities.

Besides the major festivities, Reus holds many festivals, such as Cos, a festival dedicated to mime, or El Trapezi, a festival with circus spectacles. In every odd numbered year the Reus Institut Municipal d'Accio Cultural presents the Biennals Internacionals de Fotografia Medalla Gaudi. This bi-annual exhibition features fine art photographers from around the world working in Alternative Photographic Processes (such as Platinum Printing, Gum Dichromate, Etc.). At each Biennal they award the Medalla Gaudi award to a select few artists and purchase their work for the Institut Municipal d'Accio Cultural's permanent collection.

== Sights ==
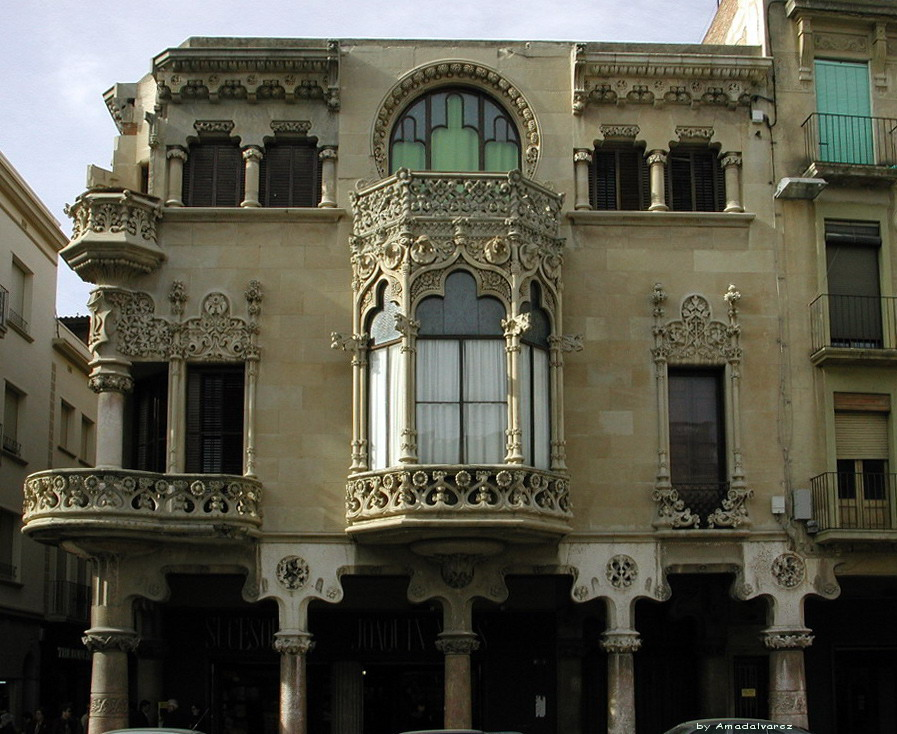
Casa Navàs.

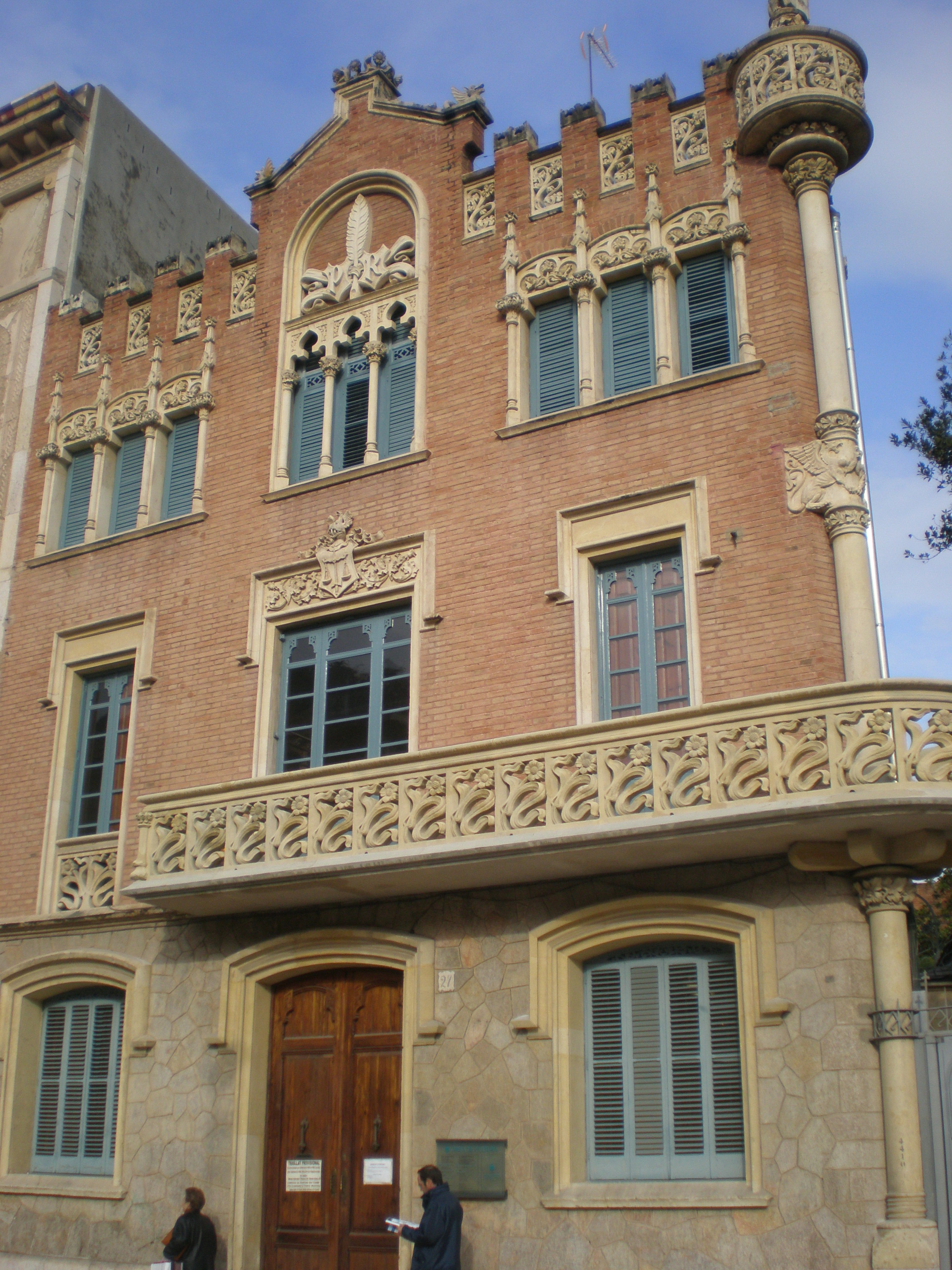
Casa Rull.

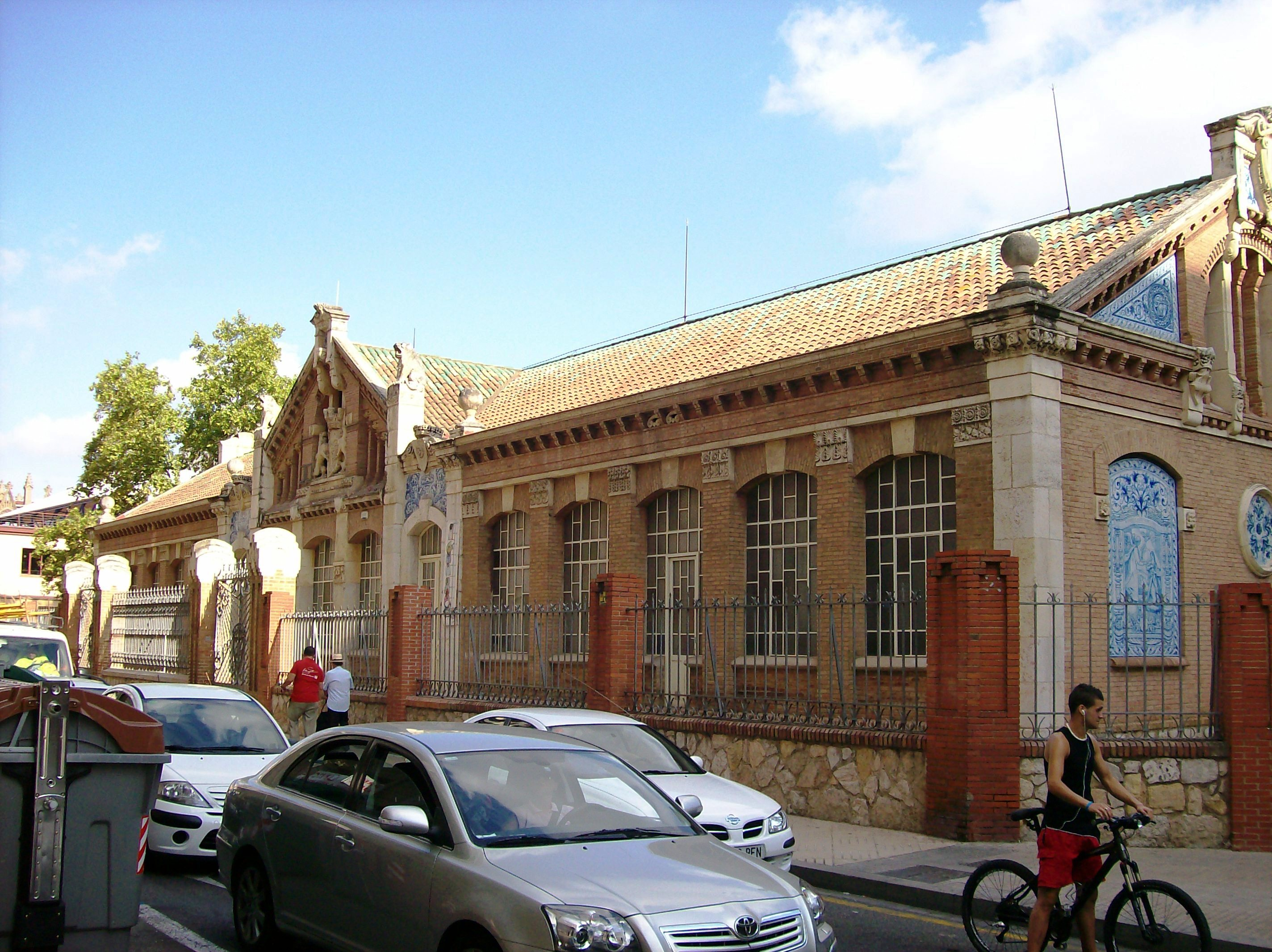
Escoles Prat de la Riba, designed by Pere Caselles i Tarrats (1911).

=== Catalan Modernist edifices ===
The city of Reus has many Catalan modernist buildings. Although Antoni Gaudí was born in Reus, there are no buildings designed by him; there are, however, numerous modernist buildings from his colleagues as Lluís Domènech i Montaner, Pere Caselles i Tarrats and Pere Domènech Roura.

- Casa Navàs, Lluís Domènech i Montaner (1901–1908)
- Casa Rull, Lluís Domènech i Montaner (1901)
- Casa Gasull, Lluís Domènech i Montaner (1910–1912)
- Institut Pere Mata, Lluís Domènech i Montaner (1899–1919)
- Casa Pinyol, Pere Caselles i Tarrats (1910)
- Escoles Prat de la Riba, Pere Caselles i Tarrats (1911)
- Escorxador, Pere Caselles i Tarrats (1899)
- Estació Enològica, Pere Caselles i Tarrats (1906–1910)
- Casa Munné, Pere Caselles i Tarrats (1904)
- Casa Sardà, Pere Caselles i Tarrats (1896)
- Casa Marco, Pere Domènech Roura (1926)
- Xalet Serra, Joan Rubió i Bellver (1911)

=== Other sights ===
- Castell del Cambrer
- Campanar de Reus
- Town Hall
- Palau Bofarull
- Centre de Lectura
- Museu Salvador Vila-seca
- Teatre Fortuny
- Gaudí Centre

== Sport ==
The city has a roller hockey team Reus Deportiu, outside of the main league, OK Liga.

The association football team was CF Reus Deportiu.

The Barcelona Dragons of the European League of Football plan to play their home games at the local Estadi Municipal.

== Tourism ==
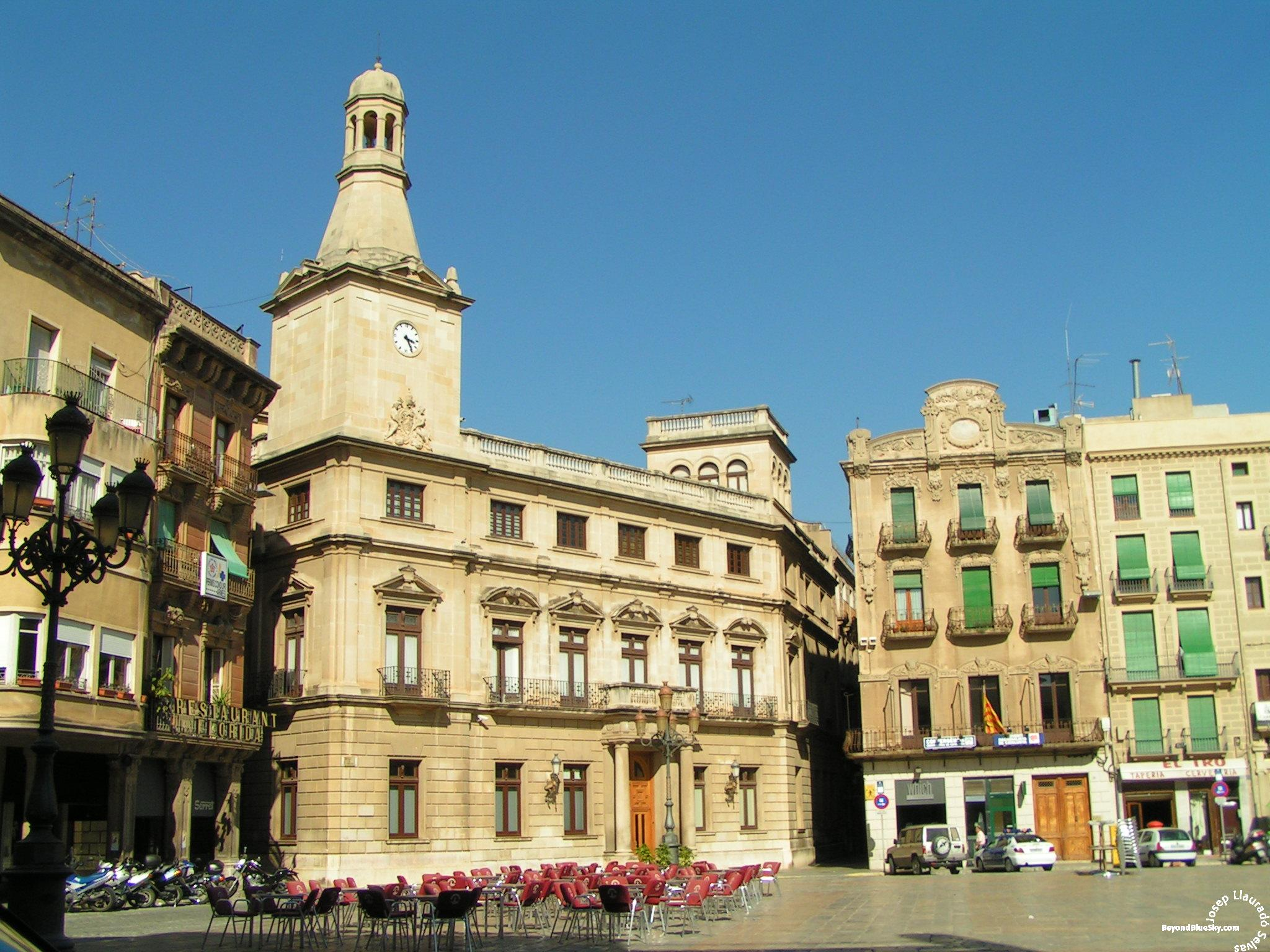
The market square.

In recent years, tourism in Reus expanded as more and more people come to the Costa Daurada region. Nowadays, the largest group of tourists comes from Russia, followed by France and Holland.

Reus is close to the resort town of Salou and one of Europe's biggest theme resorts is at PortAventura World. Tour companies and buses operate services to Reus from tourist destinations in the region such as Salou, La Pineda, and Cambrils.

The accommodation in Reus consists of small hotels, hostels, and major chained hotels owned by NH Hoteles and Hotusa Group.

Recently, Reus Airport has started to receive low cost flights from Ryanair that fly to Reus from many different European and North African locations. The airport also receives charter flights from the United Kingdom. Barcelona Airport also carries passengers into Reus.

== Transport ==
The city is served by Reus Airport which only provides flights to limited European destinations. However, residents in the city would also use Josep Tarradellas Barcelona–El Prat Airport as it provides more domestic and international destinations. The airport is located 96 km (60 mi) east of the city centre.

== Flag of Reus ==
The first flag of Reus was in use from 1774 to 1943. The flag was dark red with the city arms in the centre.

In 1943 the flag was changed because the color red seemed to be associated with the left, defeated in the Spanish Civil War (1936–39). As the historic city arms were argent with a heraldic rose the new flag was white with a heraldic rose in the center. Minor changes to the rose in the flag were made after 1943.

The rose was changed, with the version taken from the city emblem. The emblem itself has official status.

== Notable people ==
- Antònia Abelló (1913–1984), political activist, journalist, feminist
- Ramon Bosc (1300s–1416), Catalan priest and writer in Latin
- José Brocá (1805–1882), guitarist and composer
- Joan Prim i Prats (1814–1870), military general and politician
- Michael Domenec (1816–1878), bishop
- Vicente Folch (1754–1829), military officer and Governor of West Florida (1796–1811).
- Baldomer Galofre (1849–1902), painter
- Roseta Mauri i Segura (1849–1923), ballerina and dance teacher
- Antoni Gaudí (1852–1926), architect
- Ceferí Olivé (1907–1995), painter
- François Tosquelles (1912–1994), psychiatrist
- Alejandro Cao de Benós (born 1974), President of the Korean Friendship Association
- Isaac Cuenca (born 1991), football player
- Sergi Roberto (born 1992), football player
- Andreu Buenafuente (born 1965), late night show host
- Tre Borràs Cabacés (born 1958), psychiatrist and harm reduction specialist

== Twin cities ==
Reus is twinned with:

- Bahía Blanca, Argentina, since 1994
- Hadžići, Bosnia and Herzegovina, since 1995
- Astorga, Spain, since 1998
- (Western Sahara) Amgala, Sahrawi Arab Democratic Republic, since 2000
- Boyeros, Cuba, since 2000
- Gandia, Spain, since 2008
