= Lluís Domènech i Montaner House-Museum =

Museum in Canet de Mar, Catalonia, Spain

Coordinates: 41°35′18.01″N 2°34′52.87″E

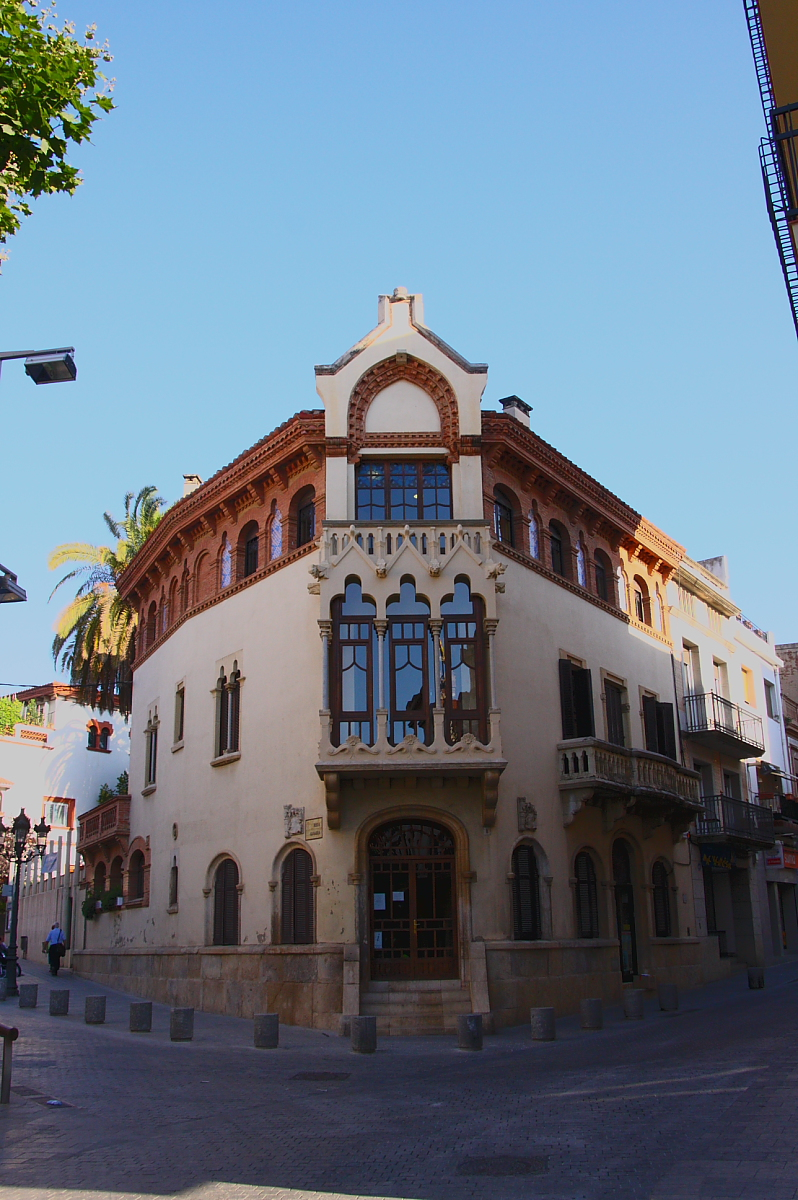
Front of the Lluís Domènech i Montaner House-Museum

The Lluís Domènech i Montaner House-Museum (Catalan: Casa Museu Lluís Domènech i Montaner), in Canet de Mar, in the region of El Maresme, is a space dedicated to the study of the life and works of architect Lluís Domènech i Montaner. The House-Museum includes the Domènech house, a work of the architect in collaboration with his son, Pere Domènech and his son-in-law, Francesc Guàrdia, and the 16th-century Can Rocosa farmhouse, which Domènech i Montaner converted into his workshop-study. The House-Museum is part of the Barcelona Provincial Council Local Museum Network.

== Exhibition ==
The Lluís Domènech i Montaner House-Museum aims to introduce visitors to the architect's way of life while he lived at his Canet de Mar residence and architectural workshop. There are blueprints, sketches and photographs, both past and current, of some of the projects of Domènech i Montaner, as well as some emblematic pieces.

The museographical project was designed and executed by Sono Tecnologia Audiovisual.
