= Casa Agustí =

Building in Badalona, Catalonia, Spain

Coordinates: 41°26′42″N 2°14′23″E

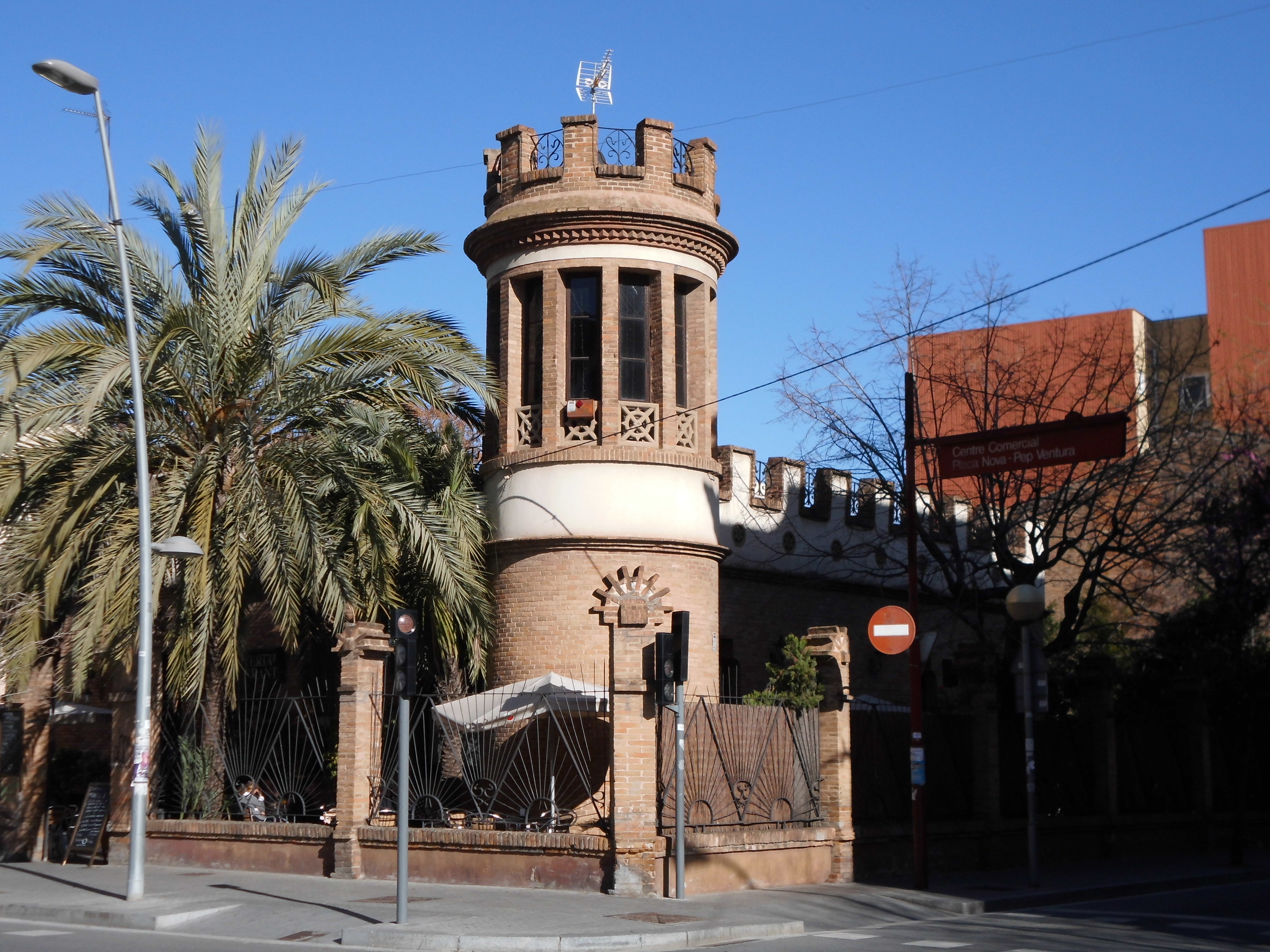
Casa Agustí

Casa Agustí is a modernista building in the Progrés quarter of Badalona (metropolitan area of Barcelona, Catalonia, Spain) built in 1893. It was designed by the renowned architect Lluís Domènech i Montaner as the residence of the engineer Eduard Agustí Saladrigas. The building became a restaurant in 1936 and currently serves food and refreshments. Among its remarkable features are the round red brick tower and the surrounding gardens. The nearest existing Barcelona Metro station is Pep Ventura, and notoriously the undergoing extension of the metro network has allegedly damaged its façade.

== See also ==
- Modernisme in Badalona
