= Institut Pere Mata =

Coordinates: 41°10′1.05″N 1°5′5.33″E

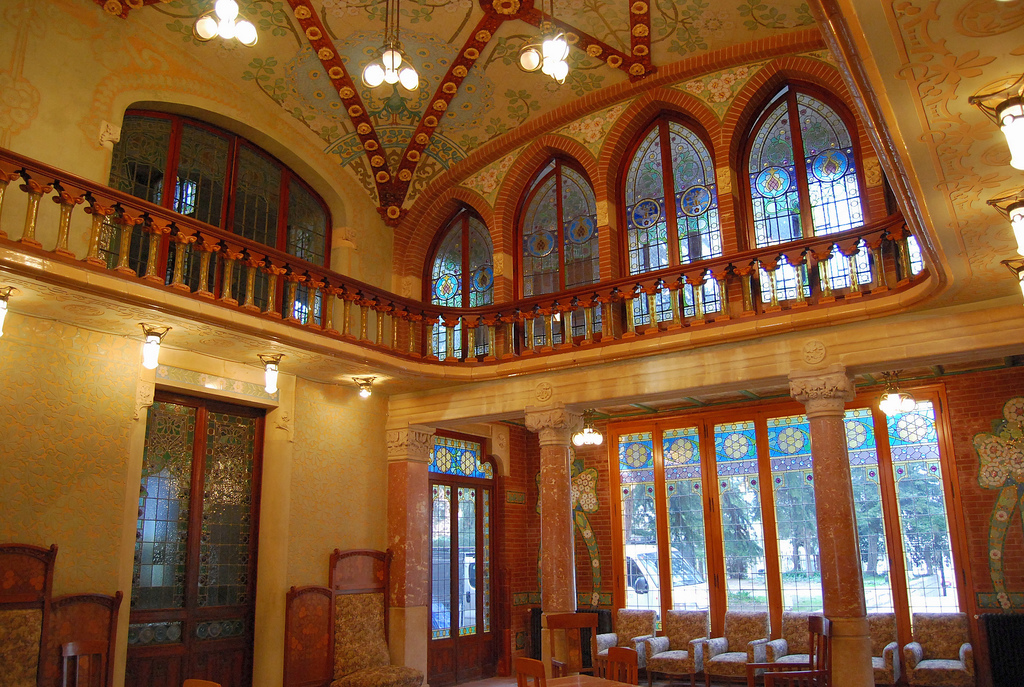
Institut Pere Mata, inside pavilion.

L'Institut Pere Mata is a psychiatric hospital in Reus, Catalonia, Spain. The building was designed by the Catalan Modernist architect Lluís Domènech i Montaner. The hospital predates Hospital Sant Pau of Barcelona and it has a similar structure. Lluís Domènech i Montaner followed the structure of different buildings for different specialities.

The building process took place from 1897 to 1912.

Currently the building is still used as a psychiatric hospital, but one of the pavilions is not in medical use anymore and can be visited.
