= Casa Pinyol =

Building in Tarragona Province, Spain

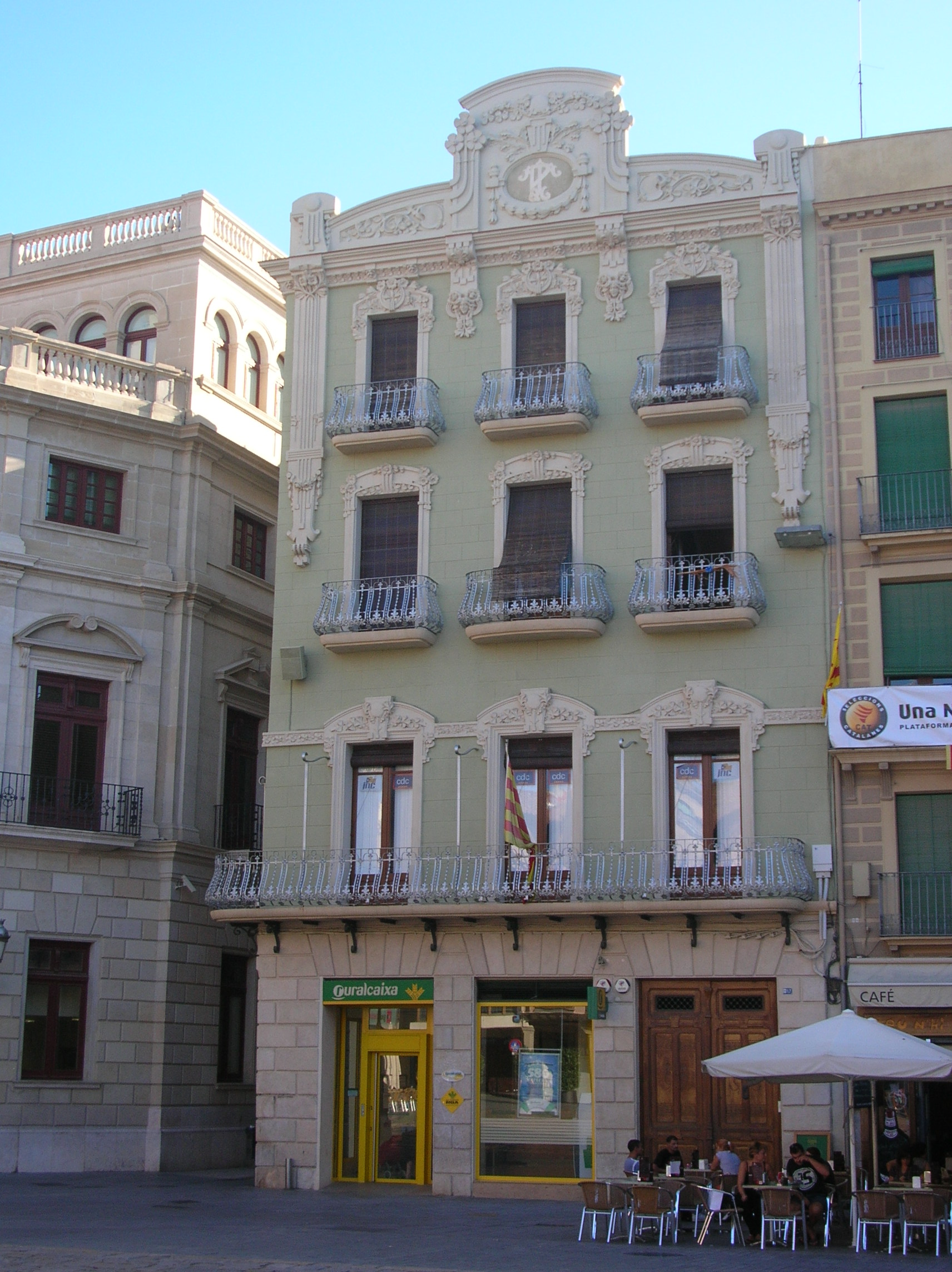
- Casa Pinyol
- Interactive map of the Casa Pinyol area

General information
- Architectural style: Modernisme
- Location: Reus, Catalonia, Spain, Plaça del Mercadal, 11
- Coordinates: 41°9′19.06″N 1°6′32.44″E
- Completed: 1910

Design and construction
- Architect: Pere Caselles i Tarrats

Casa Pinyol is a building in Reus, Catalonia, Spain, designed by the Modernist architect Pere Caselles i Tarrats. The Casa Pinyol was built in 1910. As of 2010 it is used as the head office of the Catalan party Convergència Democràtica de Catalunya in the city of Reus.

== See also ==
- Reus
- Modernisme
