= Casa Navàs =

Modernist building in Reus, Catalonia, Spain

Coordinates: 41°9′18.94″N 1°6′30.73″E

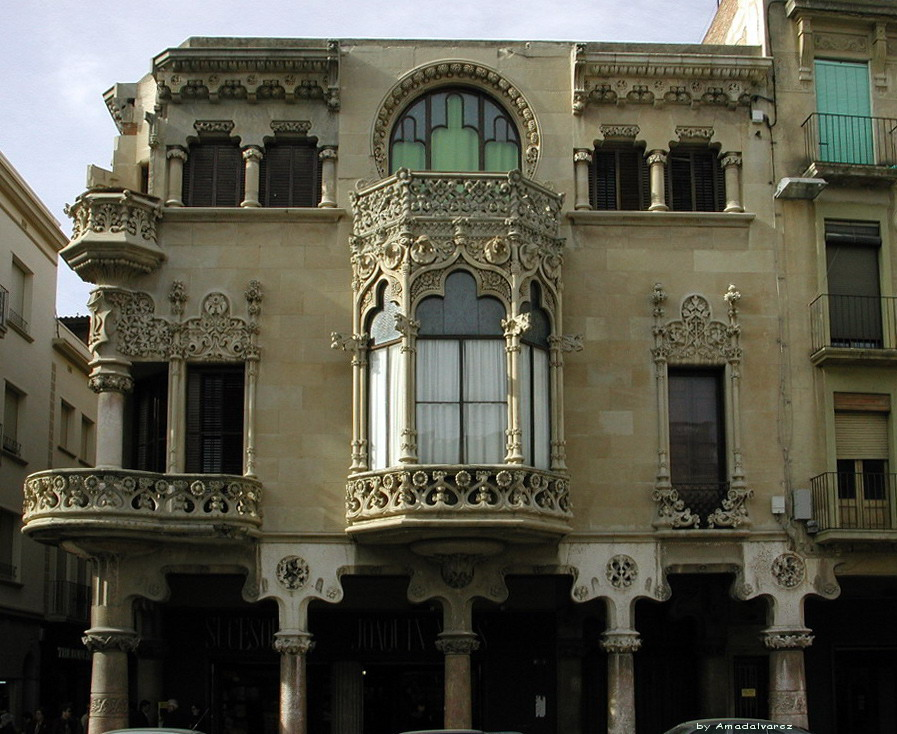
Casa Navàs.

Casa Navàs is a modernist building in the city of Reus, Catalonia, Spain. Casa Navàs is a building designed by Catalan architect Lluís Domènech i Montaner, located in the city's Plaça del Mercadal.

Joaquim Navàs Padró of Reus contracted Lluís Domènech i Muntaner as the architect of his new house. The building was constructed from 1901 to 1908.

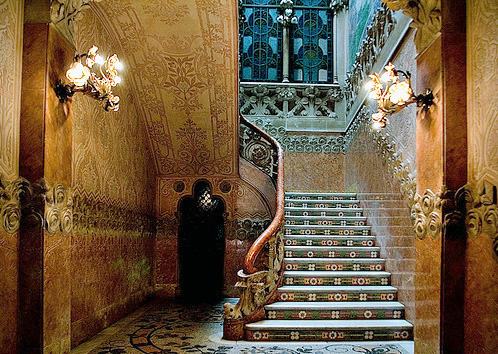
Inside view.

The building had a tower on the left facade, but it was destroyed by bombing by Nationalist forces during the Spanish Civil War and never rebuilt. Inside the building is a very wide and brightly lit space. Marble works were done by Alfons Juyol i Bach, the paintings by Tomàs Bergadà, the furniture by Gaspar Homar and the ceramics by Hipòlit Montseny; all of them under the instructions of Lluís Domènech i Montaner.

Nowadays the building is still the same as it was originally, which includes the furniture, the ceramics, mosaics, lights, etc. The tower has been reconstructed in 2025-2026 and on November, 12th 2026, there will be a historic inauguration of the renewed tower.
