= Pere Caselles i Tarrats =

Spanish Catalan Modernist architect

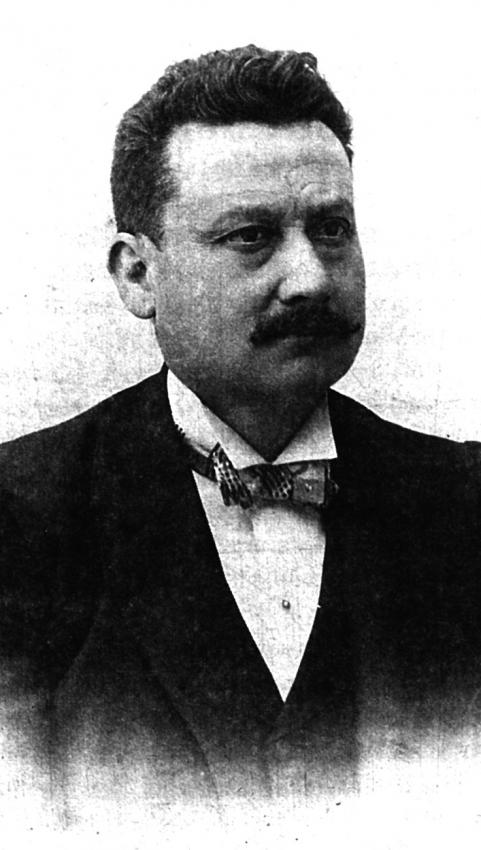
portrait of portrait of Pere Caselles i Tarrats

Pere Caselles i Tarrats (1 November 1864 - 28 July 1936) was a Spanish Catalan Modernist architect.

Born at Reus, he studied in Barcelona where he graduated in architecture in 1889. He worked mostly in his native town of Reus, designing civil buildings and private residences. These include the Casa Grau, Casa Iglesias, Casa Munné, Casa Pinyol, Casa Querol, Casa Sardà, Casa Tomàs Jordi, Casa Punyet, Casa Seharra, Casa Tarrats and the Prat de la Riba public school.

He was assassinated during the early stages of the Spanish Civil War.
