= Sant Agustí =

Sant Agustí may refer to:

- Sant Agustí de Lluçanès, municipality in the comarca of Osona
- Sant Agustí des Vedrà, village in the municipality of Sant Josep de sa Talaia, Ibiza
