= Timeline of Art Nouveau =

Notable works and moments in the international art style

**Table cells' colours show the type of works or events**
Works of architecture or of total art
Exhibitions, tours, foundings of magazines, movements, colonies, galleries, cafes
Posters, paintings, printings, graphic art and stained glass
Other works

The Timeline of Art Nouveau shows notable works and events of Art Nouveau (an international style of art, architecture and applied art) as well as of local movements included in it (Modernisme, Glasgow School, Vienna Secession, Jugendstil, Stile Liberty, Tiffany Style and others).

Main events are written in bold.

If two or more objects or events are presented any given year, a work or an event featured in "Images" column is italicized.

Objects included in UNESCO World Heritage List are marked with asterisk*.

**Movements within Art Nouveau**	Art Nouveau of Belgium and France	Catalan Modernisme	Modern Style and Glasgow School in Britain	Secession and Jugendstil in Northern and Central Europe	Stile Liberty, Tiffany Style and other local variations	Image
1887		Güell Pavilions featuring trencadís technique were finished by Antoni Gaudí in Barcelona				
1888		Castle of the Three Dragons was built by Lluís Domènech i Montaner for **Universal Exposition in Barcelona**				
1890		Palau Güell* was finished by Antoni Gaudí in Barcelona			Stained-glass window Education was created by Louis Comfort Tiffany's Tiffany Glass Company for Yale University	
1892		Casa Botines was completed by Antoni Gaudí and Llorenç Matamala i Piñol in León		Munich Secession was founded by 96 artists in Munich		
1893	**Hotel Tassel* by Victor Horta and Maison Hankar by Paul Hankar were completed in Brussels**	Mercat de la Llibertat was built by Miquel Pascual i Tintorer and Francesc Berenguer i Mestres in Barcelona	The Studio magazine was founded by Charles Holme in London			
1893	The poster for Grafton Galleries was drawn by Eugène Grasset in Paris	Mercat de la Llibertat was built by Miquel Pascual i Tintorer and Francesc Berenguer i Mestres in Barcelona	The Studio magazine was founded by Charles Holme in London			
1894	Salon des Cent was founded by Léon Deschamps in Paris	The Vile Club was painted by Ramon Casas in Barcelona			"The Inland Printer" magazine cover was created by Will H. Bradley	
1895	**Maison de l'Art Nouveau was opened by Siegfried Bing in Paris**			Pan magazine was founded and published by Otto Julius Bierbaum, Julius Meier-Graefe, and Richard Dehmel in Berlin		
1895	A poster for Gismonda by Alphonse Mucha was published in Paris			Pan magazine was founded and published by Otto Julius Bierbaum, Julius Meier-Graefe, and Richard Dehmel in Berlin		
1896	The poster for the cabaret Le Chat noir was created by Theophile-Alexandre Steinlen in Paris	Casa Martí was built by Josep Puig i Cadafalch in Barcelona		Simplicissimus and **Jugend magazines were founded** by Albert Langen and Georg Hirth respectively in Munich		
1896	The Bloemenwerf was completed by Henry Van de Velde in Brussels	Casa Martí was built by Josep Puig i Cadafalch in Barcelona		The Museum of Applied Arts was finished by Ödön Lechner in Budapest		
1897	Art & Décoration magazine was founded in France	Els Quatre Gats cafe featuring interior by Ramon Casas was opened in Barcelona		**Vienna Secession was founded** by Gustav Klimt, Koloman Moser, Josef Hoffmann, Joseph Maria Olbrich, and others and was joined by Otto Wagner in Vienna		
1897	International Exposition was held in Brussels	Bodegas Güell were built by Antoni Gaudí in Garraf (Sitges)		Five Swans tapestry was completed by Otto Eckmann		
1898	The Castel Béranger was completed by Hector Guimard in Paris		The Fox and Anchor building was built by Latham Withall and William James Neatby in London	The Secession Hall was finished by Joseph Maria Olbrich, Koloman Moser, and Othmar Schimkowitz in Vienna	Mir iskusstva artistic movement was founded by Alexandre Benois, Konstantin Somov, Dmitry Filosofov, Léon Bakst, and Eugene Lansere in Saint Petersburg	
1898	The "Dragonfly Lady" brooch was made by René Lalique		The Fox and Anchor building was built by Latham Withall and William James Neatby in London	The first issue of Ver Sacrum magazine with cover by Alfred Roller was published in Vienna	Mir iskusstva artistic movement was founded by Alexandre Benois, Konstantin Somov, Dmitry Filosofov, Léon Bakst, and Eugene Lansere in Saint Petersburg	
1899	Nature Unveiling Herself Before Science was sculpted by Louis-Ernest Barrias in Paris	A house for Ramon Casas is built by Antoni Rovira i Rabassa in Barcelona	The Ruchill Church Hall and Queen's Cross Church were finished by Charles Rennie Mackintosh in Glasgow	Darmstadt Artists' Colony* was founded by Ernest Ludwig, Grand Duke of Hesse in Darmstadt, German Empire	Mir iskusstva started issuing the eponymic magazine edited by Sergei Diaghilev in Saint Petersburg	
1899	The first extension of Hôtel van Eetvelde* was finished by Victor Horta in Brussels	A house for Ramon Casas is built by Antoni Rovira i Rabassa in Barcelona	The Ruchill Church Hall and Queen's Cross Church were finished by Charles Rennie Mackintosh in Glasgow	Karlsplatz Stadtbahn Station by Otto Wagner and Joseph Maria Olbrich was finished in Vienna	"Mikula and Volga" maiolica fireplace was initially created by Mikhail Vrubel and Peter Vaulin	
1900	Metro station entrances by Hector Guimard, Gare de Lyon and its decorated buffet were built for the **Exposition Universelle in Paris**	Casa Rull was completed by Lluís Domènech i Montaner in Reus		Villa Schutzenberger was completed by Julius Berninger and Gustav Krafft in Straßburg, German Empire	American Hotel was completed by Willem Kromhout and Herman Gerard Jansen in Amsterdam	
1900	The 3 Square Rapp building was finished by Jules Lavirotte and Alexandre Bigot in Paris	Casa Amatller was finished by Josep Puig i Cadafalch in Barcelona		Ernst Ludwig House (now hosting Darmstadt Colony Museum) was completed by Joseph Maria Olbrich and Peter Behrens in Darmstadt, German Empire	American Hotel was completed by Willem Kromhout and Herman Gerard Jansen in Amsterdam	
1901	Victor Horta finished his own house and atelier* in Brussels	Ramon Casas and Pere Romeu in an Automobile was painted by Ramon Casas in Barcelona	The building of Everard's Printing Works by Henry Williams and William James Neatby was finished in Bristol	Gödöllő Art Colony was founded by Aladár Körösfői-Kriesch in Gödöllő, Kingdom of Hungary	Bakhrushins Tenement House was finished by Karl Hippius in Moscow	
1901	École de Nancy was founded in Nancy	Porta i tanca de la Finca Miralles was built by Antoni Gaudí in Barcelona	The Windy Hill house was completed by Charles and Margaret Macdonald Mackintosh in Kilmacolm, Scotland	Kullervo Rides to War was painted by Akseli Gallen-Kallela in Grand Duchy of Finland	Bakhrushins Tenement House was finished by Karl Hippius in Moscow	
1902	The Villa Majorelle was finished by Henri Sauvage, Louis Majorelle, and Alexandre Bigot in Nancy	Casa Lleó Morera was completed by Lluís Domènech i Montaner in Barcelona		XIV Secession exhibition featured Beethoven Frieze by Gustav Klimt, sculpture by Max Klinger and works of Alfred Roller, Adolf Böhm and other artists in Vienna	Exposition of Modern Decorative Arts was held in Turin, Kingdom of Italy	
1902	The Niké Brooch was made by Philippe Wolfers	Casa Lleó Morera was completed by Lluís Domènech i Montaner in Barcelona		Subotica Synagogue was finished by Marcell Komor and Dezső Jakab in Szabadka (now Subotica, Serbia)	Casa Fenoglio-Lafleur was finished by Pietro Fenoglio in Turin, Kingdom of Italy	
1903	Interior works were finally finished in Hôtel Solvay* by Victor Horta in Brussels	The Gran Hotel was completed by Lluís Domènech i Montaner in Palma de Mallorca	The Willow Tearooms were built by Charles Rennie Mackintosh in Glasgow	Wiener Werkstätte was founded by Josef Hoffmann and Koloman Moser in Vienna	Eliseyev Emporium was built by Gavriil Baranovsky in Saint Petersburg	
1903	Maison Saint-Cyr was finished by Gustave Strauven in Brussels	Desolation was sculpted by Josep Llimona i Bruguera in Barcelona	The Willow Tearooms were built by Charles Rennie Mackintosh in Glasgow	22, Rue du Général de Castelnau and 56, Allée de la Robertsau were completed by Franz Lütke and Heinrich Backes in Straßburg, German Empire	Palazzo Castiglioni was finished by Giuseppe Sommaruga in Milan	
1904	Saint-Jean-de-Montmartre church was finished by Anatole de Baudot, Pierre Roche, and Alexandre Bigot	Casa Trinxet was built by Josep Puig i Cadafalch in Barcelona	Printed cotton for the Liberty department store was created by Silver Studio	Ainola was finished by Lars Sonck in Järvenpää, Grand Duchy of Finland	Yaroslavsky railway station was completed by Franz (Fyodor) Schechtel, Mikhail Vrubel, and Peter Vaulin in Moscow	
1904	The "Dawn and Dusk" bed and La Main aux algues et aux coquillages were created by Émile Gallé in Nancy	The Casa Laporta was finished by Timoteo Briet Montaud in Alcoy, Valencian Community	Hill House by Charles and Margaret Macdonald Mackintosh was built in Helensburgh	Arnold Böcklin typeface was designed by Otto Weisert	Stained glass window Angel of the Resurrection was created by Louis Comfort Tiffany for First Meridian Heights Presbyterian Church in Indianapolis	
1905	Paul Cauchie built his own house in Brussels	Casa de les Punxes was built by Josep Puig i Cadafalch in Barcelona	The Black Friar pub was remodelled by Herbert Fuller-Clark, Frederick T. Callcott, and Henry Poole in London	Koloman Moser finished the high altar for the Otto Wagner's Kirche am Steinhof and along with Gustav Klimt separated from Vienna Secession	The Casa Malhoa was finished by Manuel Joaquim Norte Júnior in Lissabon	
1905	Paul Cauchie built his own house in Brussels	Casa de les Punxes was built by Josep Puig i Cadafalch in Barcelona	The Black Friar pub was remodelled by Herbert Fuller-Clark, Frederick T. Callcott, and Henry Poole in London	Sanatorium Purkersdorf and Armchair Model 670 "Sitzmaschine" were finished by Josef Hoffmann in Cisleithania	Astoria was built by Herman Hendrik Baanders and Gerrit van Arkel in Amsterdam	
1906	The Magasins Waucquez were finished by Victor Horta in Brussels	Casa Batlló* was completed by Antoni Gaudí, Joan Rubió and Josep Maria Jujol in Barcelona		Hackesche Höfe were completed by August Endell in Berlin	Livraria Lello was finished in Porto	
1906	Havis Amanda was sculpted by Ville Vallgren in Paris (Note: The statue was erected at Market Square, Helsinki in 1908)	The Casa Vilaplana was finished by Vicente Pascual Pastor in Alcoy, Valencian Community		Gresham Palace was completed by Zsigmond Quittner, Miksa Róth, Gyula Jungfer, Eduard Telcs, Miklós Ligeti and Géza Maróti in Budapest	Villa Fallet was completed by René Chapallaz and Charles-Édouard Jeanneret later better known as Le Corbusier in La Chaux-de-Fonds, Switzerland	
1907	Société Générale office was built by Jacques Hermant	The Viaduct of Canalejas was finished by Enrique Vilaplana Juliá in Alcoy, Valencian Community	Scotland Street School was finished by Charles Rennie Mackintosh in Glasgow	The Deutscher Werkbund was founded by Joseph Maria Olbrich, Josef Hoffmann, Peter Behrens, Richard Riemerschmid, Bruno Paul and others in Munich	The Hotel Metropol was completed by William Walcot, Lev Kekushev, Vladimir Shukhov, Mikhail Vrubel, Alexander Golovin, Nikolai Andreev in Moscow	
1907	Société Générale office was built by Jacques Hermant	The Viaduct of Canalejas was finished by Enrique Vilaplana Juliá in Alcoy, Valencian Community	Scotland Street School was finished by Charles Rennie Mackintosh in Glasgow	Swan Pharmacy and 350 other Jugendstil buildings were constructed in Ålesund, Norway	The Hotel Metropol was completed by William Walcot, Lev Kekushev, Vladimir Shukhov, Mikhail Vrubel, Alexander Golovin, Nikolai Andreev in Moscow	
1908		Palau de la Música Catalana* was completed by Lluís Domènech i Montaner, Miguel Blay, Pablo Gargallo, and Antoni Rigalt in Barcelona		Wedding tower was completed by Joseph Maria Olbrich in Darmstadt, German Empire		
1908		The Casa d'Escaló was finished by Vicente Pascual Pastor in Alcoy, Valencian Community		The Kiss and Hope II were finished by Gustav Klimt and presented at Kunstschau 1908 exposition in Vienna		
1909	Interior of Villa Ortiz Basualdo was created by Gustave Serrurier-Bovy in Mar del Plata, Argentina	Vapor Aymerich, Amat i Jover textile factory was built by Lluís Muncunill in Terrassa		The main railway station was completed by Josef Fanta, Václav Jansa, Ladislav Šaloun, and Stanislav Sucharda in Prague	Ballets Russes premiered in Paris	
1909	Interior of Villa Ortiz Basualdo was created by Gustave Serrurier-Bovy in Mar del Plata, Argentina	Bellesguard and Sagrada Família Schools were completed by Antoni Gaudí in Barcelona		The building at Vidus iela, 11 was finished by Konstantīns Pēkšēns in Riga, Baltic governorates of Russian Empire	Major Pessoa Residence was finished by Francisco Augusto da Silva Rocha in Aveiro, Portugal	
1910	Hôtel Lutetia was built by Louis-Charles Boileau and Henri Tauzin in Paris	Casa de Antonio Baena Gómez was finished by Enrique Nieto in Melilla	The building of Glasgow School of Art by Charles Rennie Mackintosh was completely opened	Karuna Church was completed by Josef Stenbäck in Grand Duchy of Finland	"Pond Lily" Table Lamp, Model No. 344 and Jack-in-the-pulpit vase were finished by Louis Comfort Tiffany	
1910	"Meeting d'Aviation Nice" poster was created by Charles-Léonce Brossé	The Casa Briet was finished by Timoteo Briet Montaud in Alcoy, Valencian Community	The building of Glasgow School of Art by Charles Rennie Mackintosh was completely opened	National Museum of Finland was completed by Herman Gesellius, Armas Lindgren, Eliel Saarinen, and Akseli Gallen-Kallela in Helsinki	Crematorium was completed by Robert Belli, Henri Robert, and Charles l’Eplattenier in La Chaux-de-Fonds, Switzerland	
1911	Michelin House was built by François Espinasse in London	Casa Comalat was finished by Salvador Valeri i Pupurull in Barcelona		Sprudelhof spa complex was finished in Bad Nauheim, German Empire	Bolsheokhtinsky Bridge was finished in Saint Petersburg	
1911	Michelin House was built by François Espinasse in London	The Circulo Industrial de Alcoy was finished by Timoteo Briet Montaud in Alcoy, Valencian Community		The Stoclet Palace* was finished by Josef Hoffmann, Gustav Klimt, Fernand Khnopff, Franz Metzner, and Leopold Forstner in Brussels	Bolsheokhtinsky Bridge was finished in Saint Petersburg	
1912	Hector Guimard completed his own house in Paris	Casa Gasull and Institut Pere Mata were finished by Lluís Domènech i Montaner in Reus		Municipal House was completed by Osvald Polívka, Alphonse Mucha, Josef Mařatka and Stanislav Sucharda in Prague	The katholikon of Marfo-Mariinsky Convent was finished by Alexey Shchusev in Moscow	
1912	Hector Guimard completed his own house in Paris	Casa Milà* was completed by Antoni Gaudí and Josep Maria Jujol in Barcelona		Kallio Church was finished by Lars Sonck in Helsinki	Tolstoy House was finished by Fredrik Lidvall in Saint Petersburg	
1913	The last métro station entrances of Hector Guimard were produced in Paris	Episcopal Palace was finished by Antoni Gaudí in Astorga		The Blue Church was finished by Ödön Lechner in Pozsony (now Bratislava)	Galería Güemes was completed by Francisco Gianotti in Buenos Aires	
1913	The last métro station entrances of Hector Guimard were produced in Paris	The building at calle Sant Llorenç 27 was finished by Vicente Pascual Pastor in Alcoy, Valencian Community		Palace of Culture was finished by Marcell Komor, Dezső Jakab, Aladár Körösfői-Kriesch, and Miksa Róth in Marosvásárhely (now Târgu Mureș, Romania)	Galería Güemes was completed by Francisco Gianotti in Buenos Aires	
1914	Agoudas Hakehilos Synagogue was completed by Hector Guimard in Paris	Parc Güell* was completed by Antoni Gaudí, Joan Rubió and Josep Maria Jujol in Barcelona		Lyhdynkantajat were sculpted by Emil Wikström for Helsinki Central Station	La Primavera is painted by Galileo Chini	
1914	Agoudas Hakehilos Synagogue was completed by Hector Guimard in Paris	Church of Colònia Güell* was left unfinished by Antoni Gaudí and Francesc Berenguer i Mestres in Santa Coloma de Cervelló		Eugenia Primavesi was painted by Gustav Klimt in Vienna	La Primavera is painted by Galileo Chini	
1915		Casa Tortosa was finished by Enrique Nieto in Melilla		Jan Hus Memorial was completed by Ladislav Šaloun in Prague		
1916		Casa de Jacinto Ruiz was completed by Emilio Alzugaray in Melilla		Kultaranta was finished by Lars Sonck in Naantali, Grand Duchy of Finland	Dream Garden favrile glass mosaic mural was made by Maxfield Parrish and Louis Comfort Tiffany in Philadelphia	
1916		Mercado de Colón was finished by Francisco Mora Berenguer in Valencia		Kultaranta was finished by Lars Sonck in Naantali, Grand Duchy of Finland	The Palacio Baburizza was finished in Valparaíso, Chile	
1917		Casa de David J. Melul and Grandes Almacenes La Reconquista were finished by Enrique Nieto in Melilla			The office building of the Holland America Lines was completed by Constant Mari Droogleever Fortuijnin and other architects in Rotterdam	
1917		The North Station by Demetrio Ribes Marco was inaugurated in Valencia			The Jack Pine and The West Wind were finished by Tom Thomson in Canada	
1918		Lluís Domènech i Montaner built his own house in Canet de Mar				

== See also ==
- Paris architecture of the Belle Époque
- Art Nouveau architecture in Russia
- Art Nouveau architecture in Riga
- Art Nouveau in Alcoy
- Art Nouveau in Antwerp
- Valencian Art Nouveau
- National Romantic style
- Art Nouveau religious buildings
- Art Nouveau furniture
