= Fernando Cabrera Cantó =

Spanish painter and sculptor (1866-1937)

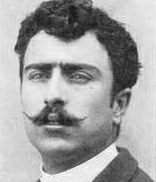
- Born: 8 October 1866; Alcoy, Spain
- Died: 6 January 1937 (aged 70); Alcoy, Spain

Fernando Cabrera Cantó (1866–1937) was a Spanish painter and sculptor; whose themes ranged from the cheerful and satiric to the darkly morbid. He also did landscapes.

== Biography ==
He began his artistic education at the Real Academia de Bellas Artes de San Carlos in Valencia, where his teacher was a fellow Alcoyano, Lorenzo Casanova. He completed his studies in Madrid, with Casto Plasencia, and in Italy; a study trip made possible by a scholarship from the Diputación provincial de Alicante.

He collaborated with the architect, Vicente Pascual Pastor, in decorating the Casa del Pavo, one of the landmarks of Art Nouveau in Alcoy. His studio would later be located in the front part of that building. For much of his life, he was a teacher at the School of Arts and Crafts. His students included Julio Pascual, the noted enamel and iron artist, José Mataix Monllor, Edmundo Jordá and Agustín Espí Carbonell, a decorative artist, .

He participated in the National Exhibition of Fine Arts; receiving a Second Class prize in 1890 for "Huérfanos" (Orphans), and a First Class prize in 1906 for "Al Abismo" (To the Abyss...). He was also the recipient of awards at the Exposition Universelle (1900) and the Panama–Pacific International Exposition of 1915, in San Francisco.

Cantó's works show the influence of several 19th-century painters, notably Mariano Fortuny, Ignacio Pinazo Camarlench and Eduardo Rosales. Many of his paintings express social commentary, while others are simple genre scenes, landscapes and portraits.

== Selected paintings ==
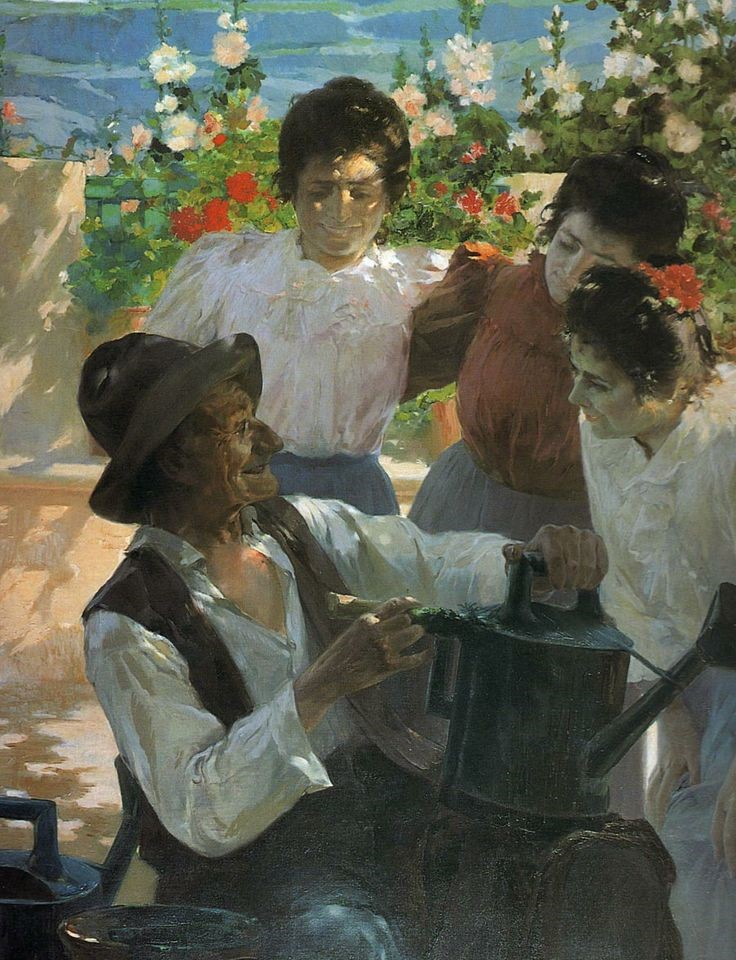
Scene in a Garden
(Do You Need a Model?)

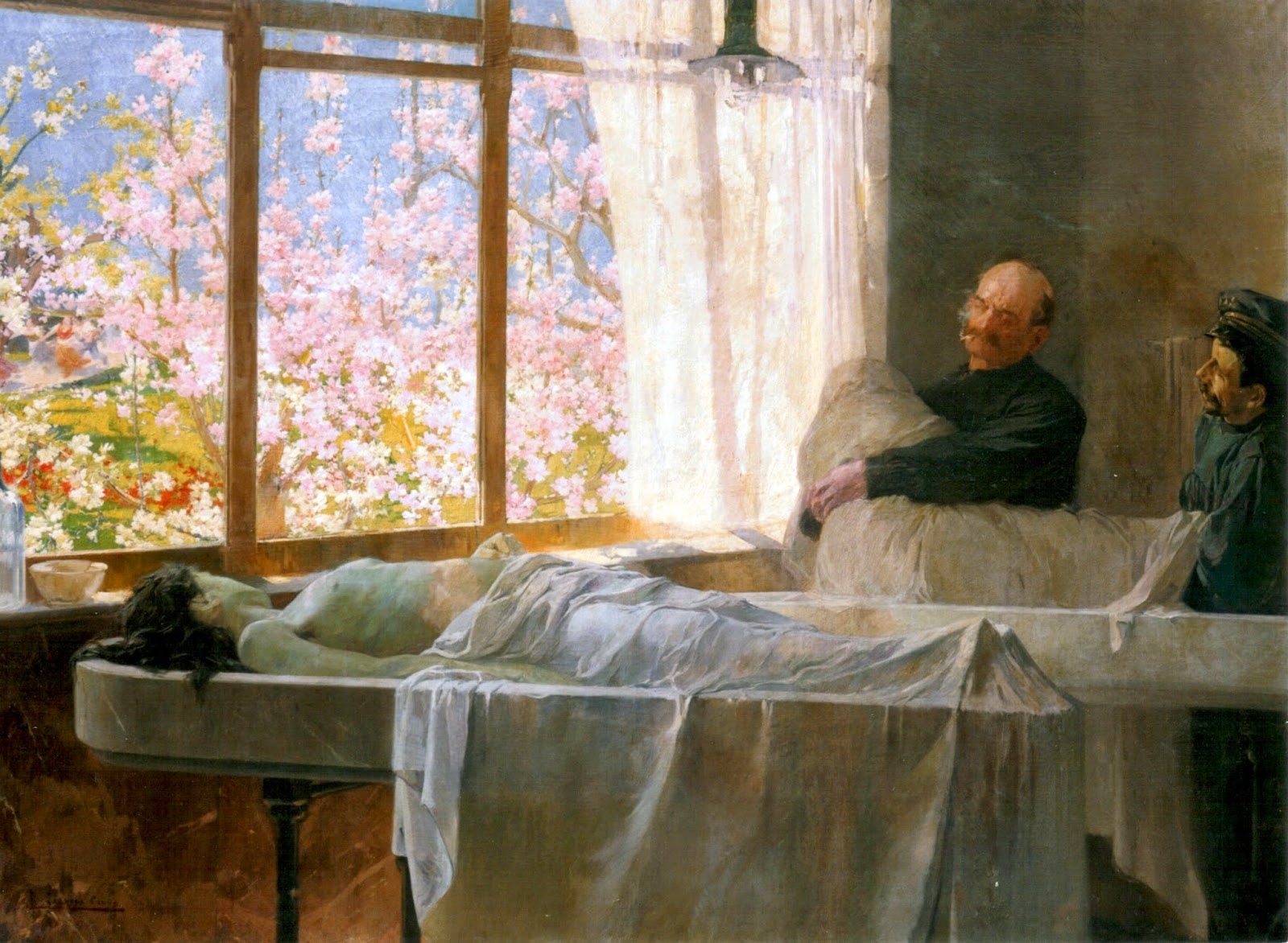
Mors in Vita

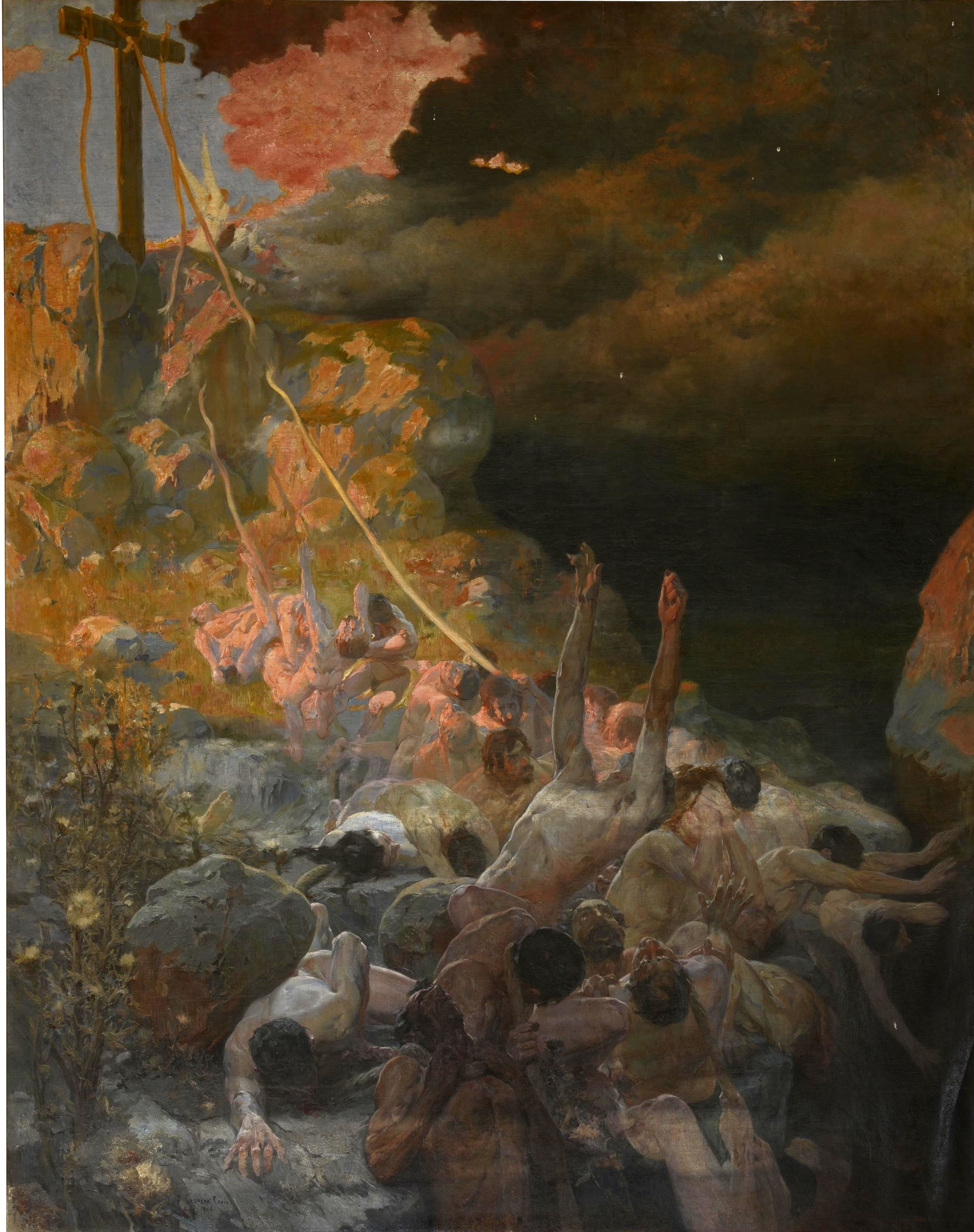
To the Abyss...

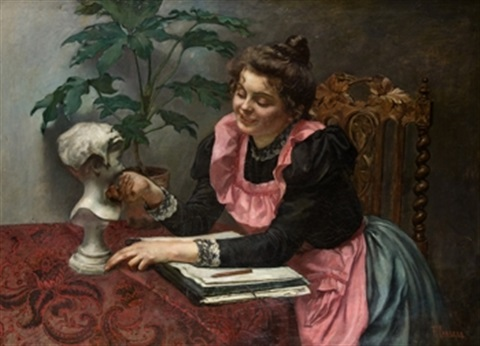
The Caress

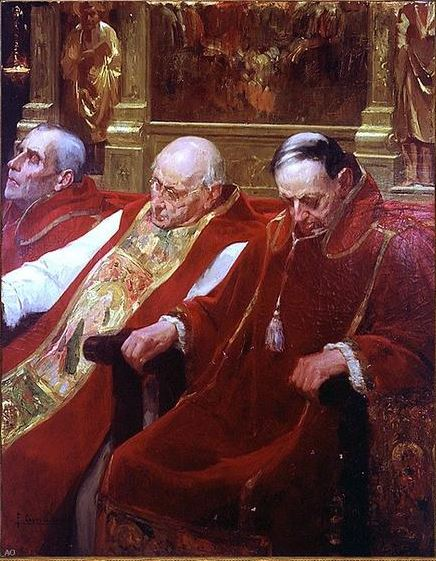
The Soporific Sermon
