= Timoteo Briet Montaud =

19th and 20th century Spanish architect

- Born: 1859; Cocentaina (Alicante)
- Died: 1925 (aged 65–66); Alcoy (Alicante)
- Known for: Architecture

Timoteo Briet Montaud (Cocentaina, March 3, 1859 – Alcoy, January 30, 1925) was a Spanish architect, one of the main architects of the Art Nouveau in Alcoy and the Valencian Art Nouveau.

== Biography ==
In 1876 he finishes his studies in Alcoy's Industrial Elementary School. Between 1882 and 1883 he ends his studies in the Barcelona Official School of Fine arts. In 1890 finishes the architect's career in the Barcelona School of Architecture.

In 1893 Timoteo Briet marries with Maria Valor Boronat. In 1902 he is nominated municipal architect of Alcoy, by public contest.

The Timoteo Briet's Art Nouveau style will be contained, rather formally and especially with a great influence of the Austrian Art Nouveau movement Secession, influence that it is present in all his Art Nouveau works. Along his career he realized more than 40 works and architectural interventions, practically all of them in Alcoy. He die in 1925, in Alcoy.

== Works ==
Relation of works by chronological order:

- Iglesia del convento de las Carmelitas en calle El Camí número 42, in Alcoy. (1891).
- Station for Ferrocarriles de Villena a Alcoy y Yecla company, in Bocairent (Alicante). (1892).
- Capilla de la Comunión, in Banyeres de Mariola (Alicante). (1897).
- Fábrica "El Vulcano" en calle Els Alçamora 17–19, in Alcoy. (1899).
- Casa en calle Sant Nicolau 32, in Alcoy. (1901).
- Convento e iglesia de las Siervas de María en la calle Cordeta número 12, in Alcoy. (1904).
- Casa Laporta, in Alcoy (1904).
- Cocheras en plaza Emili Sala 12, in Alcoy. (1905).
- Viviendas en calle Bartolomé José Gallardo 1, 3 y 5, in Alcoy. (1905).
- Taller de la estación, in Banyeres de Mariola (Alicante). Obra realizada para el industrial alcoyano José Laporta Valor. (1905).
- Edificio en calle Sant Nicolau número 25, in Alcoy (1907).
- Casa en calle El Camí número 1, en Alcoy (1907).
- Building at 35 Sant Nicolau street, in Alcoy (1908).
- Building at 26 Sant Josep street, in Alcoy. (1908).
- Building in 20, Pintor Casanova Street, in Alcoy. (1908).
- Fachada y salón del Circulo Industrial de Alcoy. (1909–1911).
- Taller de carruajes en calle Agres número 5, in Alcoy. (1909).
- Casa Briet, in 24 Sant Josep Street, in Alcoy. (1910).
- Casa particular en esquina de la calle Casablanca, in Alcoy (1910).
- Edificio en la calle Sant Llorenç número 3, in Alcoy. (1910).
- House of Francisco Masanet in Agres Street number 3, in Alcoy (1910).
- Subestación de Hidroeléctrica de Alcoy (1910).
- Pantheon of Vilaplana Gisbert in the Alcoy Cemetery, (1910).
- House at 9 Capellà Belloch street, in Alcoy. (1910–1911).
- Chalet junto a la subestación de Hidroeléctrica en la calle Colón número 3, en Alcoy. (1911).
- Municipal staghterhouse of Alcoy (1911).
- House at 17 País Valencià avenue, ei Alcoy. (1913).
- Saint George's church, in Alcoy (1913).
- Casa en calle Joan Cantó número 6, in Alcoy. (1914).
- Fábrica de "El Rosendo" en calle Sant Vicent Ferrer número 14, in Alcoy. (1914).
- Ermita en el Molí Sol, en Banyeres (Alicante). (1914). Actualmente ubicada en el cementerio de Banyeres.
- Fábricas en calle Sant Joan números 43 y 45, in Alcoy. (1915).
- Casa y fábrica en calle Sant Vicent Ferrer número 12, in Alcoy (1915).
- Viviendas en calle Pintor Casanova números 16 y 18, in Alcoy. (1915).
- House at 22 Gonçal Cantó square, in Alcoy (1918).
- House at 21 Sant Tomàs street, in Alcoy (1918).
- House at 11 Mossen Torregrosa street, in Alcoy (1919).
- Edificio en calle Sant Nicolau número 44, in Alcoy (1920).
- Edificio en avenida del País Valencià número 14, in Alcoy. (1921).
- Reforma de edificio en la plaza de España número 17, in Alcoy. (1924).

== Bibliography ==
- Doménech Romá, Jorge (2010). Modernismo en Alcoy, su contexto histórico y los oficios artesanales. Editorial Aguaclara. pp. 293–294. ISBN 978-84-613-8233-0.
- Doménech Romá, Jorge (2013). Del Modernismo al Funcionalismo, características y evolución del movimiento modernista, el modernismo en Alcoy y Novelda (casos concretos). Publicaciones de la Universidad de Alicante. p. 224. ISBN 978-84-9717-267-7.
- Jaén i Urban, Gaspar (1999). Instituto de Cultura Juan Gil-Albert, Colegio Territorial de Arquitectos de Alicante, ed. Guía de arquitectura de la provincia de Alicante. p. 14. ISBN 84-7784-353-8.
