= Casa del Pavo =

Coordinates: 38°41′49″N 0°28′23″W

- Casa del Pavo (Spanish)
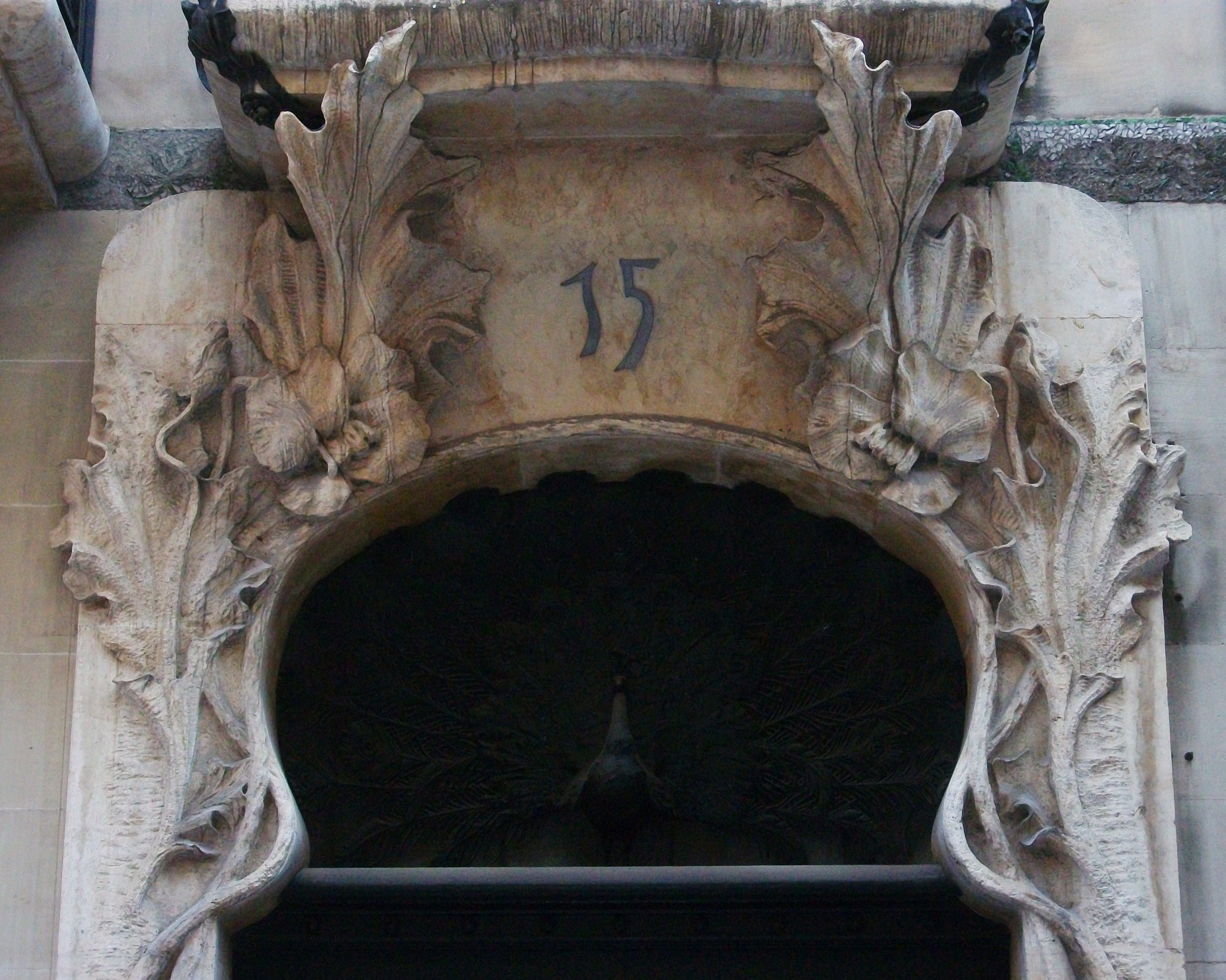
- Interactive map of Casa del Pavo
- Location: 15, Sant Nicolau St. Alcoy (Alicante), Valencian Community, Spain

History
- Built: 1909

Site notes
- Architect: Vicente Pascual Pastor
- Architectural style: Valencian Art Nouveau

Spanish Cultural Heritage
- Type: Non-movable
- Criteria: Monument

The Casa del Pavo (Peacock House) is a private building at 15 Sant Nicolau Street, in the city center of Alcoy (Alicante), Valencian Community, Spain. It is one of the main works of the Art Nouveau in Alcoy.

== Building ==
The building was designed by the Valencian architect Vicente Pascual Pastor in 1909. It is a clear example of Valencian Art Nouveau architecture of the early twentieth century. The is named for the iron sculptures of peacocks that flank the main door.

It is a private residential building of five floors, in whose back part was located the study of the painter Fernando Cabrera Cantó, who collaborated with the architect Vicente Pascual Pastor in the ornamentation and decoration of the building.

== See also ==
- Art Nouveau in Alcoy

== Bibliography ==
- Doménech Romá, Jorge (2010). Modernismo en Alcoy, su contexto histórico y los oficios artesanales. Editorial Aguaclara. pp. 367–390. ISBN 978-84-613-8233-0.
- Jaén i Urban, Gaspar (1999). Instituto de Cultura Juan Gil-Albert, Colegio Territorial de Arquitectos de Alicante, ed. Guía de arquitectura de la provincia de Alicante. p. 14. ISBN 84-7784-353-8.
- Colomer Sendra, Vicente (2002). Colegio Oficial de Arquitectos de la Comunidad Valenciana, ed. Registro de Arquitectura del Siglo XX en la Comunidad Valenciana (en castellano/valenciano). p. 719. ISBN 84-87233-38-4.
