= Casa d'Escaló =

Coordinates: 38°41′44.2″N 0°28′36.8″W

- Casa d'Escaló (Spanish)
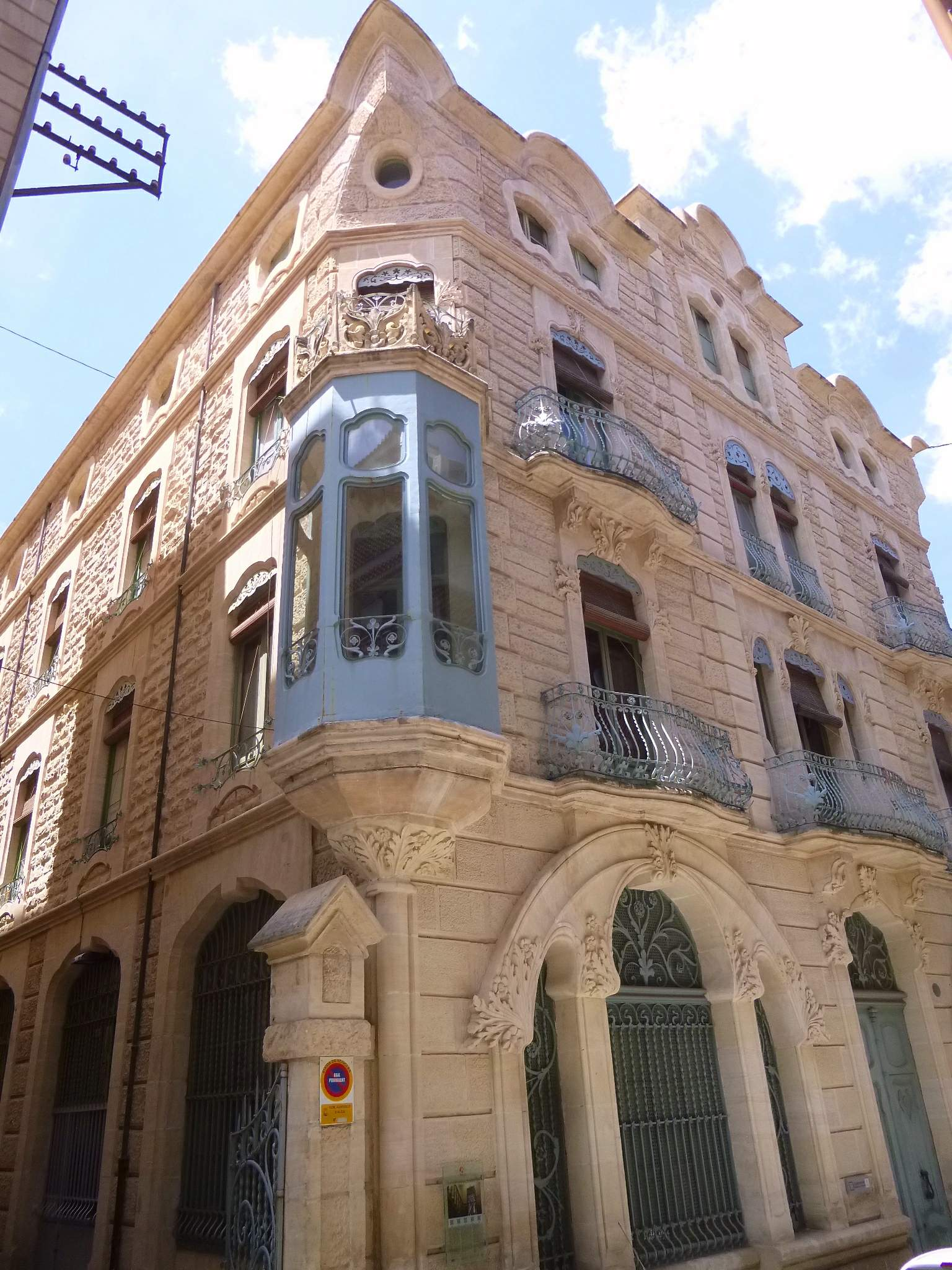
- Interactive map of Casa d'Escaló
- Location: 2, Joan Cantó St. Alcoy (Alicante), Valencian Community, Spain

History
- Built: 1906–1908

Site notes
- Architect: Vicente Pascual Pastor
- Architectural style: Valencian Art Nouveau

Spanish Cultural Heritage
- Type: Non-movable
- Criteria: Monument

The Casa d'Escaló (Escaló house) is a public building at 2 Joan Cantó street, in the city center of Alcoy (Alicante), Valencian Community, Spain. It is one of the main works of the Art Nouveau in Alcoy.

== Building ==
The building was designed by the Valencian architect Vicente Pascual Pastor in 1906 and finished in 1908. It is a clear example of Valencian Art Nouveau architecture of the early twentieth century. The building is popularly known as Escaló house. The textile manufacturer from Alcoy Enrique García Peidro, known with the nickname of Escaló (step) promoted the building to shelter his residence. He was proprietary together with his brothers of the textile factory Hijos de Salvador García, more known popularly as the Escaló's factory.

It is a public building of three floors. It was rehabilitated in the decade of 1980 to shelter the Municipal Conservatoire of Music and Dance "Joan Cantó", in honor to the musician and composer from Alcoy, Joan Cantó Francés.

== See also ==
- Art Nouveau in Alcoy

== Bibliography ==
- Doménech Romá, Jorge (2010). Modernismo en Alcoy, su contexto histórico y los oficios artesanales. Editorial Aguaclara. pp. 327–350. ISBN 978-84-613-8233-0.
- Jaén i Urban, Gaspar (1999). Instituto de Cultura Juan Gil-Albert, Colegio Territorial de Arquitectos de Alicante, ed. Guía de arquitectura de la provincia de Alicante. p. 14. ISBN 84-7784-353-8.
