= Circulo Industrial de Alcoy =

Coordinates: 38°41′48.1″N 0°28′23.2″W

- Círculo Industrial de Alcoy (Spanish)
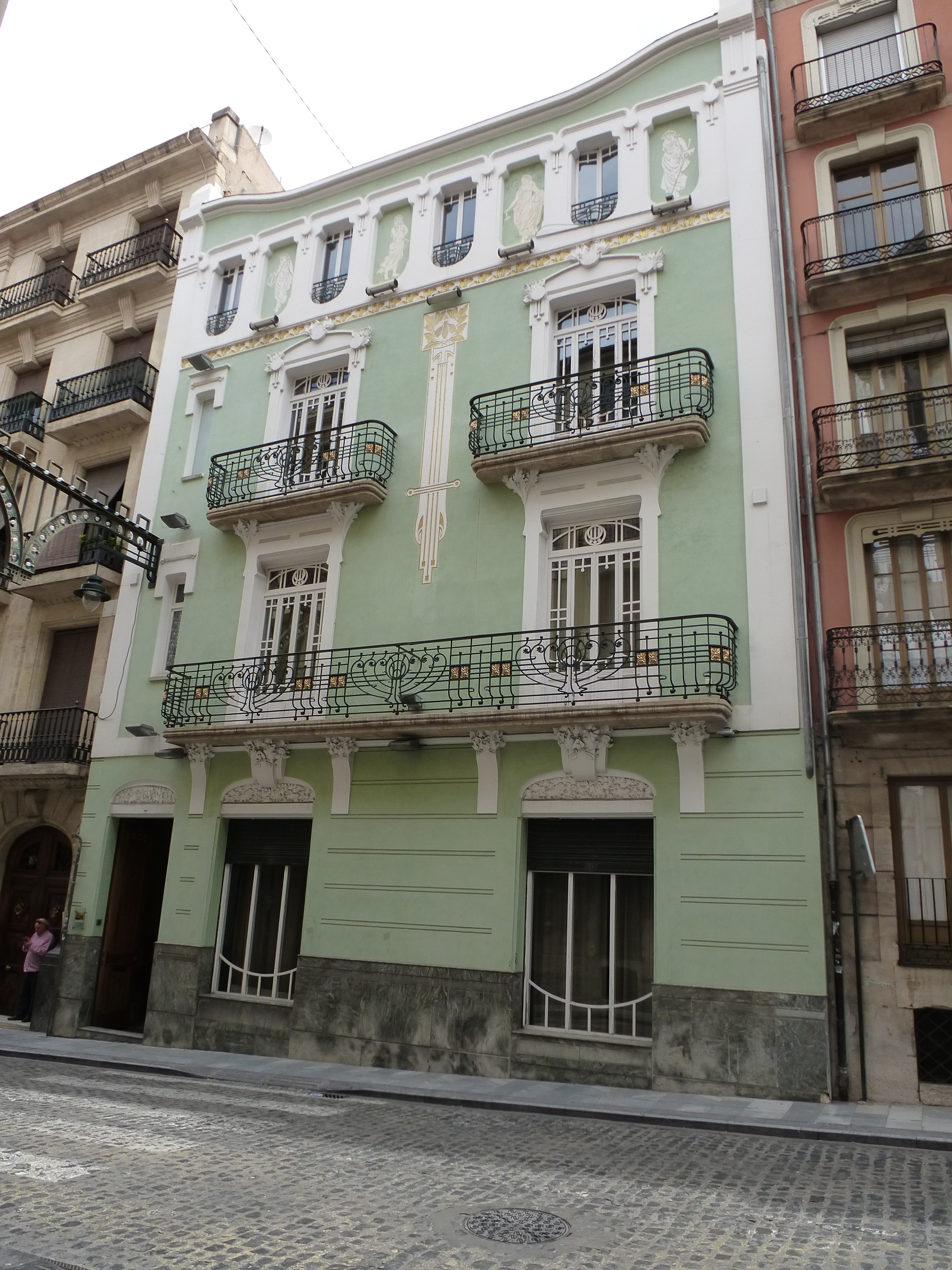
- Interactive map of Circulo Industrial de Alcoy
- Location: 19, Sant Nicolau St. Alcoy (Alicante), Valencian Community, Spain

History
- Built: 1909–1911

Site notes
- Architect: Timoteo Briet Montaud
- Architectural style: Valencian Art Nouveau

Spanish Cultural Heritage
- Type: Non-movable
- Criteria: Monument

The Circulo Industrial de Alcoy (Alcoy's Industrial Circle) is a cultural institution from Alcoy (Alicante), Valencian Community, Spain, founded on January 1, 1868. It is placed at 19 Sant Nicolau street, in the city center of Alcoy.

His creation had as aim to create an entity that was using as link and point of meeting of the businessmen, entrepreneurs and the Alcoy's middle class. Also, from his beginnings it developed sociocultural aims and activities. The history of Alcoy's Industrial Circle is a faithful reflection of Alcoy's economic and industrial history.

== Building ==
The building was designed by the Valencian architect Timoteo Briet Montaud in 1909–1911. The building is one of the most representative works of the Art Nouveau in Alcoy. It is one of the most singular and better preserved Art Nouveau works of Alcoy, both in his exterior and in his elegant interior spaces. It has the characteristics of the architectural Art Nouveau movement Secession.

It has the cataloguing of protected with the level the IInd of Integral Protection in the General Plan, beside being inventoried by Fine arts and the Architects' Official College of the Valencian Community.

== See also ==
- Art Nouveau in Alcoy

== Bibliography ==
- Doménech Romá, Jorge (2010). Modernismo en Alcoy, su contexto histórico y los oficios artesanales. Editorial Aguaclara. pp. 409–420. ISBN 978-84-613-8233-0.
- Jaén i Urban, Gaspar (1999). Instituto de Cultura Juan Gil-Albert, Colegio Territorial de Arquitectos de Alicante, ed. Guía de arquitectura de la provincia de Alicante. p. 15. ISBN 84-7784-353-8.
