= Vicente Pascual Pastor =

Spanish architect (1865–1941)

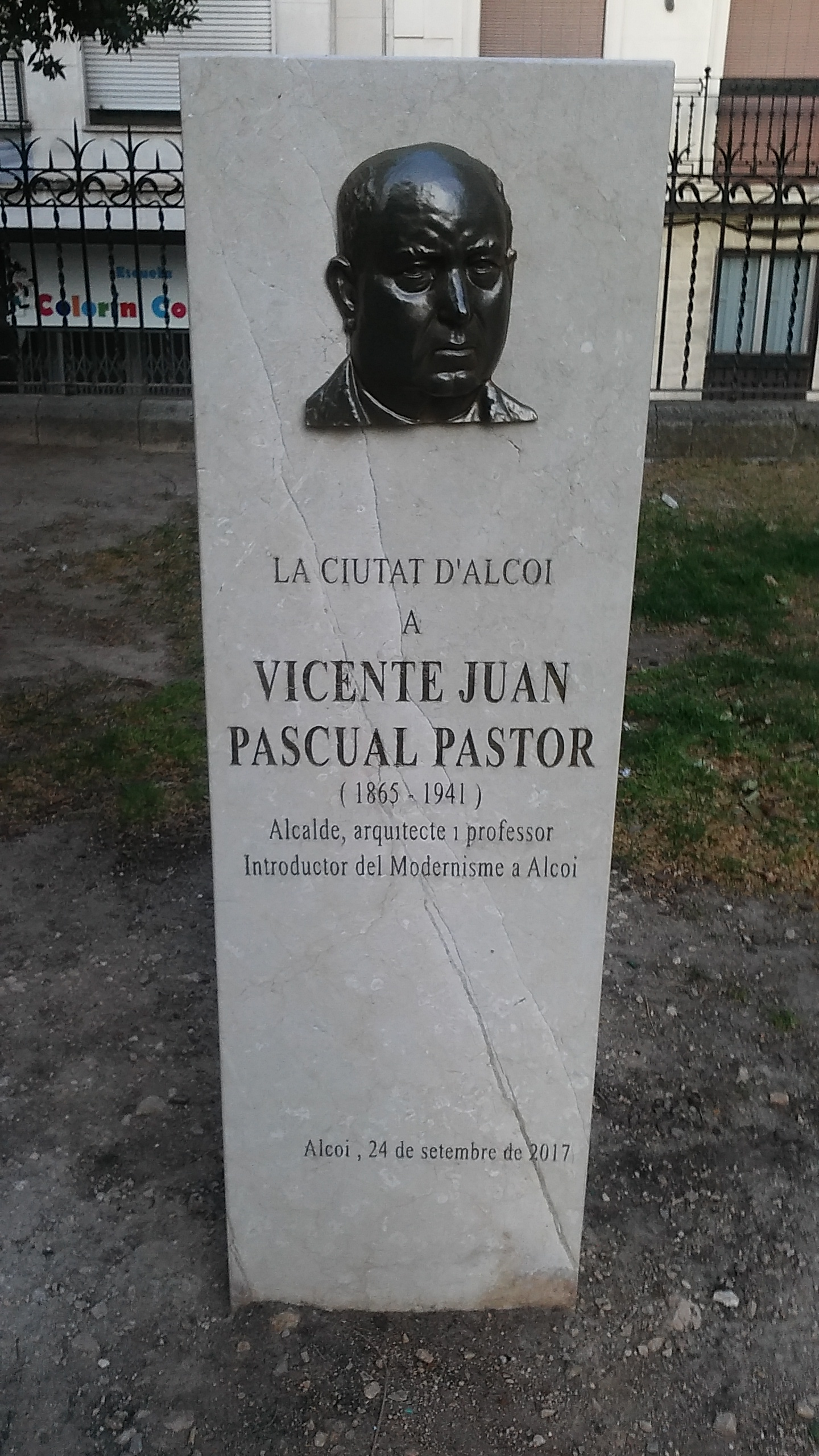
- Monolit Vicent Pascual Pastor
- Born: 1865; Alcoy (Alicante)
- Died: 1941 (aged 75–76); Alcoy (Alicante)
- Known for: Architecture

Vicente Juan Pascual Pastor (Alcoy, June 3, 1865 – Alcoy, February 2, 1941) was a Spanish architect, one of the main architects of the Art Nouveau in Alcoy and the Valencian Art Nouveau.

== Biography ==
Vicente Pascual Pastor was formed in the Barcelona School of Architecture and again in his natal city, in 1891 he becomes municipal architect of Alcoy. He alternates this work with the teaching in the School of Arts and Alcoy's Trades, of which he will be the director in 1903.

Between 1909 and 1913 he becomes mayor of the Alcoy town hall. As a mayor he stimulated the construction of houses for workers in modern and healthy conditions. Inside the social and industrial life of the city, he was present in Alcoy's Savings Bank and in the institution Alcoy's Industrial Circle. He married in 1916 with Elena Perez, who had descent.

The Art Nouveau style of Vicente Pascual will have a few exuberant characteristics and a direct influence of the French and Belgian art nouveau.

The great majority of the projects realized by Vicente Pascual were built in Alcoy, being more than 60 the works that he realized along his life. He realized also some interesting works in Bocairent (Valencia) and Banyeres de Mariola (Alicante).

== Works ==
Relation of works by chronological order:

- Reforma de la Real Fábrica de Paños de Alcoy or casa de la Bolla, (1890).
- Gruta del Círculo Industrial de Alcoy, (1896).
- Glorieta de Alcoy, reforma del parque, (1899).
- Masía La Carrasca, in Agres (Alicante), (1900).
- Edificio en calle Sant Nicolau número 11, in Alcoy, (1901).
- Edificio en la Plaza de España número 7, in Alcoy, (1901).
- Hospicio en Bocairent (Valencia), (1901).
- Casa de José María Belda Belda, in Bocairent (Valencia), (1901).
- Masía Foyeta in Bocairent (Valencia), (1901).
- Masía Regadiu in Bocairent (Valencia), (1901).
- Masía Vilars in Bocairent (Valencia), (1901).
- Convento de las Agustinas in Bocairent, (1901).
- Grupo de casas obreras en el Passeig del Viaducte números 7 y 9, in Alcoy, (1902).
- Casa de la Nueva Balsa (familia Belda), in Banyeres de Mariola (Alicante), (1902).
- Pantheon of Agustín Gisbert in the Alcoy Cemetery, (1903).
- Pantheon of Anselmo Aracil in the Alcoy Cemetery, (1903). Historic eclectic style.
- Fábrica en calle Agres 8, in Alcoy. (1904–1913).
- Edificio en calle Sant Nicolau 29 de Alcoy, (1905).
- Casa Vilaplana. (1906).
- Casa d'Escaló.(1906–1908).
- Casa Mataix. (1907).
- Casa del Pavo. (1908–1909).
- Chalé "El Parque" en la esquina de calle Oliver con calle Isabel II, in Alcoy, (1908).
- Fábrica y vivienda del industrial Francisco Rodes Masanet, en calle Agres número 3, in Alcoy, (1908).
- Fábrica de Carbonell, in Alcoy. (Campus of Alcoy), (1909–1917).
- Fábrica de Federico Tort en la esquina de la calle Oliver con calle Isabel II, en Alcoy, (1909–1920).
- Edificio en calle Sant Llorenç 5, en Alcoy, (1910).
- Edificio en calle Sant Nicolau número 4, en Alcoy, (1910).
- Monte de Piedad y Caja de Ahorros de Alcoy. (1908–1910).
- Pantheon of Salvador García Botí (Escaló) in the Alcoy Cemetery. (1911).
- Chalet de Carlos Pérez "El Teix" en avenida de L'Alameda número 56, en Alcoy, (1912).
- Edificio en calle Sant Llorenç número 27, en Alcoy, (1913).
- Iglesia de San Roque y San Sebastián, en Alcoy, (1914).
- Edificio del Parque de Bomberos, in Alcoy. (1914).
- Fábrica de Mataix en la esquina de la calle Echegaray con la calle Verge dels Lliris, in Alcoy, (1918).
- Casa y fábrica en calle Vistabella números 14 y 18, in Alcoy, (1919).
- Fábrica de Rafael Monllor en la calle Oliver números 4, 6 y 8, in Alcoy. (1920).
- Fábrica de Terol Monllor en la plaza Gonçal Cantó, in Alcoy, (1920).
- Fábrica de Hilados y Tejidos del industrial Bernabeu en la calle Alcolecha número 4, in Alcoy, (1920).
- Fábrica en Passeig del Viaducte número 26, in Alcoy, (1920).
- Edificio de sindicato en la calle Sant Joan de Ribera número 1, in Alcoy, (1921).
- Fábrica de Ferrándiz, in Alcoy. Campus of Alcoy, (1922).
- Fábrica en la calle Agres número 4, en Alcoy, (1922).
- Fábrica de gaseosa "La Bohemia" en la calle Na Saurina d'Entença número 11, en Alcoy, (1922).
- Fábrica en calle Sant Joan de Ribera número 6, en Alcoy, (1922).
- Edificio en calle Sant Nicolau número 46, en Alcoy, (1924).
- Grupo Escolar Cervantes, en Alcoy, (1925).
- Edificio en calle Rigoberto Albors número 7, en Alcoy, (1925).
- Recinto de religiosas in the Alcoy Cemetery, (1925).
- Edificio en la calle Sant Tomás número 23, en Alcoy, (1926).
- Fundición de Vicente Miró en la calle Quevedo, en Alcoy, (1926).
- Reforma de edificio de la Unión Alcoyana en la plaza de España número 21, en Alcoy, (1928).
- Edificio en avenida L'Alameda número 59 para Pedro Zamora, en Alcoy, (1931).

== Bibliography ==
- Doménech Romá, Jorge (2010). Modernismo en Alcoy, su contexto histórico y los oficios artesanales. Editorial Aguaclara. pp. 295–296. ISBN 978-84-613-8233-0.
- Doménech Romá, Jorge (2013). Del Modernismo al Funcionalismo, características y evolución del movimiento modernista, el modernismo en Alcoy y Novelda (casos concretos). Publicaciones de la Universidad de Alicante. p. 224. ISBN 978-84-9717-267-7.
- Charron, Jacqueline (2009). Grafixman, ed. Alcoy contado por sus piedras y vida de Vicente Pascual. Cocentaina. ISBN 978-84-613-7040-5.
- Jaén i Urban, Gaspar (1999). Instituto de Cultura Juan Gil-Albert, Colegio Territorial de Arquitectos de Alicante, ed. Guía de arquitectura de la provincia de Alicante. p. 14. ISBN 84-7784-353-8.
