= Casa Laporta =

Coordinates: 38°41′49.2″N 0°28′34.0″W

- Casa Laporta (Spanish)
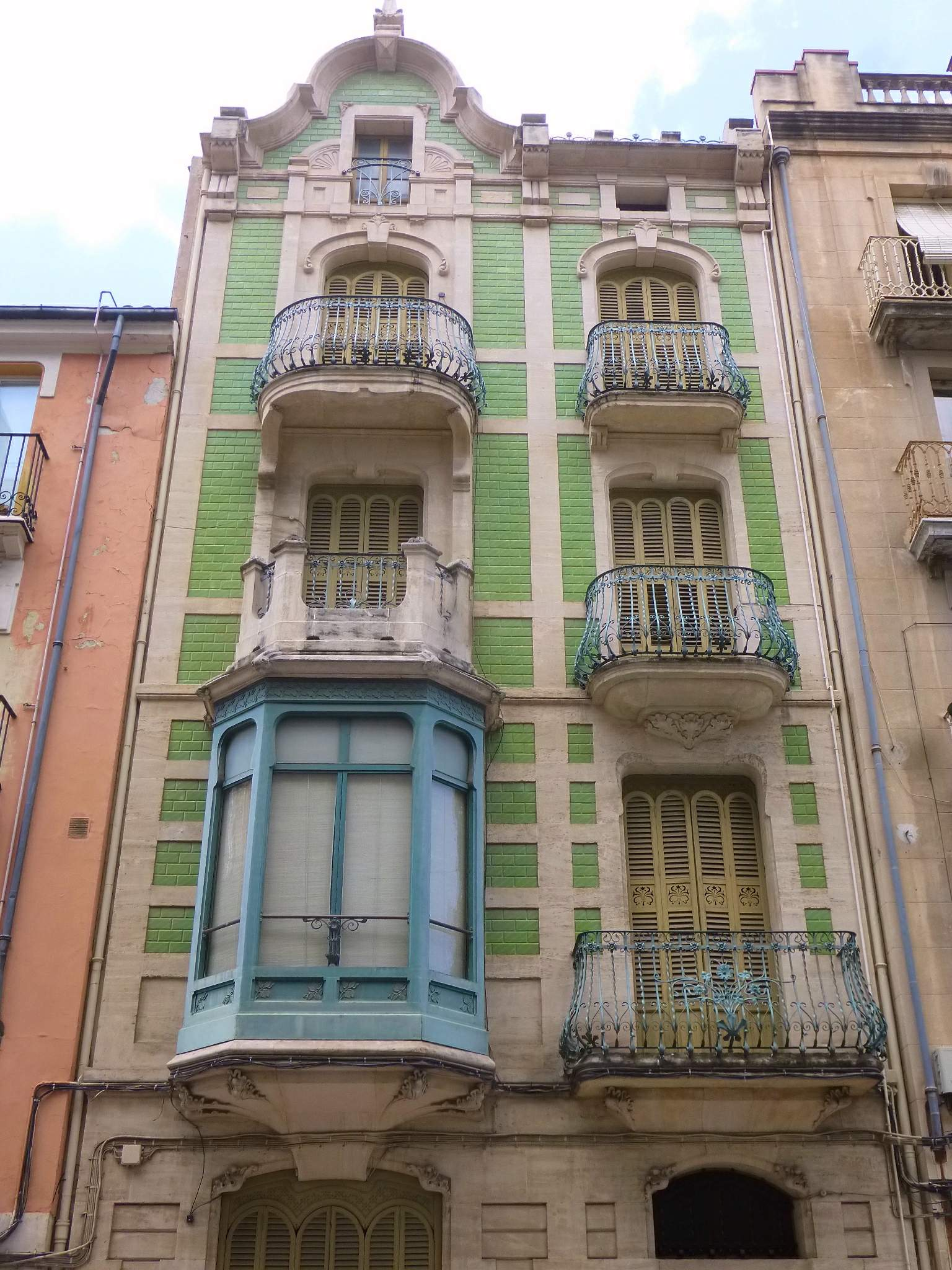
- Interactive map of Casa Laporta
- Location: 26, País Valencià Avenue Alcoy (Alicante), Valencian Community, Spain

History
- Built: 1904

Site notes
- Architect: Timoteo Briet Montaud
- Architectural style: Valencian Art Nouveau

Spanish Cultural Heritage
- Type: Non-movable
- Criteria: Monument

The Casa Laporta (Laporta house) is a private building at 26 País Valencià avenue, in the city center of Alcoy (Alicante), Valencian Community, Spain. It is one of the main works of the Art Nouveau in Alcoy.

== Building ==
The building was designed by the Valencian architect Timoteo Briet Montaud in 1904. It is a clear example of Valencian Art Nouveau architecture of the early twentieth century. It is considered by the experts as the first work of Art Nouveau trend in Alcoy. For this reason, it would be the building that introduced the Art Nouveau style in the city.

The promoter and owner of the building was José Laporta Valor. He was brother of the Valencian painter Francisco Laporta Valor, one of the artists that introduced in Alcoy the Art Nouveau movement.

It is a private residential building of small size, with semibasement, mezzanine, three floors and garret. The interior of the building was decorated with Art Nouveau wall paintings, which must be restored.

In the building located in 30, Pais Valencià, in the same avenue, repeats itself the symmetrical form the distribution of this Timoteo Briet's front. In this case the house was projected by Jorge Vilaplana Carbonell, a master builder of eclectic style, in 1911.

In the back part of Casa Laporta we find an attached garage placed in 12, Emili Sala square, which was built in 1905 by the same architect, one year after the construction of Casa Laporta. His style is also the Art Nouveau.

== See also ==
- Art Nouveau in Alcoy

== Bibliography ==
- Doménech Romá, Jorge (2010). Modernismo en Alcoy, su contexto histórico y los oficios artesanales. Editorial Aguaclara. pp. 301–311. ISBN 978-84-613-8233-0.
