= Casa Vilaplana =

Coordinates: 38°41′43″N 0°28′36″W

- Casa Vilaplana (Spanish)
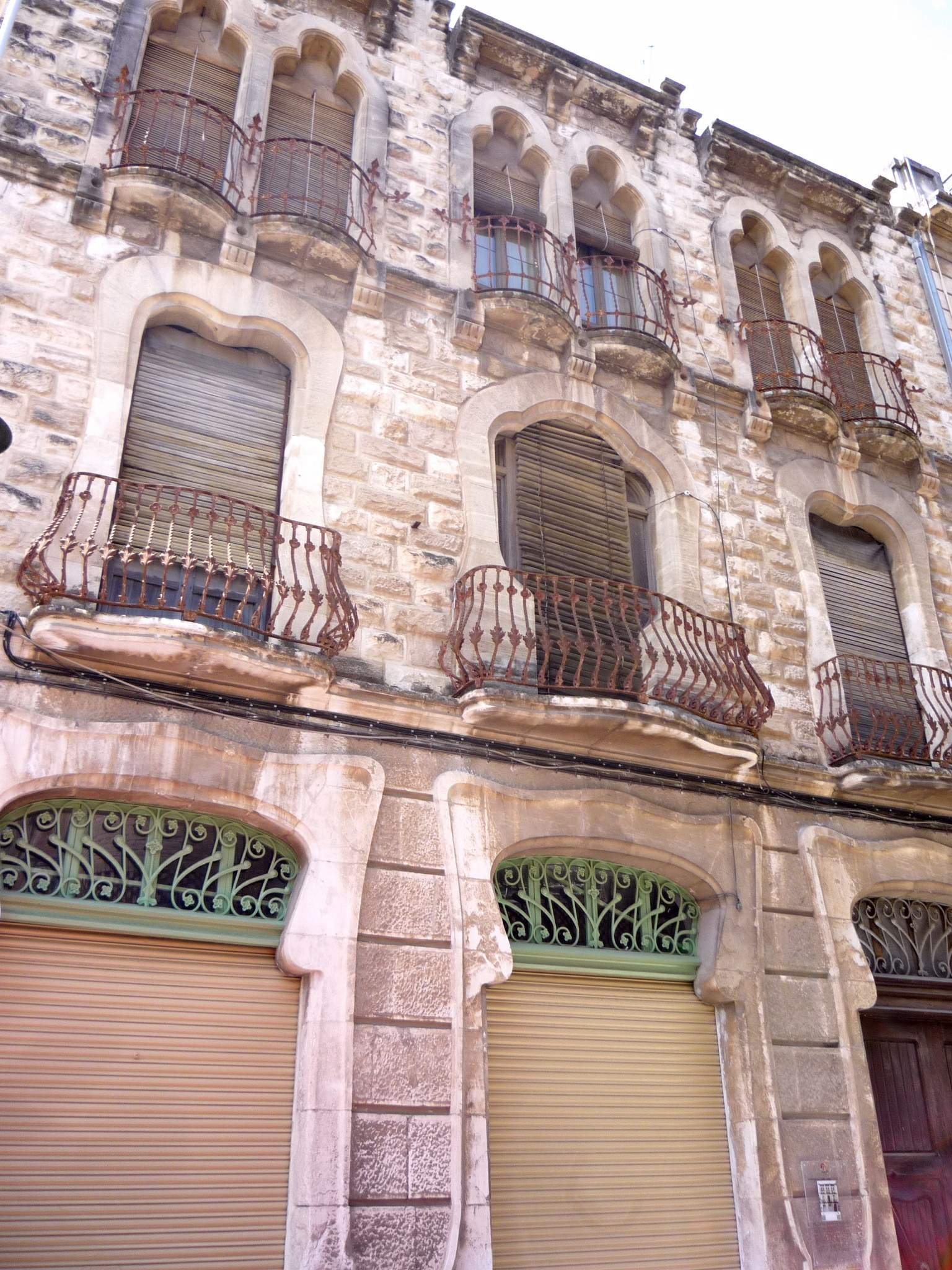
- Interactive map of Casa Vilaplana
- Location: 8, Joan Cantó St. Alcoy (Alicante), Valencian Community, Spain

History
- Built: 1906

Site notes
- Architect: Vicente Pascual Pastor
- Architectural style: Valencian Art Nouveau

Spanish Cultural Heritage
- Type: Non-movable

The Casa Vilaplana (Vilaplana house) is a private building at 8 Joan Cantó street in the city center of Alcoy (Alicante), Valencian Community, Spain.

== Building ==
The building was designed by the Valencian architect Vicente Pascual Pastor in 1906. It is an example of Valencian Art Nouveau architecture of the early twentieth century.

It was commissioned by Enrique Vilaplana Juliá, president of the Alcoy's Savings bank, for his private residence. In the proximities it got up with posteriority realized by the same architect, the headquarters of the banking entity.

The entire facade is made of masonry with a very singular design. The building has two floors.

== See also ==
- Art Nouveau in Alcoy

== Bibliography ==
- Doménech Romá, Jorge (2010). Modernismo en Alcoy, su contexto histórico y los oficios artesanales. Editorial Aguaclara. pp. 319–326. ISBN 978-84-613-8233-0.
