= Casa Briet =

Coordinates: 38°41′48″N 0°28′30″W

- Casa Briet (Spanish)
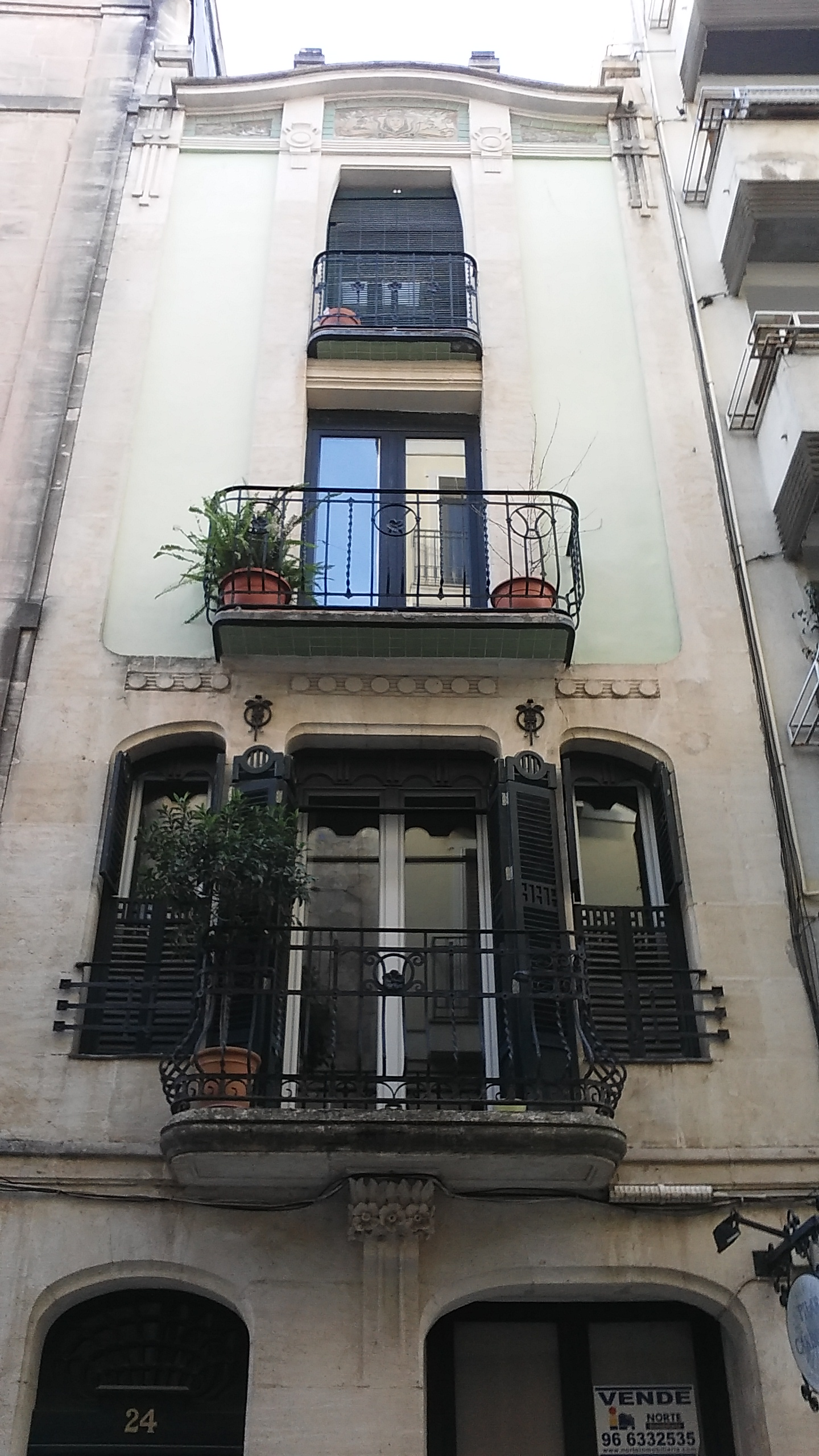
- Interactive map of Casa Briet
- Location: 24, Sant Josep St. Alcoy (Alicante), Valencian Community, Spain

History
- Built: 1910
- Built for: Timoteo Briet Montaud

Site notes
- Architect: Timoteo Briet Montaud
- Architectural style: Valencian Art Nouveau

Spanish Cultural Heritage
- Type: Non-movable

The Casa Briet (Briet house) is a private building at 24 Sant Josep Street, in the city center of Alcoy (Alicante), Valencian Community, Spain.

== Building ==
The building was designed by the Valencian architect Timoteo Briet Montaud in 1910 for his own family home. It is a clear example of Valencian Art Nouveau architecture of the early twentieth century.

The promoter and owner of the building was Timoteo Briet Montaud. It is a private residential building of small size, with ground floor, mezzanine and three floors.

Stands out the utilization of the stone, the floral decoration and the ornamental details, influence of the Secession Art Nouveau movement.

== See also ==
- Art Nouveau in Alcoy

== Bibliography ==
- Doménech Romá, Jorge (2010). Modernismo en Alcoy, su contexto histórico y los oficios artesanales. Editorial Aguaclara. pp. 421–428. ISBN 978-84-613-8233-0.
