= Art Nouveau in Alcoy =

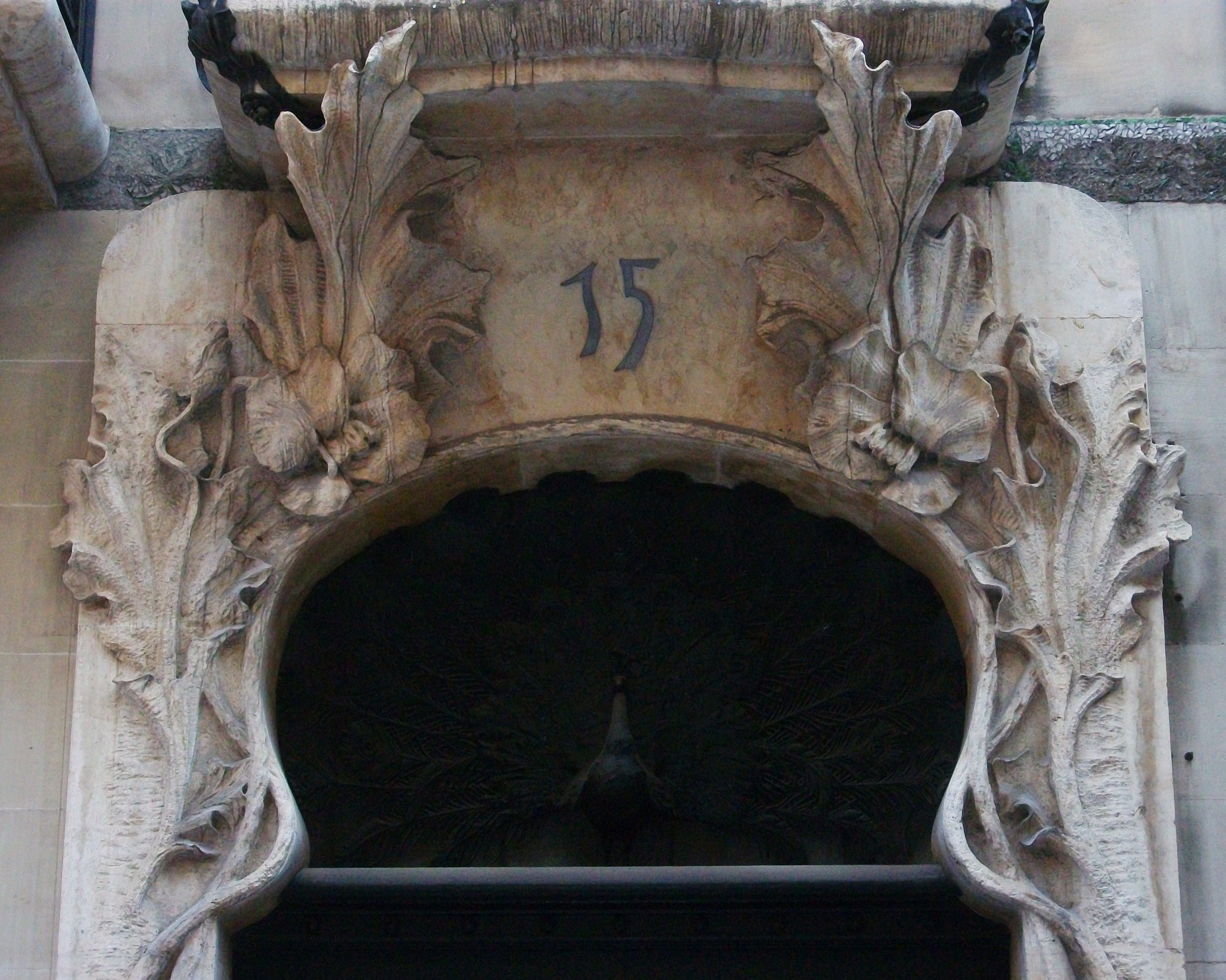
Casa del Pavo (Peacock house), work of Vicente Pascual Pastor

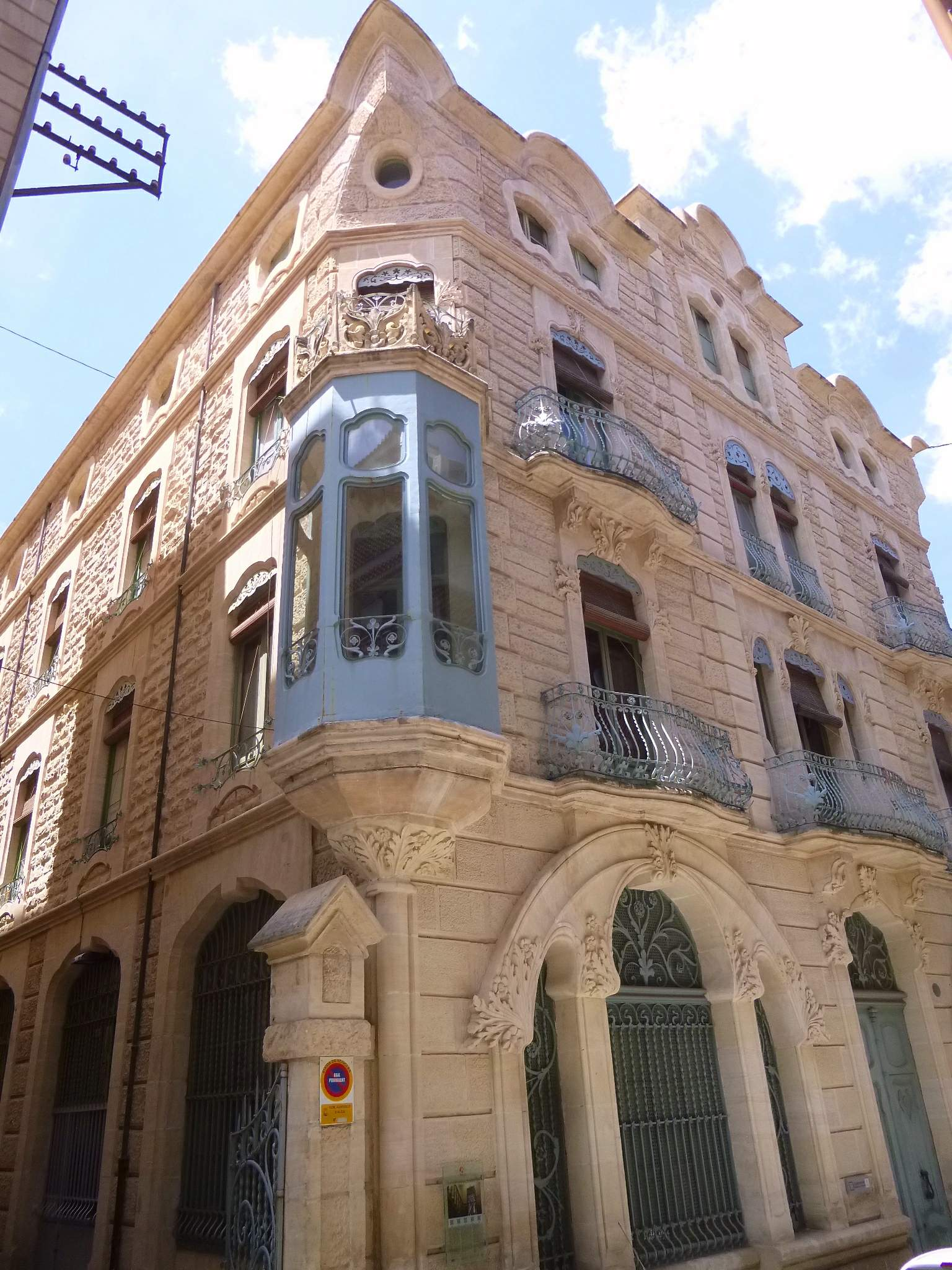
Casa d'Escaló (Escaló house), work of Vicente Pascual Pastor

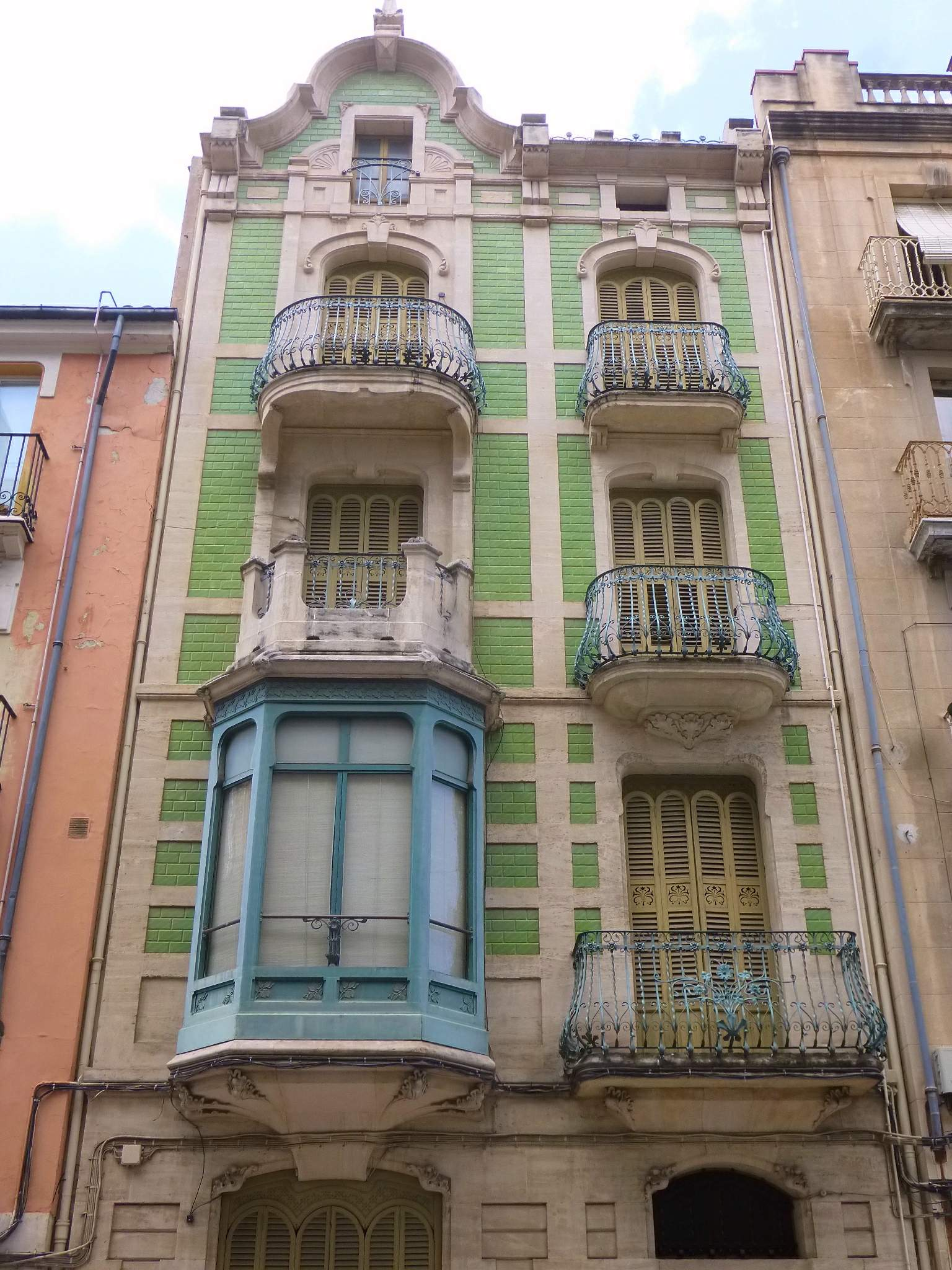
Casa Laporta (Laporta house), work of Timoteo Briet Montaud

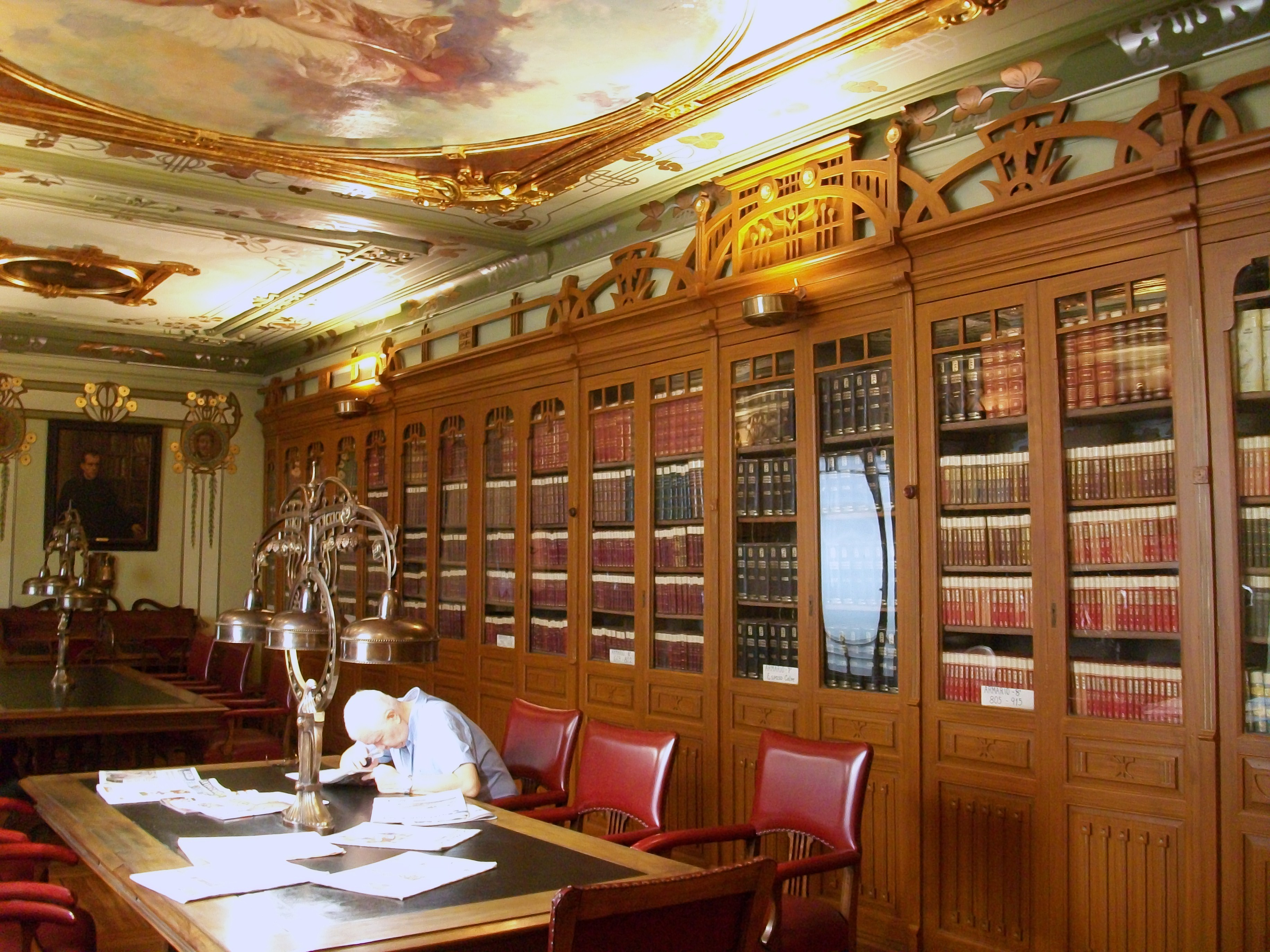
Library of the Circulo Industrial de Alcoy, work of Timoteo Briet Montaud

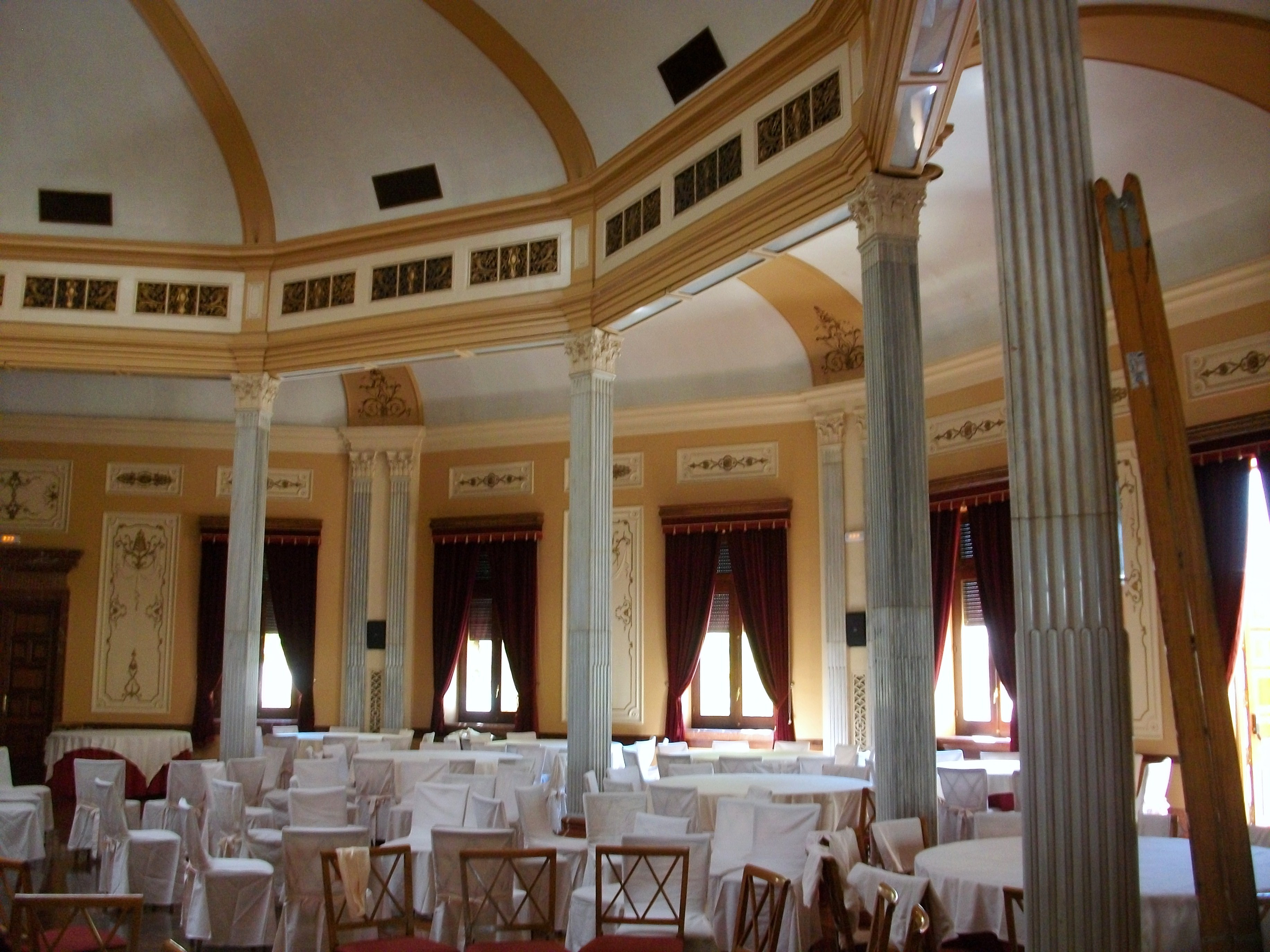
Roundabout hall in the Circulo Industrial de Alcoy

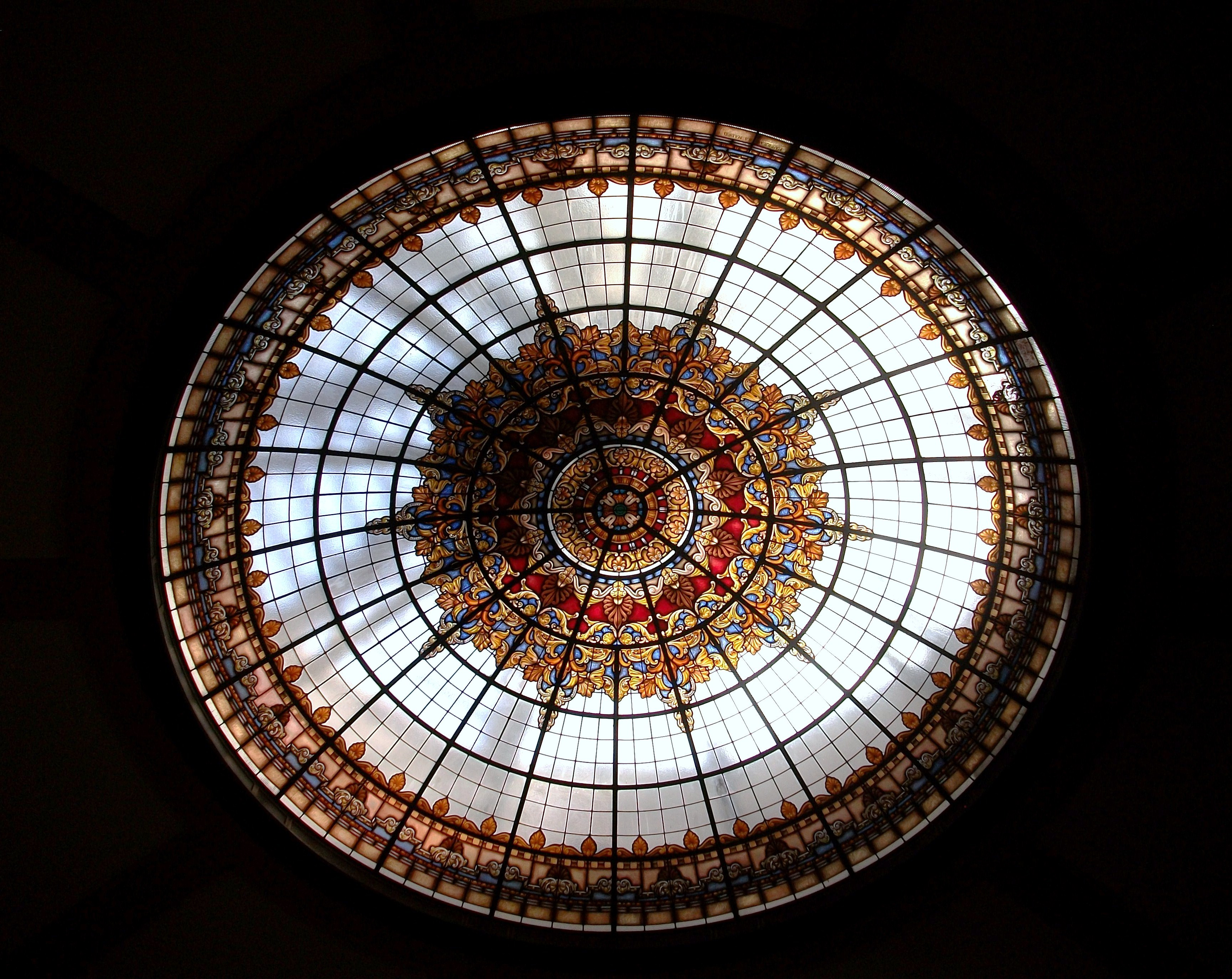
Stained glass at the roundabout hall in the Circulo Industrial de Alcoy

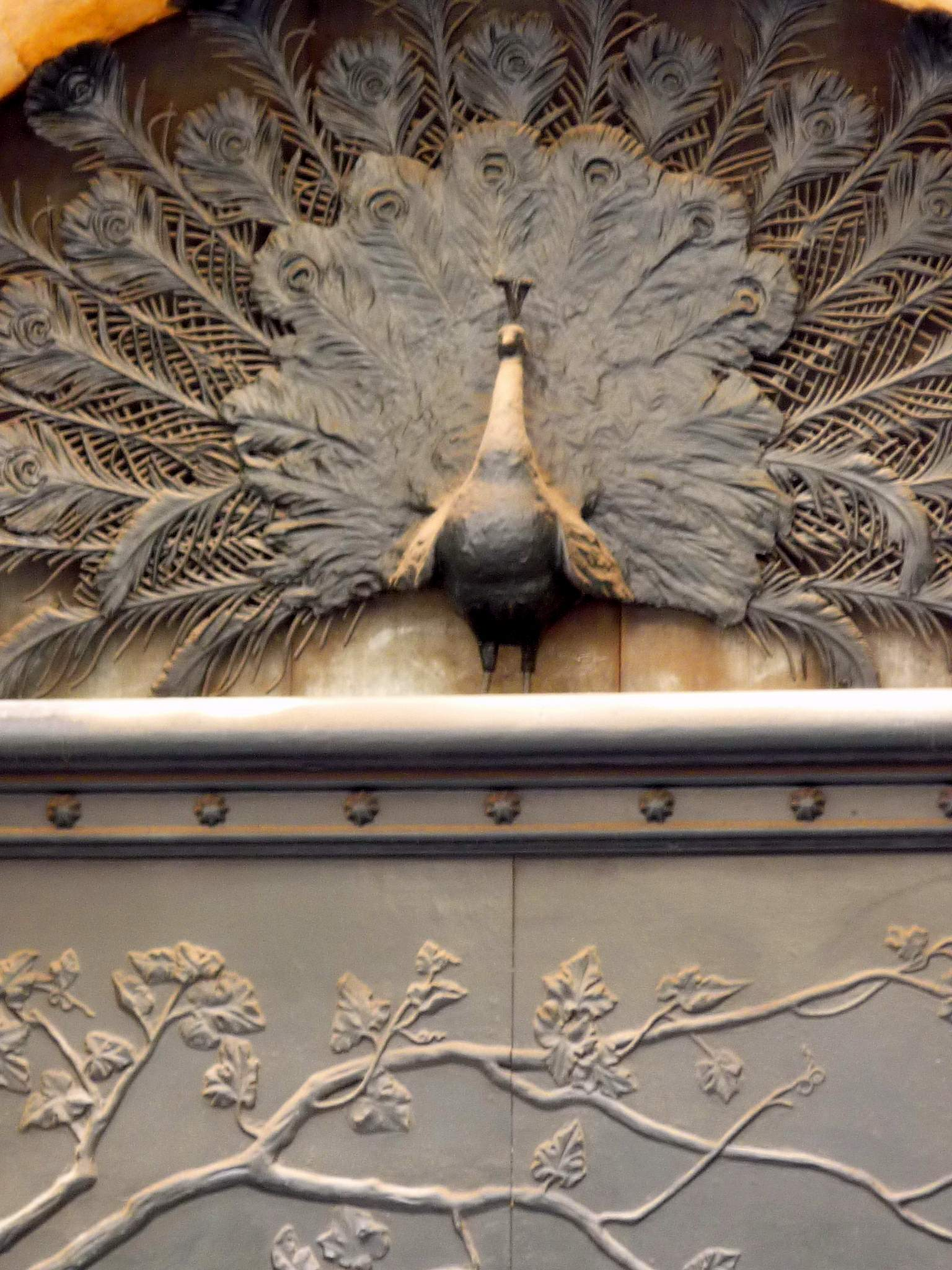
Iron sculpture of a peacock at the Casa del Pavo (Peacock house), work of Vicente Pascual Pastor

Art Nouveau in Alcoy (Spanish: modernismo en Alcoy, Valencian: modernisme en Alcoi), as one of the main focuses of the Valencian Art Nouveau, is the historiographic denomination given to an art and literature movement associated with the Art Nouveau in Alcoy (Alicante), Valencian Community, in Spain.

Its main form of expression was in architecture, but many other arts were involved (painting, sculpture, etc.), and especially the design and the decorative arts (cabinetmaking, carpentry, forged iron, ceramic tiles, ceramics, etc.), which were particularly important, especially in their role as support to architecture.

Although Art Nouveau was part of a general trend that emerged in Europe around the turn of the 20th century, in Alcoy the trend acquired its own unique personality in the context of spectacular urban and industrial development. It is equivalent to a number of other fin de siècle art movements going by the names of Art Nouveau in France and Belgium, Jugendstil in Germany, Sezession in Austria-Hungary, Liberty style in Italy and Modern or Glasgow Style in Scotland.

The Art Nouveau was active in Alcoy from roughly 1899 (art nouveau reform of the Glorieta Park in Alcoy) to 1915. The Modernisme movement in Alcoy is best known for its architectural expression, especially in the works of the architects Vicente Pascual Pastor and Timoteo Briet Montaud, but was also significant in sculpture and painting. Notable art nouveau painters from Alcoy include Fernando Cabrera Cantó, Francisco Laporta Valor, Emilio Sala, Adolfo Morrió, Edmundo Jordá and José Mataix Monllor. A notable art nouveau sculptor from Alcoy was Lorenzo Ridaura Gosálbez.

In the year 2010 Alcoy was included in the Art Nouveau European Route, an association of local governments and non-governmental institutions for the international promotion and protection of Art Nouveau heritage.

== Architecture ==
The main architects of the Art Nouveau movement in Alcoy were:

- Vicente Pascual Pastor: The art nouveau style of Vicente Pascual will have a few exuberant characteristics and a direct influence of the French and Belgian art nouveau.
- Timoteo Briet Montaud: His art nouveau style will be contained, rather formally and especially with a great influence of the Austrian art nouveau movement Secession, influence that it is present in all his art nouveau works.

They were not the only art nouveau architects who formed his stamp in Alcoy, but they are, undoubtedly, the main. On having been only two architects those who would realize the great majority of works of the Alcoy's art nouveau, it could seem that the relation of works are just a few. Both architects developed approximately sixty art nouveau constructions of all kind in Alcoy, which provides a precise enough idea of the special strength of the Alcoy's industrial bourgeois.

Both architects have in common his formation in Barcelona and the contemporary being to the architects of the Valencian Art Nouveau and the Catalan Modernisme, but also the two will exercise practically all his professional career in Alcoy, where the architectural art nouveau will receive special relevancy thanks to their art and their works.

Other local architects or engineers that have Art nouveau works in Alcoy are:

- Jorge Vilaplana Carbonell: Master builder of eclectic style with an Art nouveau building at avenida País Valencia 30 (30 País Valencià Avenue), (1911).
- José Cort Merita: Engineer who constructed the factory of calle Agres 8 (8 Agres Street) together with the architect Vicente Pascual Pastor, (1913).
- José Abad Carbonell: Municipal engineer, author of the art nouveau building of the El Molinar fountain, (1912), in the suburbs of Alcoy.
- Joaquín Aracil Aznar: author of the kiosk of Art Nouveau style at the Plaza de la Constitución (current Plaza de España) in 1917, work nowadays disappeared.

=== Art Nouveau buildings in Alcoy ===
Between the works of the Art Nouveau architecture in Alcoy stand out:

- Casa del Pavo (Peacock house), work of Vicente Pascual Pastor. (1909)
- Casa d'Escaló (Escaló house), work of Vicente Pascual Pastor. (1906-1908)
- Circulo Industrial de Alcoy, work of Timoteo Briet Montaud. (1909-1911)
- Casa Laporta (Laporta house), work of Timoteo Briet Montaud. (1904).
- Casa Vilaplana (Vilaplana house), work of Vicente Pascual Pastor. (1906).
- Casa Briet (Briet house), work of Timoteo Briet Montaud. (1910).
- Monte de Piedad y Caja de Ahorros de Alcoy
- Casa Mataix
- Edificio en calle Sant Llorenç 3
- Edificio en calle Sant Llorenç 5
- Edificio en calle Sant Llorenç 27
- Edificio en calle Sant Nicolau 4
- Edificio en calle Sant Nicolau 29
- Edificio en calle Sant Nicolau 35
- Cocheras en plaza Emili Sala 12
- Edificio en avenida País Valencià 30
- Edificio en calle Capellà Belloch 9
- Edificio en calle Sant Josep 26
- Edificios en calle Pintor Casanova 16, 18 y 20
- La Glorieta de Alcoy
- Edificios en calle Bartolomé José Gallardo 1, 3 y 5
- Kiosk of Art Nouveau style at the Plaza de la Constitución
- Alcoy Cemetery, art nouveau pantheons and sculptures.

=== Art Nouveau industrial architecture ===
Between the works of the industrial architecture of Art Nouveau style in Alcoy stand out:

- Campus of Alcoy of the Technical University of Valencia, work of Vicente Pascual Pastor.
- Canalejas Viaduct
- Hydroelectrics substation of Alcoy, work of Timoteo Briet Montaud. (1910).
- Fábricas en calle Sant Joan 43 y 45
- Edificio del Parque de Bomberos
- Taller de carruajes en calle Agres 5
- Fábrica en calle Agres 8
- Fábrica en calle Alcoleja 4
- Slaughterhouse of Alcoy
- Fuente de El Molinar de Alcoy

== Gallery ==
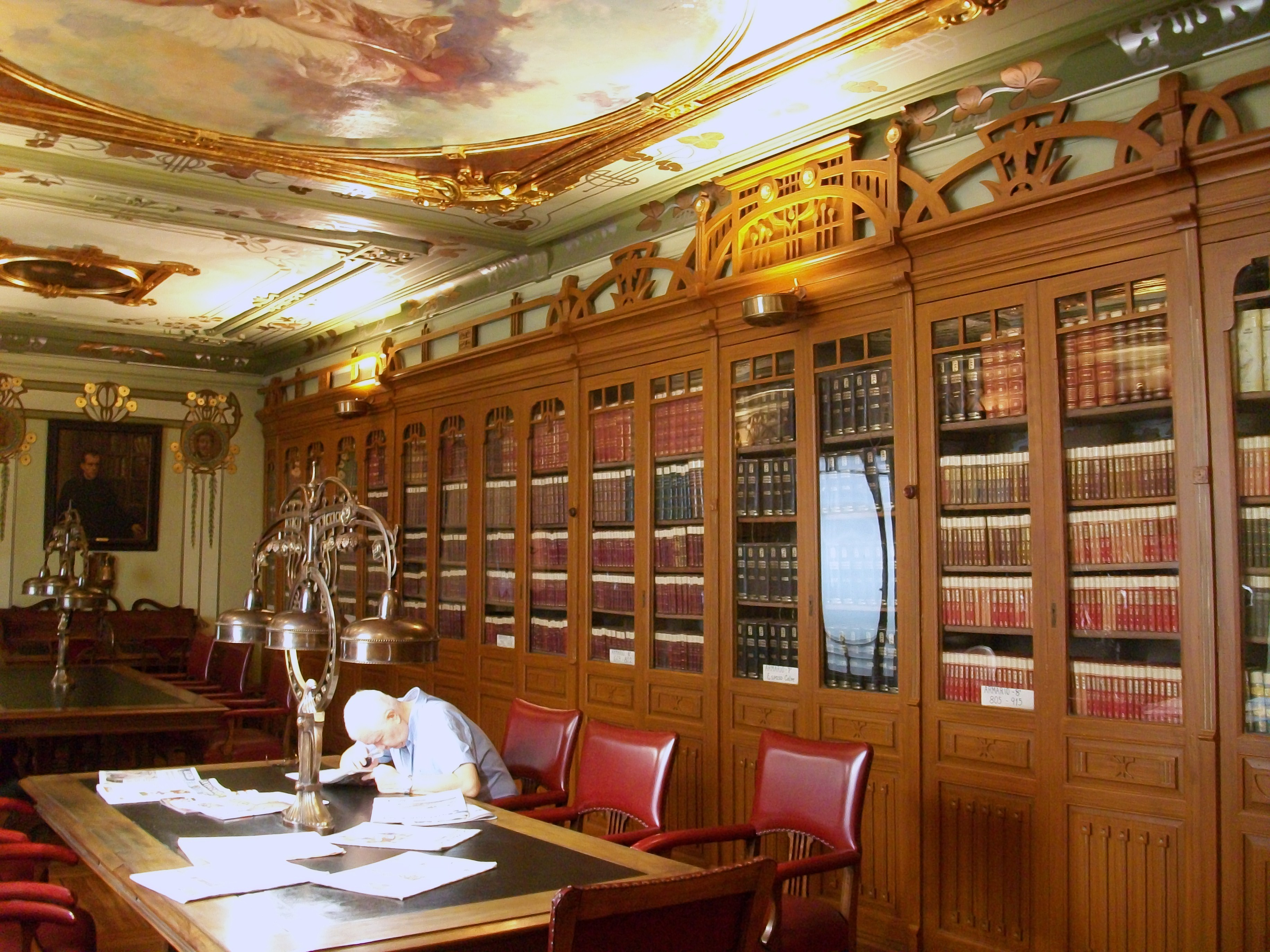
Library of the Circulo Industrial de Alcoy, work of Timoteo Briet Montaud.

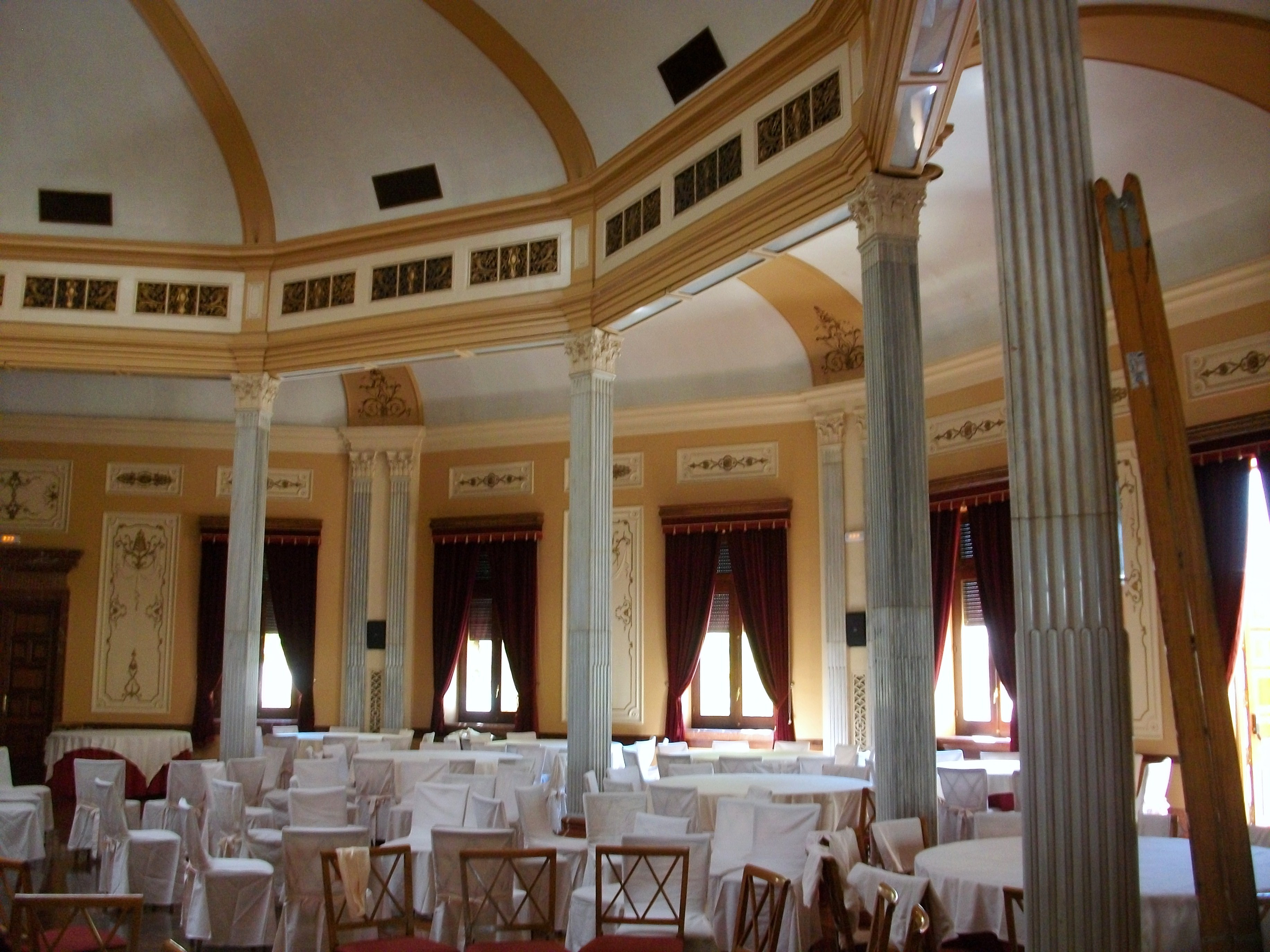
Roundabout hall in the Circulo Industrial de Alcoy.

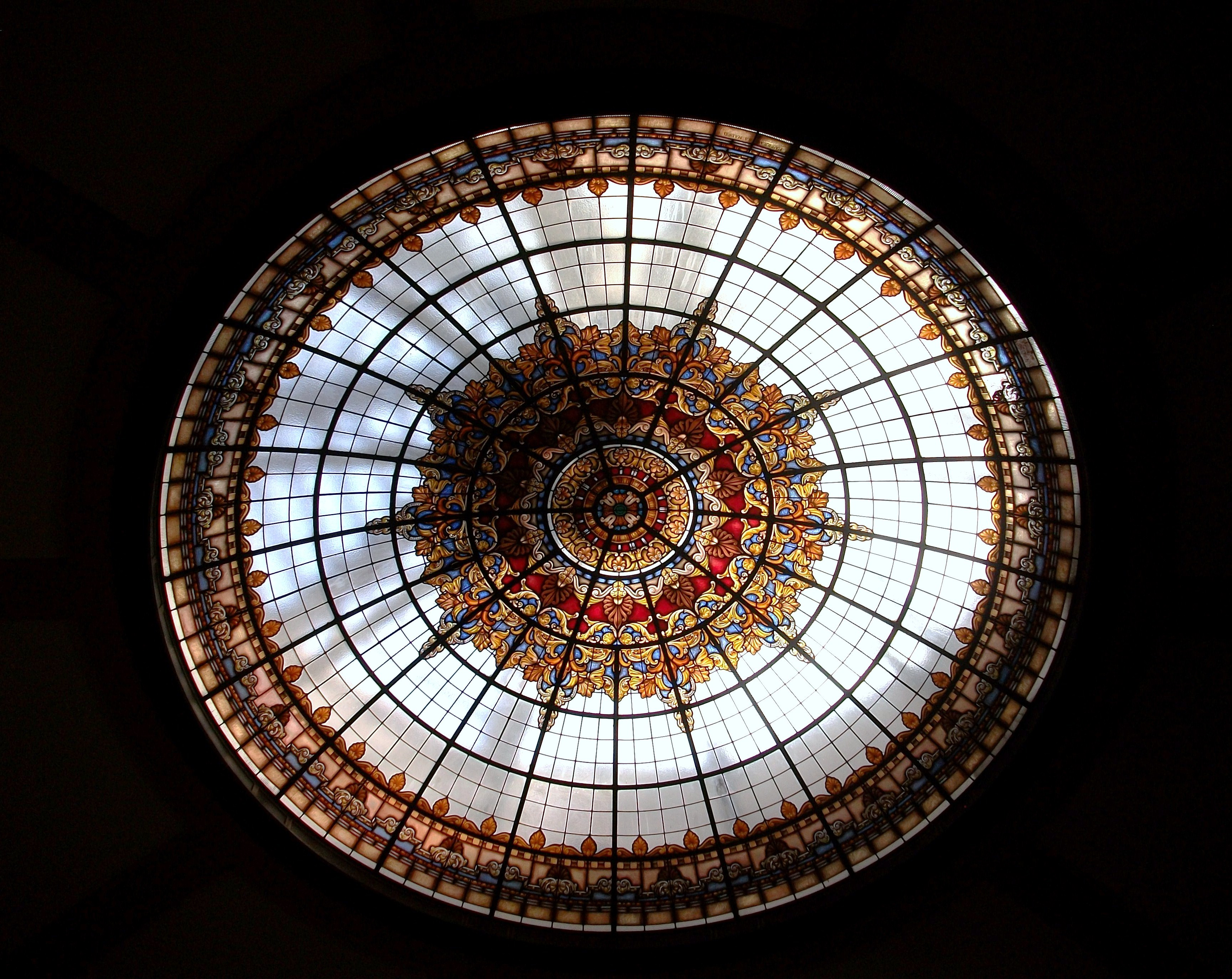
Stained glass at the roundabout hall in the Circulo Industrial de Alcoy.

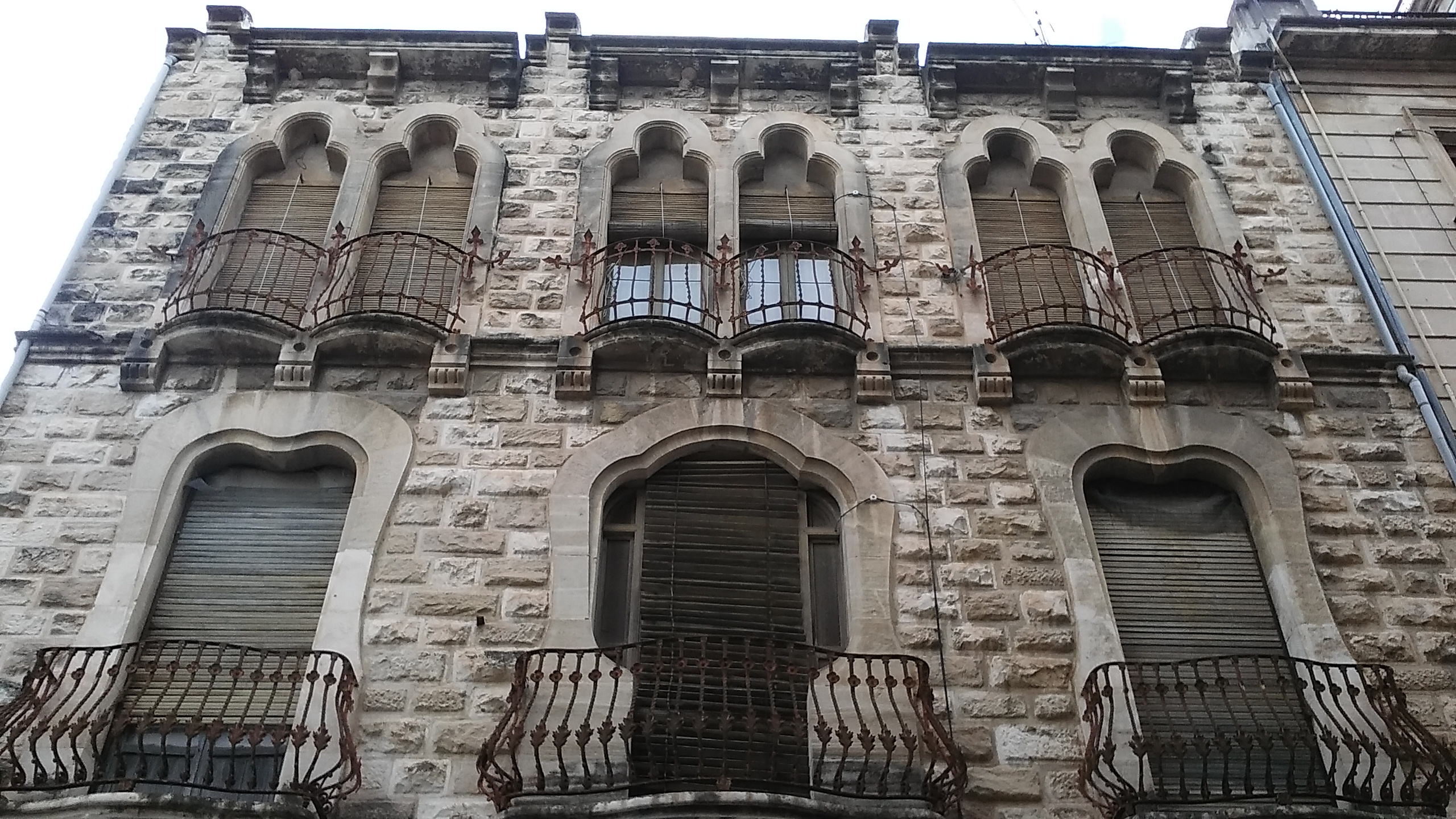
Facade of Casa Vilaplana (Vilaplana house), work of Vicente Pascual Pastor.

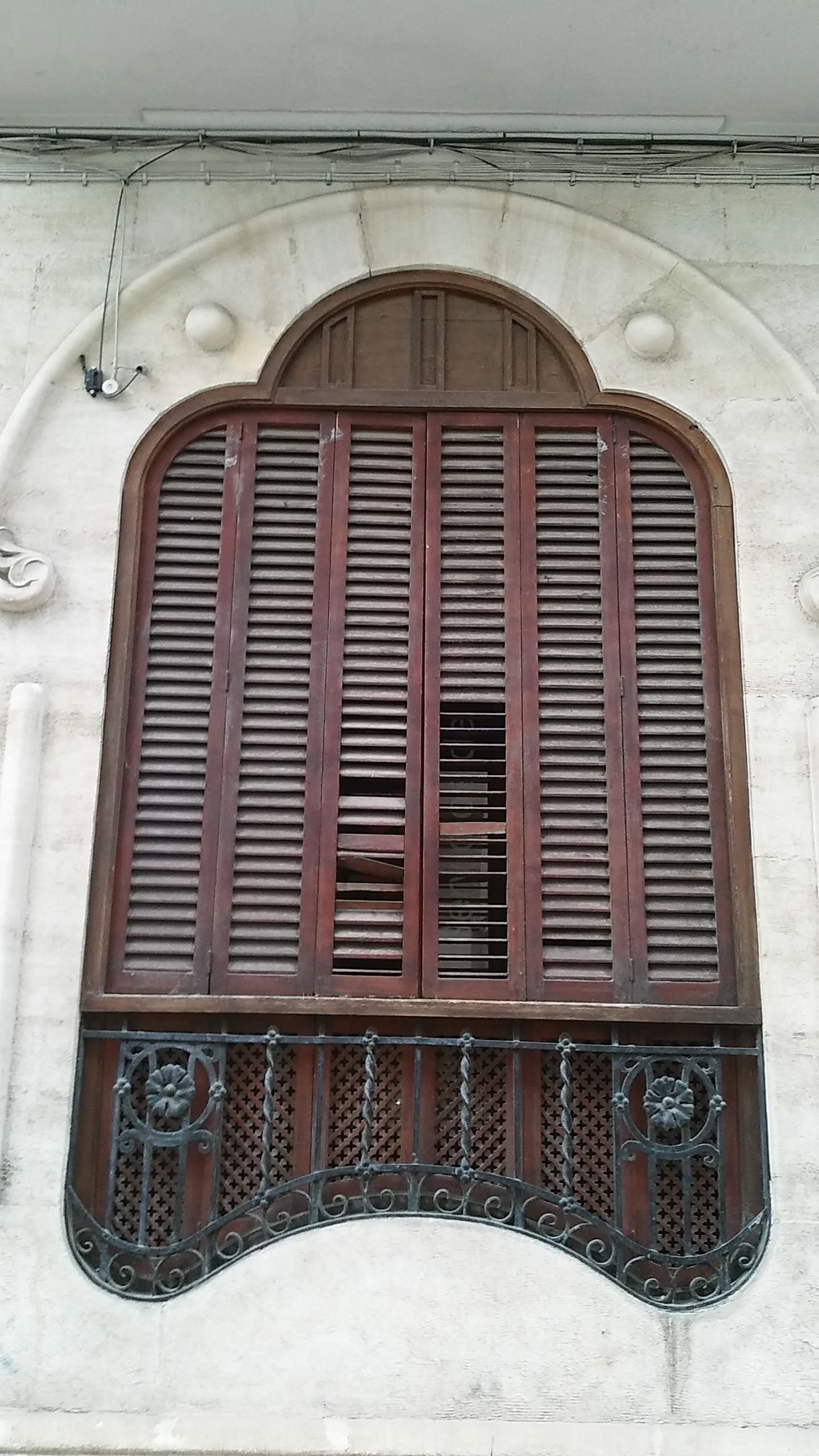
Window detail in the building of País Valencià number 30, work of Jorge Vilaplana Carbonell.

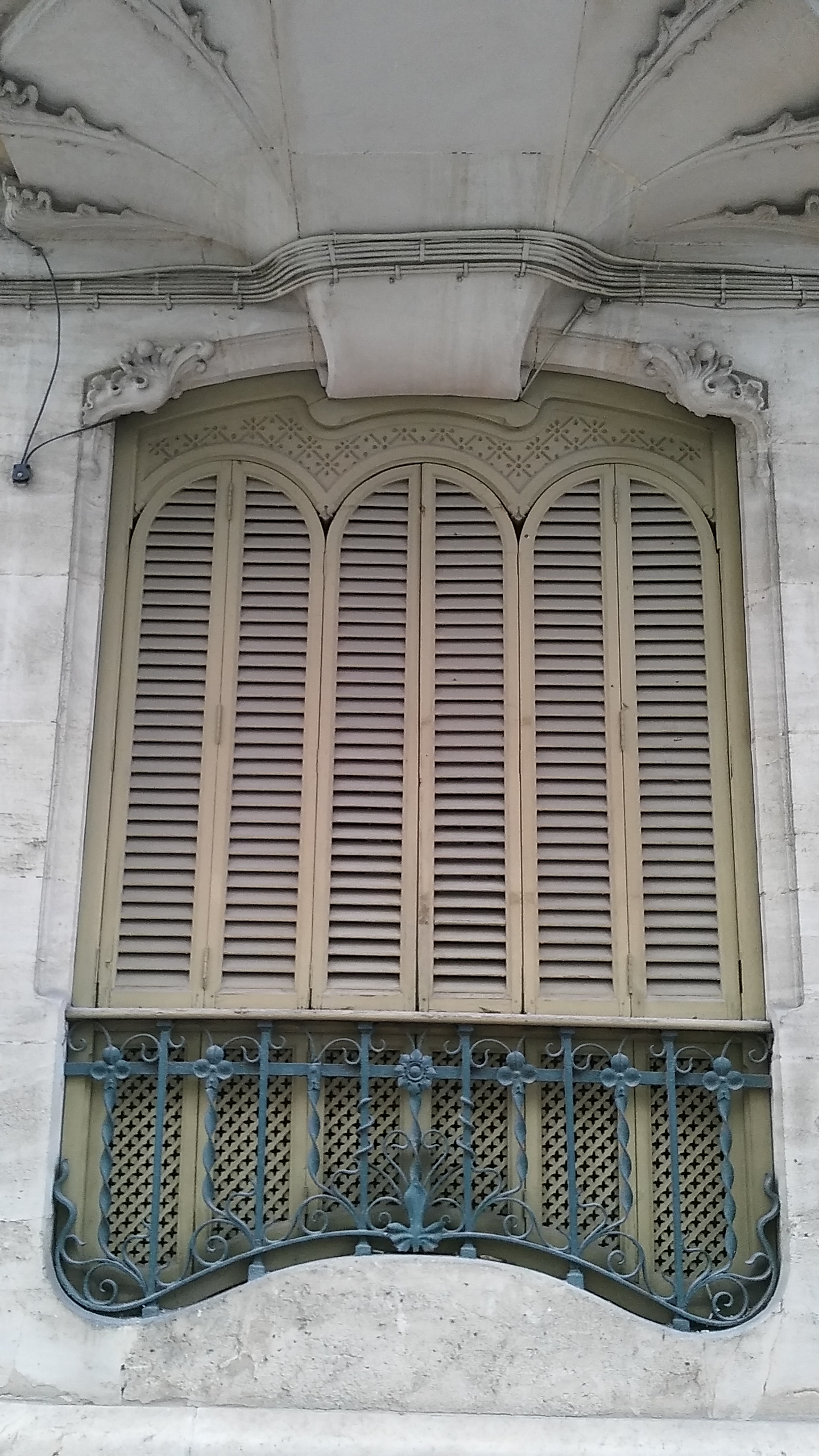
Window detail in Casa Laporta (Laporta house), work of Timoteo Briet Montaud.

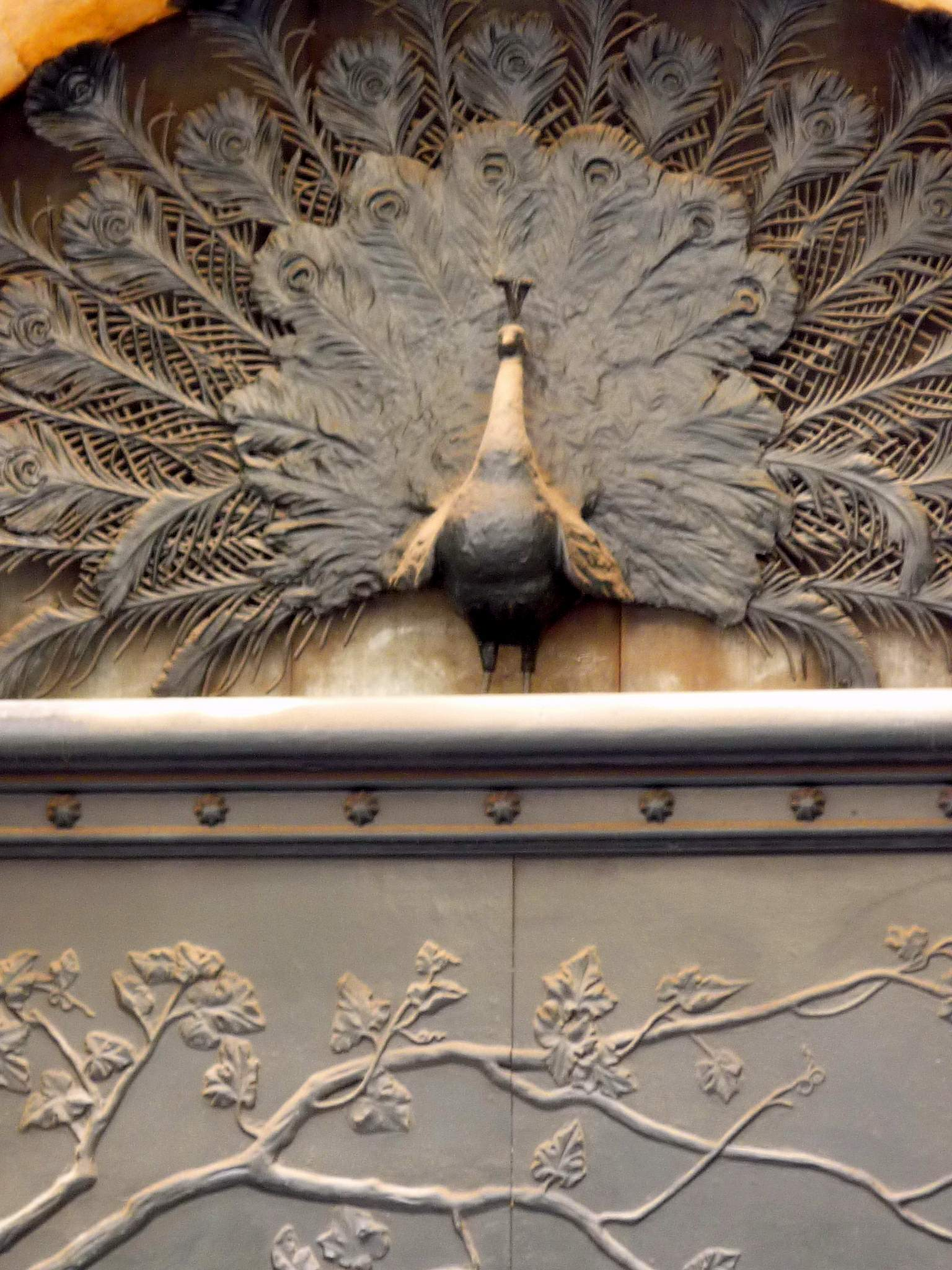
Iron sculpture of a peacock at the Casa del Pavo (Peacock House).

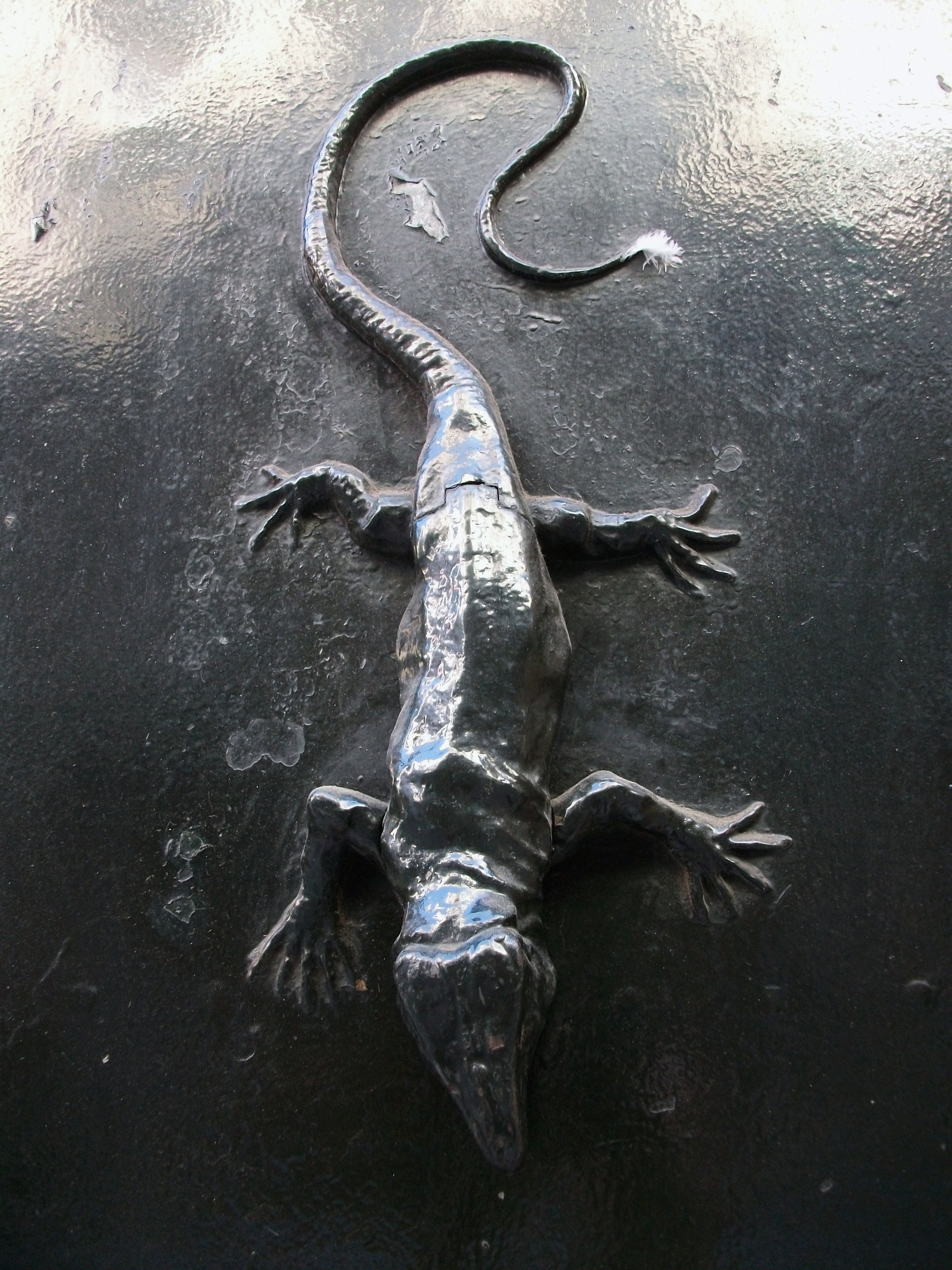
Iron sculpture in the Casa del Pavo (Peacock House).

== See also ==
- Valencian Art Nouveau
- Alcoy Cemetery

== Bibliography ==
- Doménech Romá, Jorge (2010). Modernismo en Alcoy, su contexto histórico y los oficios artesanales. Editorial Aguaclara. p. 497. ISBN 978-84-613-8233-0.
- Doménech Romá, Jorge (2013). Del Modernismo al Funcionalismo, características y evolución del movimiento modernista, el modernismo en Alcoy y Novelda (casos concretos). Publicaciones de la Universidad de Alicante. p. 224. ISBN 978-84-9717-267-7.
- Charron, Jacqueline (2009). Grafixman, ed. Alcoy contado por sus piedras y vida de Vicente Pascual. Cocentaina. ISBN 978-84-613-7040-5.
- Charron, Jacqueline (2002). Gráficas Alcoy, ed. Paseos arquitectónicos por Alcoy. Alcoy.
- Jaén i Urban, Gaspar (1999). Instituto Alicantino de Cultura Juan Gil-Albert, Colegio Territorial de Arquitectos de Alicante, ed. Guía de arquitectura de la provincia de Alicante. p. 311. ISBN 84-7784-353-8.
- Colomer Sendra, Vicente (2002). Colegio Oficial de Arquitectos de la Comunidad Valenciana, ed. Registro de Arquitectura del Siglo XX en la Comunidad Valenciana (en castellano/valenciano). p. 719. ISBN 84-87233-38-4.
