= Bocairent =

- Municipality
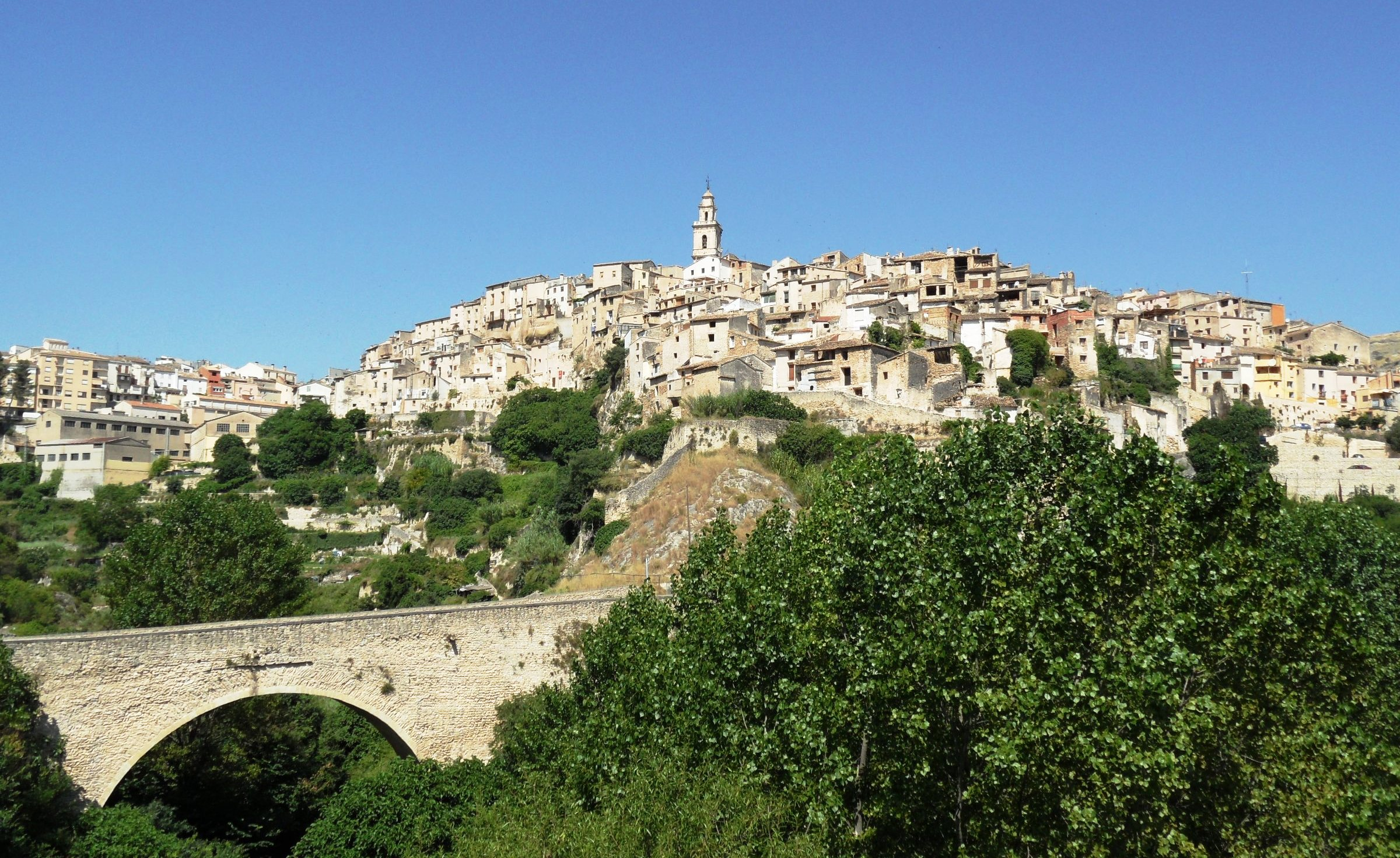
- General view

- Coat of arms

- Location in Spain
- Coordinates: 38°45′57″N 0°36′46″W
- Country: Spain
- Autonomous community: Valencian Community
- Province: Valencia
- Comarca: Vall d'Albaida
- Judicial district: Ontinyent

Government
  - Alcalde: Josep-Vicent Ferre Domínguez (2007) (PSOE)

Area
  - Total: 97 km^{2} (37 sq mi)
- Elevation: 680 m (2,230 ft)

Population (2025-01-01)
  - Total: 4,130
  - Density: 43/km^{2} (110/sq mi)
- Demonym(s): Bocairentí, bocairentina
- Time zone: UTC+1 (CET)
  - Summer (DST): UTC+2 (CEST)
- Postal code: 46880
- Official language(s): Valencian
- Website: Official website

Bocairent (Valencian pronunciation: [bokajˈɾent], Spanish: Bocairente) is a municipality in the comarca of Vall d'Albaida in the Valencian Community, Spain.

== See also ==
- Serra Mariola Natural Park
- List of municipalities in Valencia
