= Edificio Herdocia =

Historic building in San Jose, Costa Rica

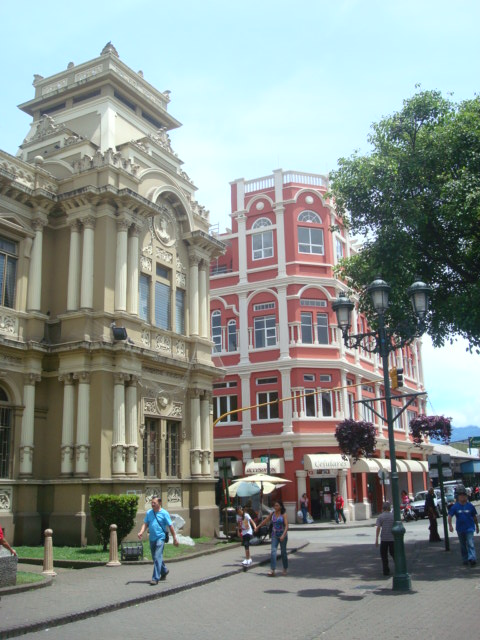
- View of Edificio Herdocia (right), next to the Edificio de Correos y Telégrafos de Costa Rica.
- Interactive map of Edificio Herdocia
- Address: 3rd Avenue and 2nd Street; San José, Costa Rica
- Coordinates: 9°56′9″N 84°4′47″W
- Current use: Business and office

Construction
- Built: 1920
- Opened: 1945
- Reopened: 2012

The Edificio Herdocia is a four-story property located in San Jose, Costa Rica. It was built in 1945 by Catalan architect Luis Llach Llagostera. It is located on the corner of 2nd Street and Avenue 3 of the Central American capital, north of the Edificio Correos, with which it forms one of the most recognized architectural ensembles of the Josefino neighborhood. Its architectural style combines art deco with neoclassical. Considered to be of great beauty and historical value, was declared a Historical Architectural Heritage of Costa Rica in February 2000. Its name comes from Carmen Herdocia Rojas, who was its first owner.

== History ==
The land where the Edificio Herdocia is located has had several owners since the middle of the 19th Century. In 1934, the property was inherited by Carmen Herdocia Rojas, at the time a student in London. The house that existed on the land was demolished in 1945 to make way for the beginning of construction. From the time of completion until today, it has been used commercially.

On December 20, 1999, Decree 7555 was issued, whose 7th and 8th articles declared the building to be a Historical Architectural Heritage of Costa Rica, which became effective with its publication in the official newspaper La Gaceta on February 23, 2000. After several years of abandonment, vandalism, and neglect, it was restored by the Heritage Center of the Ministry of Culture at a cost of 90 million colones (about $180,000), with the aim of rescuing its historical facade.

== Architecture ==
The building's architecture marks a transition between the neoclassical style and Catalan modernism. It stands out as uncharacteristic of the usual style of architect Luis Llach. It is his only building that has more than two floors. Its structure is primarily brick and concrete. It has four symmetrical levels, with a central tower that occupies the main corner of the building. It is best known for its facade, which is considered a simplification of the neoclassical style, with attached columns with pedestals and capitals. It has baroque features, especially in the windows, such as the helices that span them and the arches at the center of the crowning relief. Towards the north and west on the fourth floor, there are several concrete pergolas with neoclassical figureheads. The decoration shows historical embellishments such as pilasters and corbels alongside simpler, more modern elements such as the cornices and pediments.
