= Enrique Nieto =

Enrique Nieto may refer to:

- Enrique Nieto (architect) (1880/83–1954), Catalan architect
- Enrique Peña Nieto (born 1966), President of Mexico
