= Palacio Cabanellas =

Coordinates: 32.949245°S 60.638904°W

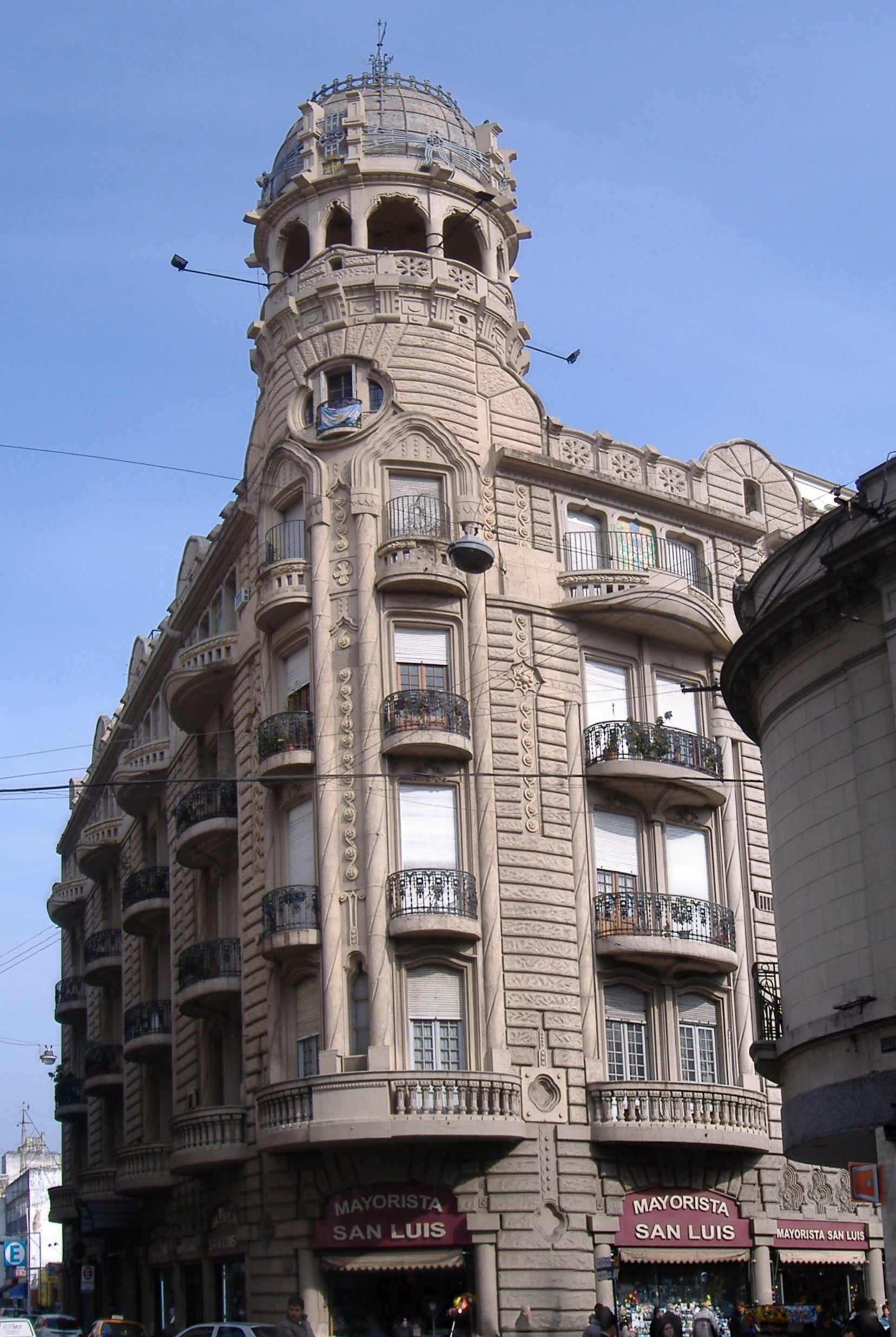
Palacio Cabanellas

The Palacio Cabanellas (Spanish, Cabanellas Palace) is a historical building in the city of Rosario, Santa Fe Province, Argentina. It is located in the downtown area, occupying the southwestern corner of San Luis St. and Sarmiento St.

The palace was projected around 1914 by the Mallorcan architect Francisco Roca (Francesc Roca i Simó), who had been personally influenced by Antoni Gaudí during his studies in Barcelona. It was built in 1916 under the direction of Luis B. Laporte. It is one of very few examples of Modernisme (Catalan-style Art Nouveau) found in Rosario.

It was restored under official sponsorship during the mid-2000s, in order to repair fissures and replace outer details.

In 2006 the Palacio was one of the locations of the movie ¿De quién es el portaligas? (released 2007), directed by Rosario-born popular composer Fito Páez.
