= Masia Freixa =

Building in Terrassa, Catalonia, Spain

- Masia Freixa
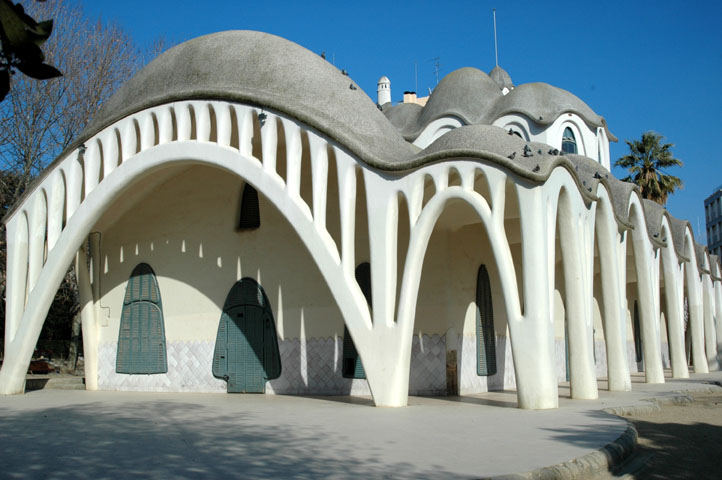
- Interactive map of the Masia Freixa area

General information
- Architectural style: modernisme
- Location: Terrassa, Parc de Sant Jordi - Pl. Freixa i Argemí, 11., Terrassa, Catalonia (Spain)
- Coordinates: 41°33′47″N 2°00′15″E
- Inaugurated: 1896
- Renovated: 1907
- Owner: Ajuntament de Terrassa

The Masia Freixa is a modernisme building located in Parc de Sant Jordi in Terrassa, Catalonia, Spain.

== History ==
Designed in 1896 to be a textile factory, the actual form of the building was planned in 1907, when Catalan industrialist Josep Freixa decided to transform his factory into a family residence and entrusted the work to the architect Lluís Muncunill.

The building has a rectangular floorplan covered by a structure of arches and vaults inspired by Antoni Gaudí, white walls and a tall tower. The shiny grey aspect of the original roof is a result of small pieces of glass being added to the mortar. The porch has a white ceramic handrail. On the eastern side, next to the main section of the building, there is a rotunda with two floors. The interior was designed by Joaquim Vancells and the furnishings in the dining room and the office still remain. The garden, which was designed by the period artist Rafael Benet i Vancells, has a Romantic influence. This is one of the most representative gardens in Terrassa from the beginning of the 20th century.

The Freixa country house was the headquarters of the Terrassa Musical Conservatoire for many years. Since 2006, it has housed the Municipal Tourism Service and the local ombudsman.

On 2018 there was a proposal by chef Carles Tejedor and architects Jon Tugores & Marc Armengol to reconvert it into a gastronomic space, under a petition by the local town council.
