= Joan Rubió =

Spanish architect

Joan Rubió i Bellver
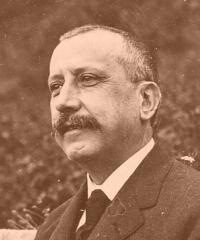
- Born: 24 April 1870
- Died: 30 November 1952 (aged 82)
- Occupation: Architect
- Practice: Modernista
- Buildings: La Sagrada Familia, the Casa Batlló, the Parc Güell, restoration of La Seu

Joan Rubió y Bellver (Catalan pronunciation: [ʒuˈan ruβiˈo]; 24 April 1870 – 30 November 1952) was a Spanish architect famous for his contributions to the Catalan Modernista movement.

== Biography ==
=== Early life, family ===
Rubió was born in Reus, Province of Tarragona. He was also the brother of the military engineer Marià Rubió i Bellver and uncle of the architect Nicolau Maria Rubió i Tudurí and the engineer Santiago Rubió i Tudurí.

=== Design career ===
A keen disciple of Antoni Gaudí, he collaborated with him until 1905, on such works as La Sagrada Família, the Casa Batlló, the Casa Calvet, the Torre Bellesguard and Parc Güell in Barcelona, the restoration of La Seu (the cathedral of Palma de Mallorca), and the Colònia Güell (factory town) in Santa Coloma de Cervelló, where Rubió built the agricultural cooperativa building with Francesc Berenguer in 1900, along with two private homes: Ca l'Ordal (1894) and Ca l'Espinal (1900). When designing houses the architect had a prevalence for bow window on the corners of his designs.

Rubió was also a regidor (councillor) on the Barcelona City Council (Ajuntament de Barcelona, 1905) and was appointed an architect for the Province of Barcelona (1906-1943) by the Barcelona Provincial Council (Diputació de Barcelona). His architecture is also prevalent on the Balearic Islands, for example in the northern town of Sóller, on Mallorca, where he designed the façade of the Church of Sant Bartomeu (1904) as well as the Banco de Sóller (1912), remarkable for its intricate ironwork (wrought iron).

== Notable works and collaborations ==
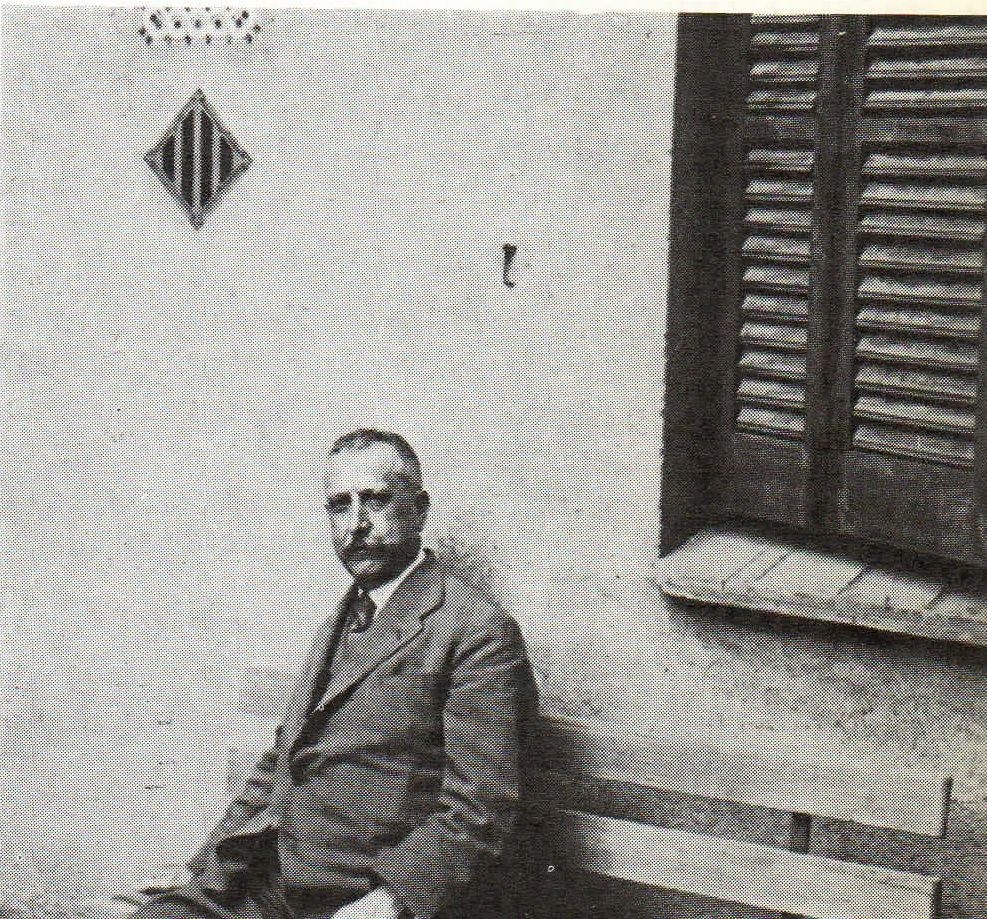
Joan Rubió

Many of the following works are collaborations with Antoni Gaudí.

- La Sagrada Familia
- the Casa Batlló
- the Casa Calvet
- the Torre Bellesguard
- Parc Güell in Barcelona
- the restoration of La Seu (the cathedral of Palma de Mallorca)
- 1894: Ca l'Ordal - - in Colònia Güell (factory town) in Santa Coloma de Cervelló
- 1900: agricultural cooperativa building with Francesc Berenguer - in Colònia Güell
- 1900: Ca l'Espinal - private home in Colònia Güell
- 1901: Casa Golferichs in Barcelona.
- 1904: façade of the church of Sant Bartomeu - Sóller, on Mallorca
- 1903-1909: Anti-tuberculosis sanatorium (Barcelona, Can Rectoret neighborhood)
- 1912: façade of Banco de Sóller with intricate ironwork (wrought iron) - Sóller
- 1928: neo-gothic bridge over Carrer del Bisbe, in Barcelona.

== Gallery ==
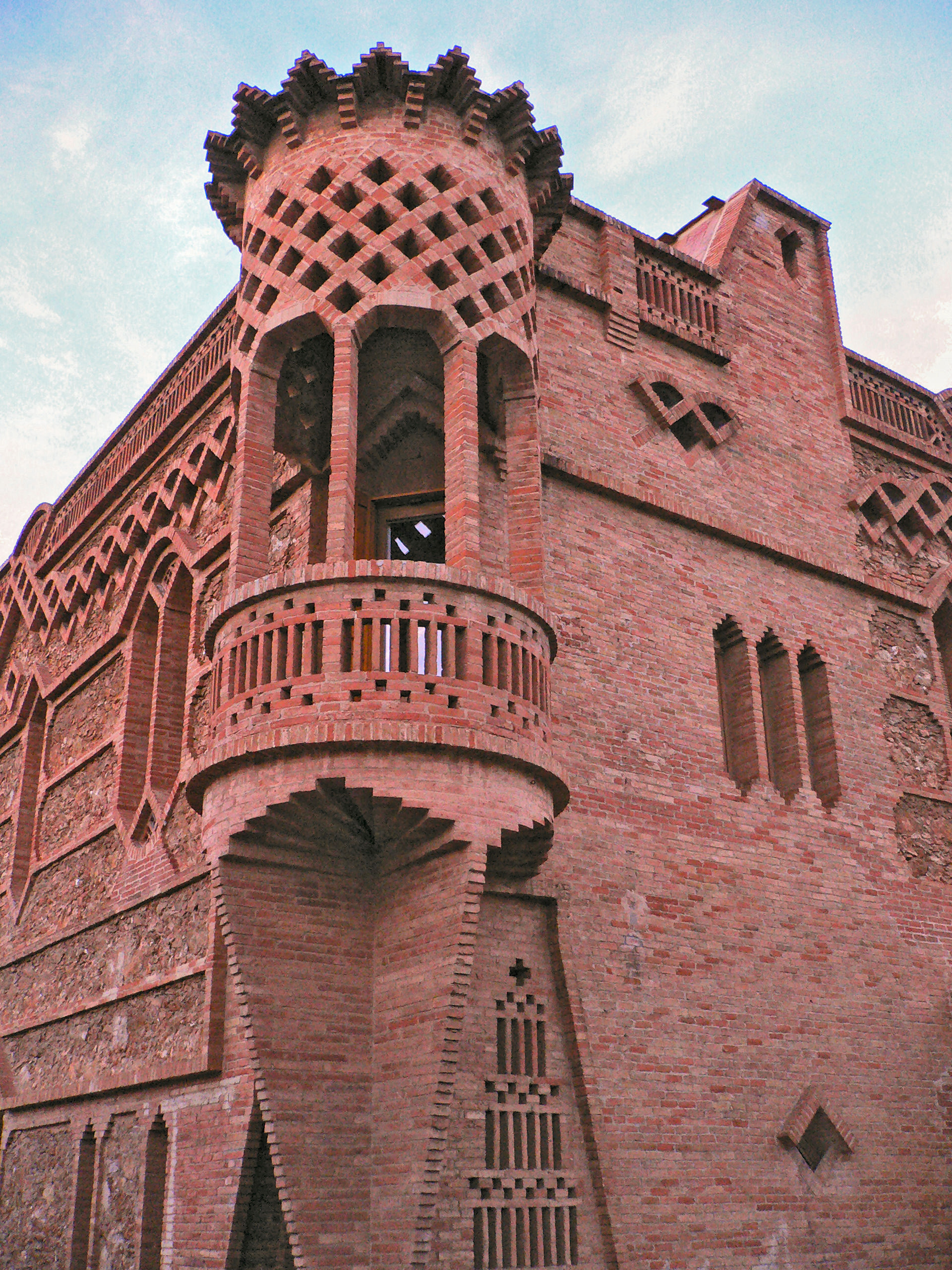
Modernisme style residence by Bellver in Catalonia.

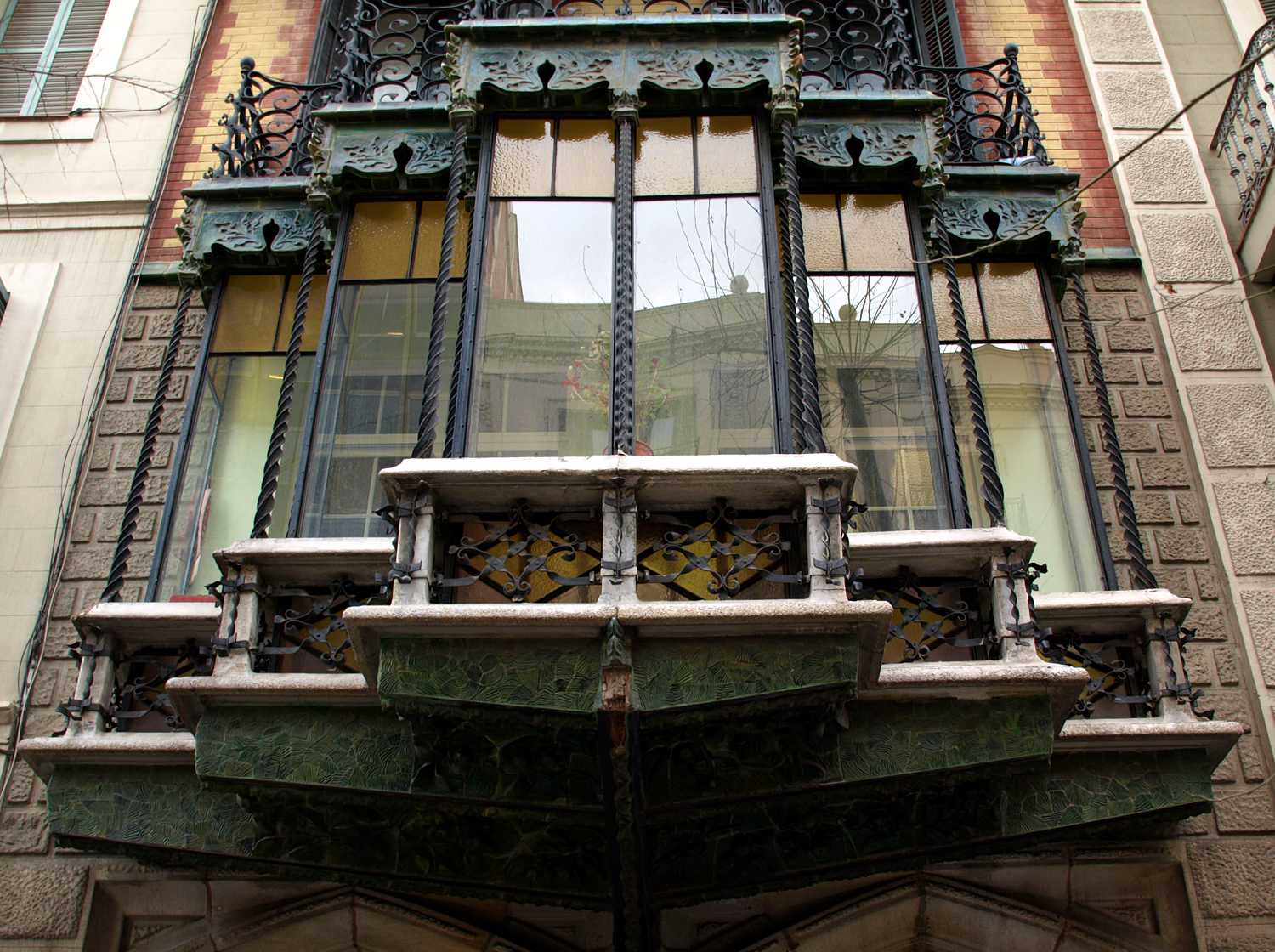
A bow window on the Casa Pomar.

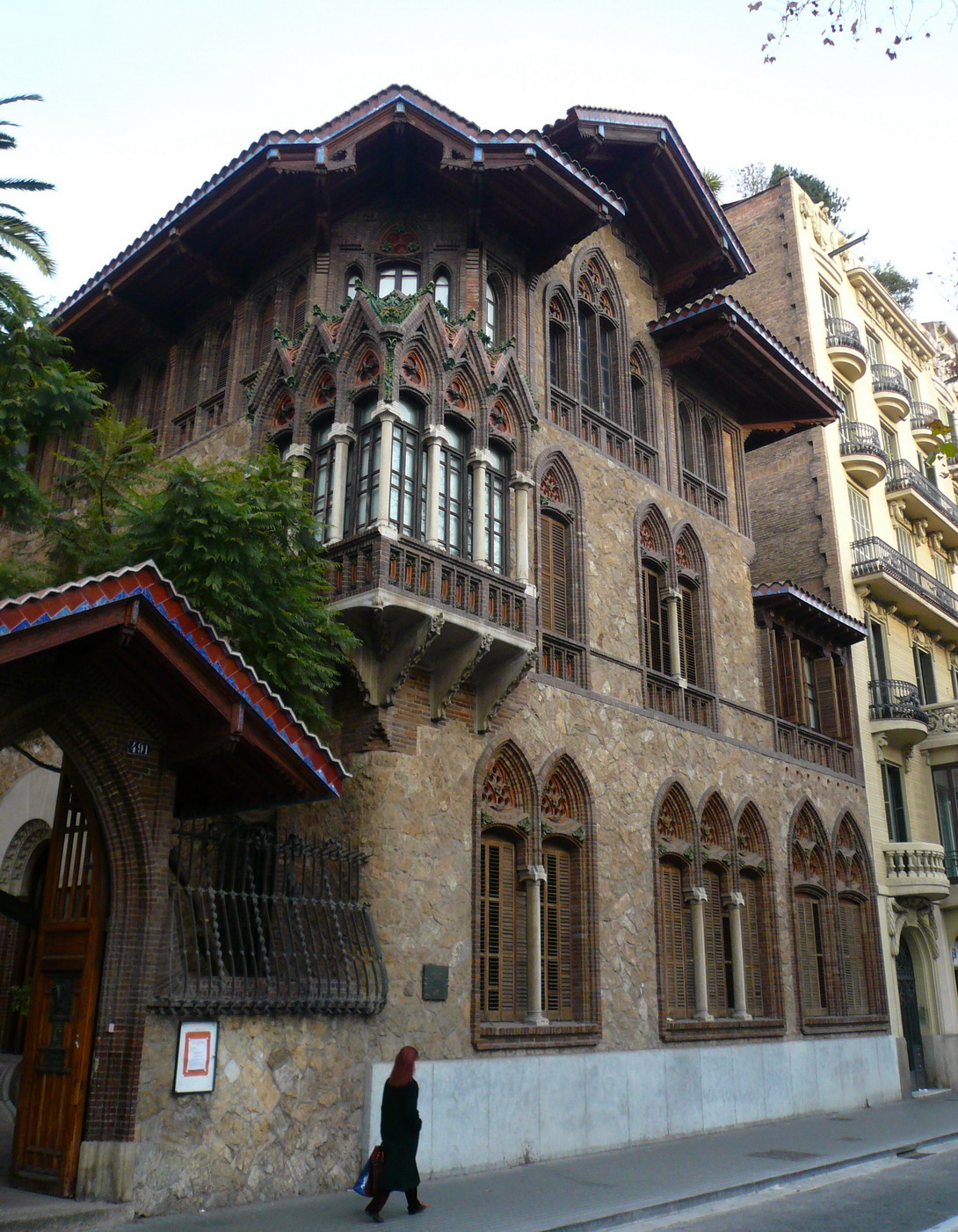
Casa Golferichs in Barcelona

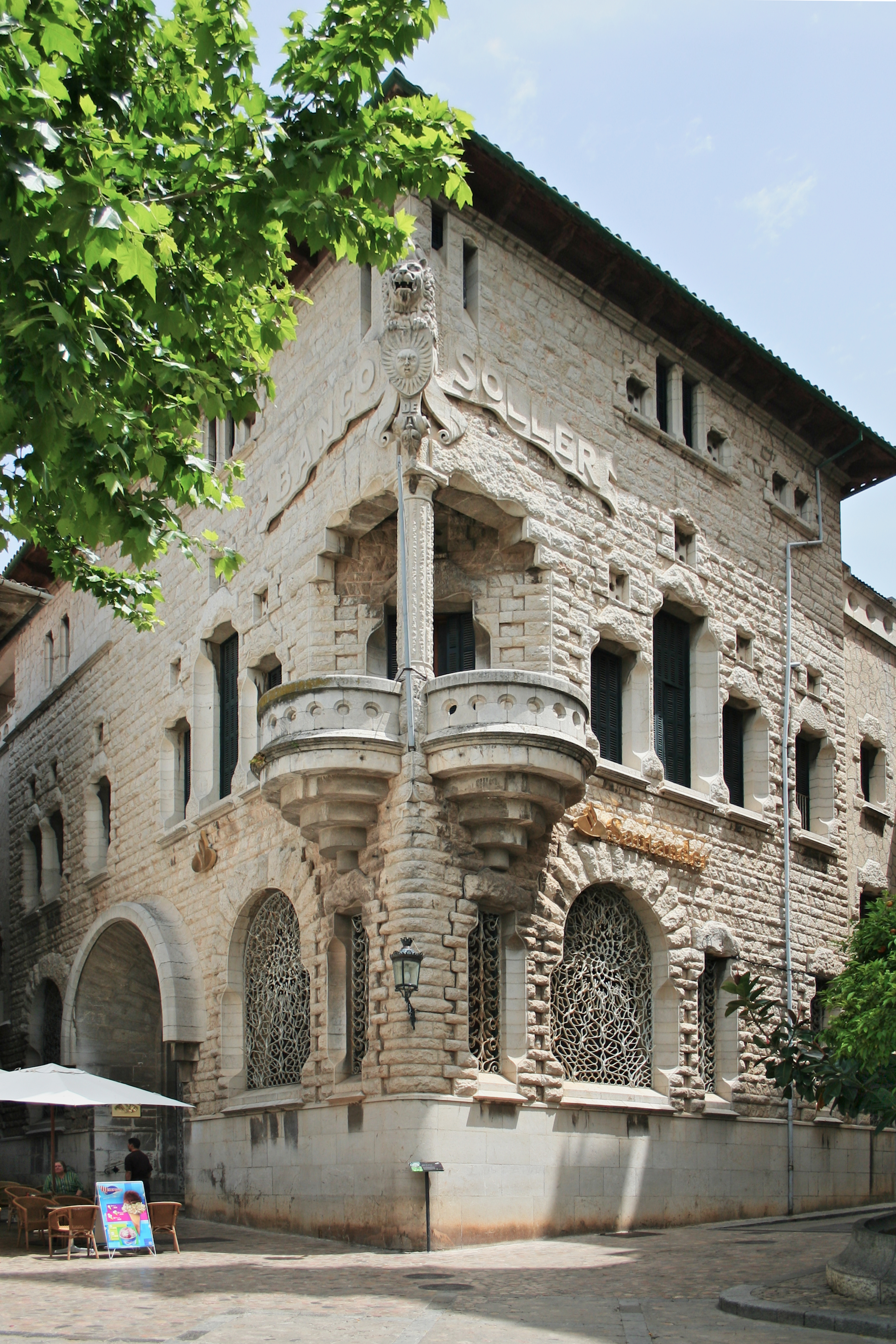
Banc de Sóller, in Sóller, Mallorca.

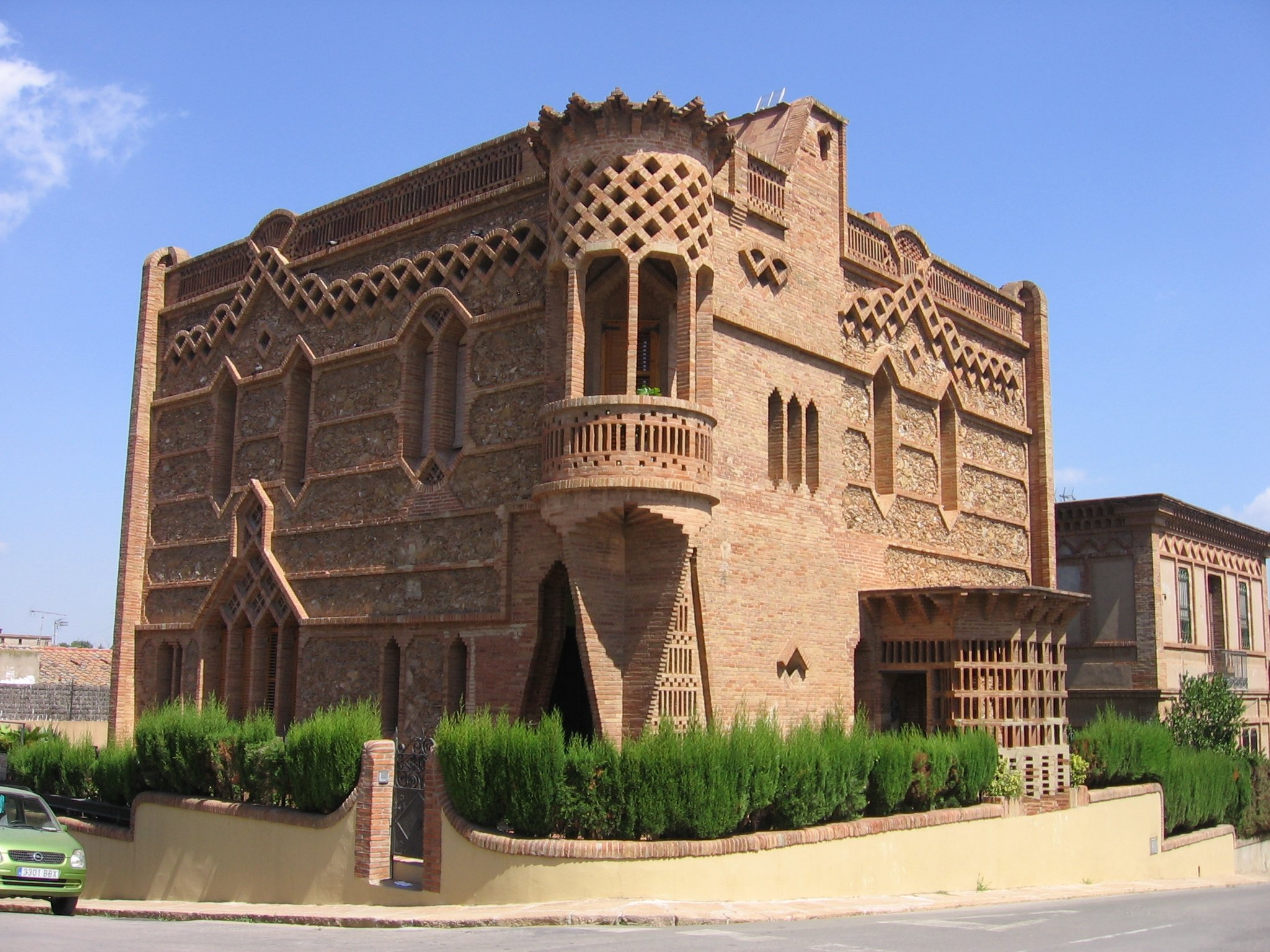
Ca l'Espinal, private home in the Colònia Güell (factory town), in the municipality of Santa Coloma de Cervelló, El Baix Llobregat, near Barcelona.
