= Modernisme =

Architectural and artistic movement originating in Catalonia, Spain

Modernisme (pronounced [muðəɾˈnizmə]; Catalan for 'modernism'), also known as Catalan modernism and Catalan art nouveau, is the historiographic denomination given to an art and literature movement associated with the search for a new entitlement of Catalan culture, one of the most predominant cultures within Spain. Nowadays, it is considered a movement based on the cultural revindication of a Catalan identity. Its main form of expression was Modernista architecture, but it also encompassed many other arts, such as painting and sculpture, and especially design and the decorative arts (cabinetmaking, carpentry, forged iron, ceramic tiles, ceramics, glass-making, silver and goldsmith work, etc.), which were particularly important, especially in their role as support to architecture. Modernisme was also a literary movement (poetry, fiction, drama).

Although Modernisme was part of a general trend that emerged in Europe around the turn of the 20th century, in Catalonia the trend acquired its own unique personality. Modernisme's distinct name comes from its special relationship, primarily with Catalonia and Barcelona, which were intensifying their local characteristics for socio-ideological reasons after the revival of Catalan culture and in the context of spectacular urban and industrial development. It is equivalent to a number of other fin de siècle art movements going by the names of Art Nouveau in France and Belgium, Jugendstil in Germany, Vienna Secession in Austria-Hungary, Liberty style in Italy, and Modern or Glasgow Style in Scotland.

Modernisme was active from roughly 1888 (the First Barcelona World Fair) to 1911 (the death of Joan Maragall, the most important Modernista poet). The Modernisme movement was centred in the city of Barcelona, though it reached far beyond, and is best known for its architectural expression, especially in the work of Antoni Gaudí, Lluís Domènech i Montaner and Josep Puig i Cadafalch, but was also significant in sculpture, poetry, theatre and painting. Notable painters include Santiago Rusiñol, Ramon Casas, Isidre Nonell, Hermen Anglada Camarasa, Joaquim Mir, Eliseu Meifrèn, Lluïsa Vidal, and Miquel Utrillo. Notable sculptors are Josep Llimona, Eusebi Arnau, and Miquel Blay.

== Main concepts ==
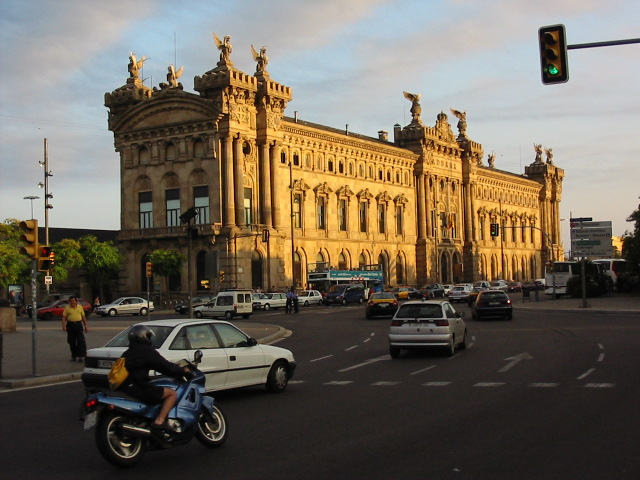
Duana de Barcelona (Customs House), by Enric Sagnier

Catalan nationalism was an important influence upon Modernista artists, who were receptive to the ideas of Valentí Almirall and Enric Prat de la Riba and wanted Catalan culture to be regarded as equal to that of other European countries. Such ideas can be seen in some of Rusiñol's plays against the Spanish army (most notably L'Hèroe), in some authors close to anarchism (Jaume Brossa and Gabriel Alomar, for example) or in the articles of federalist anti-monarchic writers such as Miquel dels Sants Oliver. They also opposed the traditionalism and religiousness of the Renaixença Catalan Romantics, whom they ridiculed in plays such as Santiago Rusiñol's Els Jocs Florals de Canprosa (roughly, "The Poetry Contest of Proseland"), a satire of the revived Jocs Florals and the political milieu which promoted them.

Modernistes largely rejected bourgeois values, which they thought to be the opposite of art. Consequently, they adopted two stances: they either set themselves apart from society in a bohemian or culturalist attitude (Decadent and Parnassian poets, Symbolist playwrights, etc.) or they attempted to use art to change society (Modernista architects and designers, playwrights inspired by Henrik Ibsen, some of Maragall's poetry, etc.)

== Architecture ==
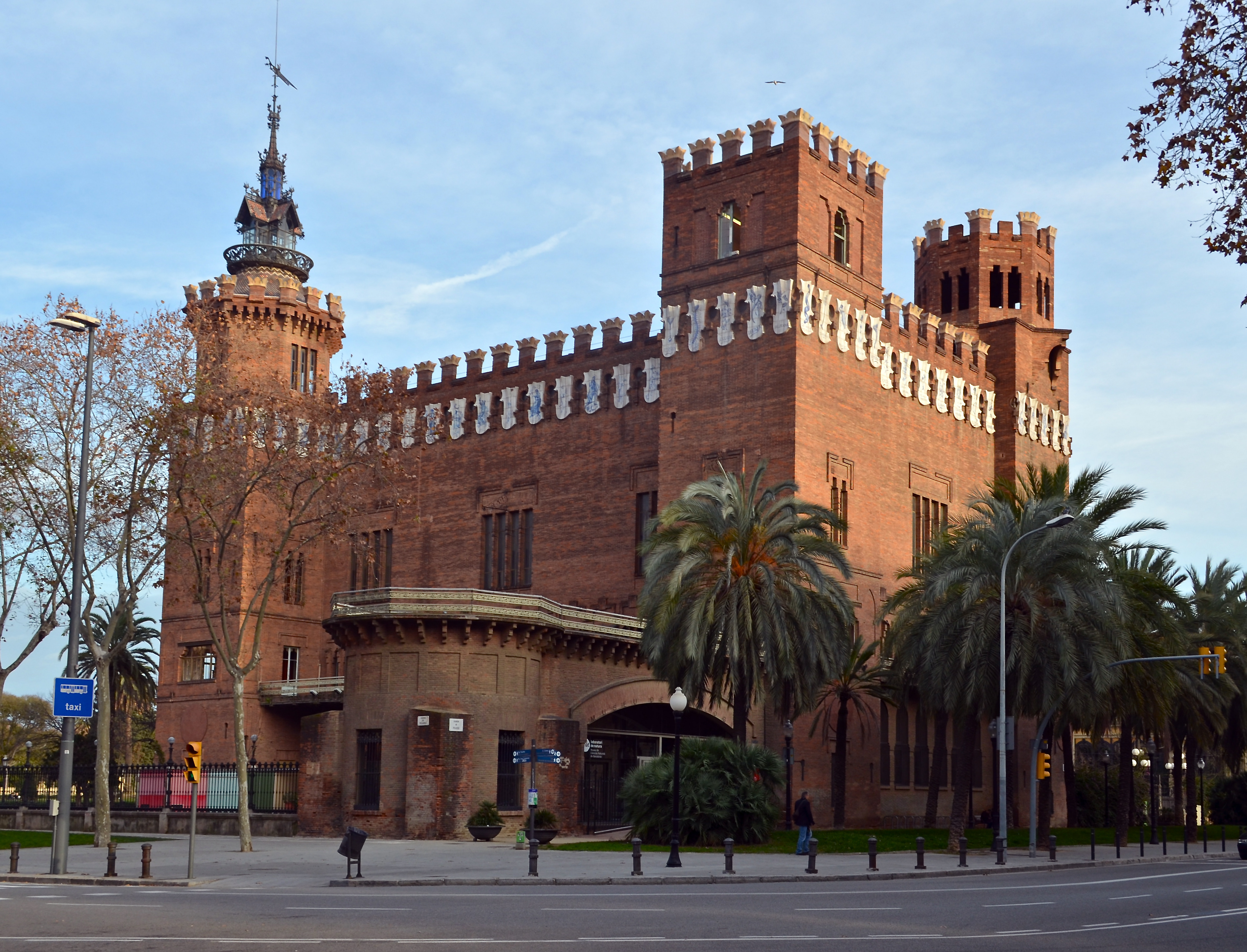
The Castle of the Three Dragons in Barcelona

The earliest example of Modernista architecture is the Castle of the Three Dragons designed by Lluís Domènech i Montaner in the Parc de la Ciutadella for the 1888 Barcelona Universal Exposition. It is a search for a particular style for Catalonia drawing on Medieval and Arab styles. Like the currents known in other countries as Art Nouveau, Jugendstil, Liberty style, Modern Style and Vienna Secession, Modernisme was closely related to the English Arts and Crafts movement and the Gothic Revival. As well as combining a rich variety of historically-derived elements, it is characterized by the predominance of the curve over the straight line, by rich decoration and detail, by the frequent use of vegetal and other organic motifs, the taste for asymmetry, a refined aestheticism and dynamic shapes. While Barcelona was the centre of Modernista construction, the Catalan industrial bourgeoisie built industrial buildings and summer residences (cases d'estiueig) in many Catalan towns, notably Terrassa and Reus. The textile factory which is now home to the Catalan national technical museum mNACTEC is an outstanding example.

Antoni Gaudí is the best-known architect of this movement. Other influential architects were Lluís Domènech i Montaner and Josep Puig i Cadafalch, and later Josep Maria Jujol, Rafael Guastavino and Enrique Nieto.

== Architects ==
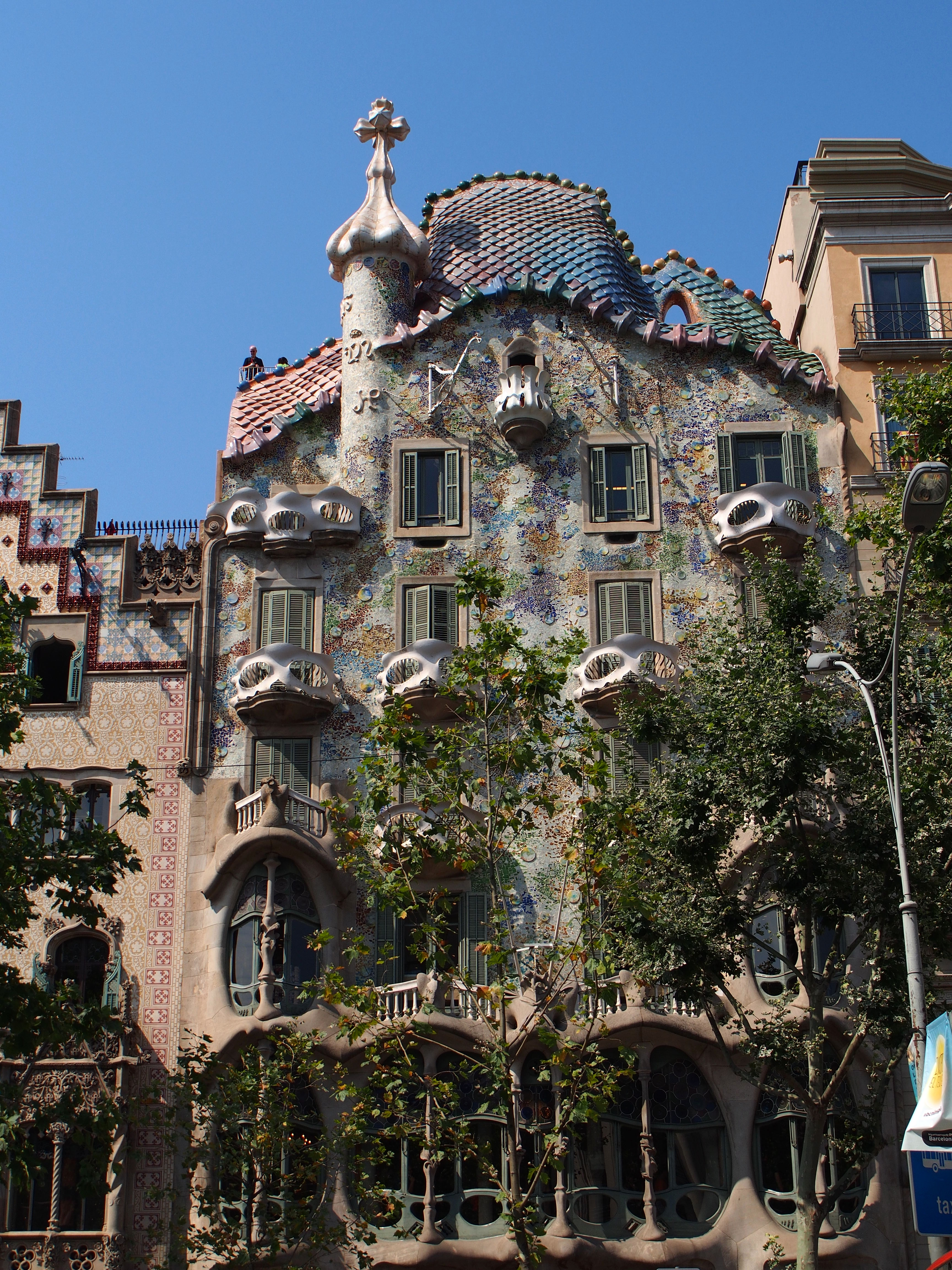
Casa Batlló by Antoni Gaudí in Barcelona

There were more than 100 architects who made buildings of the Modernista style, three of whom are particularly well known for their outstanding buildings: Antoni Gaudí, Lluís Domènech i Montaner and Josep Puig i Cadafalch.

- Antoni Gaudí, who went beyond mainstream Modernisme, creating a personal style based on observation of the nature and exploitation of traditional Catalan construction traditions. He was using regulated geometric shapes as the hyperbolic paraboloid, the hyperboloid, the helicoid and the conoide.
- Lluís Domènech i Montaner created a genuine alternative architecture. Along with Josep Vilaseca i Casanovas he worked towards a modern and international style. Domènech continued on from Viollet-le-Duc, his work characterized by a mix of constructive rationalism and ornaments inspired in the Hispano-Arab architecture as seen in the Palau de la Música Catalana, in the Hospital de Sant Pau or in the Institut Pere Mata of Reus. His Hotel Internacional at Passeig de Colom in Barcelona (demolished after the 1888 World Fair) was an early example of industrial building techniques.
- Josep Puig i Cadafalch was a Catalan architect, politician and historian who was involved in many projects to restore older buildings. One of his most well-known buildings is his rebuilding of the Casa Amatller in Passeig de Gràcia. It has elements in both the Catalan tradition and others originating in the Netherlands or the German Gothic. Neo-Gothic is also apparent in his Codorniu Winery (Caves Codorniu, 1904). He built Casa Amatller and Casa Trinxet.

=== Other architects ===
- Enric Sagnier i Villavecchia, the great builder of buildings for the bourgeoisie to the l'Eixample.
- Josep Maria Jujol i Gibert, Gaudi's collaborator, creator of the fountain of the Plaça Espanya in Barcelona, and professor of the Escola Superior d'Arquitectura.
- Cèsar Martinell i Brunet, designer of nearly 40 wineries (The Cathedrals of the Wine), and agricultural buildings throughout southern and central Catalonia.
- Josep Vilaseca i Casanovas, author of the Arc de Triomf of Barcelona (gate entrance to the Exposition of 1888) and the Casa Pia Batlló of the Rambla Catalunya, Gran Via.
- Joan Rubió i Bellver, pupil of Domènech i Montaner and disciple and assistant of Gaudí between 1893 and 1905 to the Sagrada Família, to the Casa Batlló and the Parc Güell. He built the Casa Golferichs, the Casa Pomar and the building of the Escola Industrial.
- Salvador Valeri i Pupurull
- Josep Amargós i Samaranch
- Francesc Berenguer i Mestres
- Enrique Nieto
- Rafael Guastavino from Catalan-speaking Valencia to whom Asland Cement Factory in Castellar de n'Hug is attributed
- Domènec Boada i Piera
- Cristóbal Cascante i Colom
- Ferran Cels
- Eduard Ferrés i Puig
- Josep Font i Gumà
- Josep Graner i Prat
- Jeroni Ferran Granell i Manresa
- Miquel Madorell i Rius
- Bernardí Martorell i Puig
- Rafael Masó i Valentí
- Francesc de Paula Morera i Gatell
- Lluís Muncunill i Parellada, who was active in Terrassa: created Vapor Aymerich, Amat i Jover textile factory, now hosting mNACTEC (National Museum of Science and Industry of Catalonia) and a "farmhouse"/small manor house called Masia Freixa,
- Camil Oliveras i Gensana
- Ignasi Oms i Ponsa
- Pere Caselles i Tarrats
- Josep Maria Pericas i Morros
- Josep Pujol i Brull
- Pere Ros i Tort
- Manuel Vega i March
- Salvador Vinyals

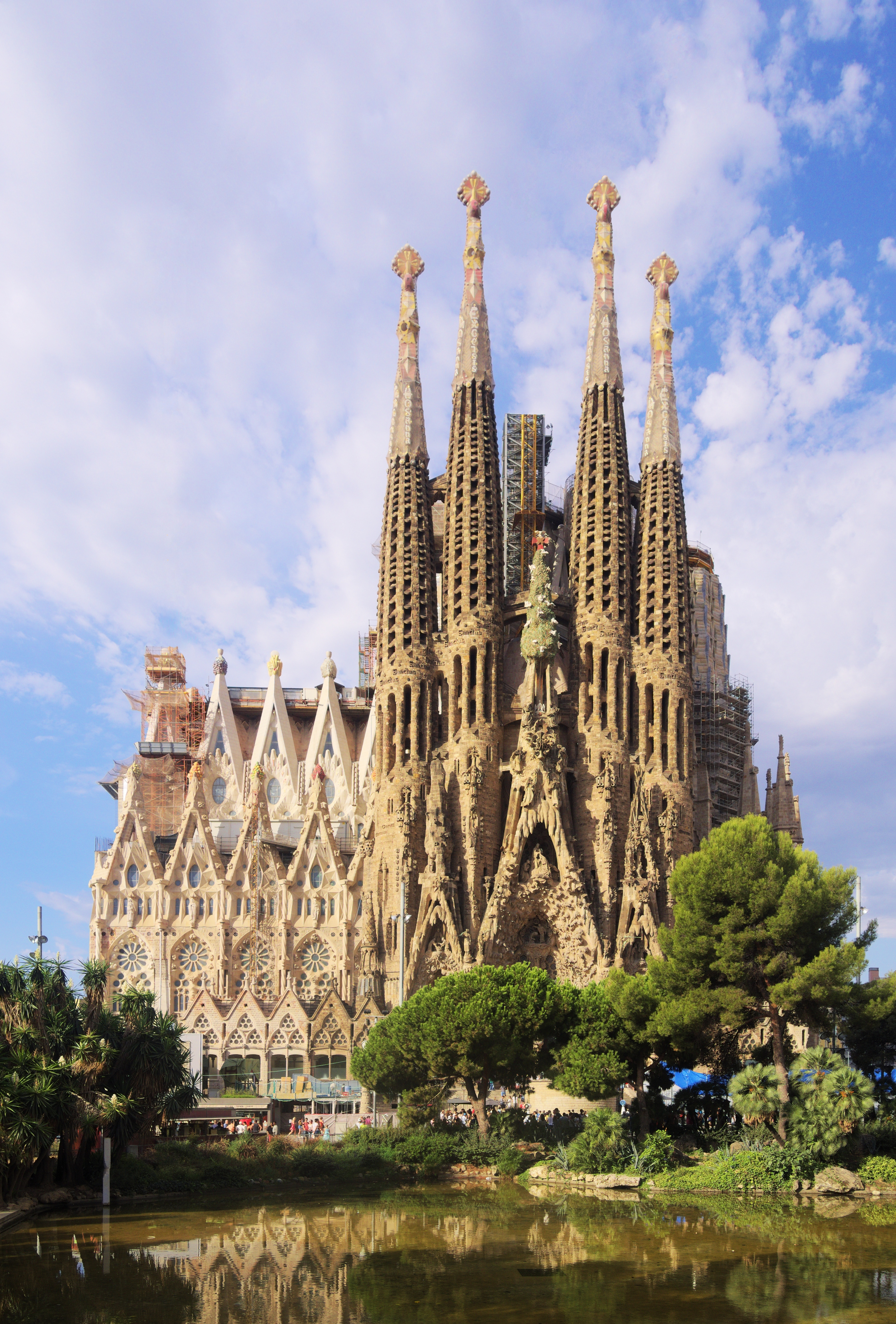
The Sagrada Família, an icon of Modernisme, by Antoni Gaudí

== UNESCO World Heritage ==
Some of the works of Catalan Modernism have been listed by UNESCO as World Cultural Heritage:

- By Antoni Gaudí:
  - Park Güell in Barcelona;
  - Palau Güell in Barcelona;
  - Sagrada Família in Barcelona;
  - Casa Batlló in Barcelona;
  - Casa Milà in Barcelona;
  - Casa Vicens in Barcelona;
  - Colònia Güell in Santa Coloma de Cervelló.
- By Lluís Domènech i Montaner:
  - Palau de la Música Catalana in Barcelona;
  - Hospital de Sant Pau in Barcelona;

== Literature ==
In literature, Modernisme stood out the most in narrative. The nouvelles and novels of decadent writers such as Prudenci Bertrana (whose highly controversial Josafat involved a demented priest who ends up killing a prostitute), Caterina Albert (also known as Víctor Catala), author of bloody, expressionistic tales of rural violence, opposed to the idealisation of nature propugned by Catalan Romantics, or Raimon Casellas have been highly influential upon later Catalan narrative, essentially recovering a genre that had been lost due to political causes since the end of the Middle Ages. Those writers often, though not always, show influences from Russian literature of the 19th century and also Gothic novels. Still, works not influenced by those sources, such as Joaquim Ruyra's slice-of-life tales of the North-Eastern Catalan coast are perhaps even more influential than that of the aforementioned authors, and Rusiñol's well-known L'auca del senyor Esteve (roughly "The Tale of Mr. Esteve"; an auca is a type of illustrated broadside, similar to a one-sheet comic book) is an ironic critique of Catalan bourgeoisie more related to ironic, pre-Realist Catalan costumisme.

In poetry, Modernisme closely follows Symbolist and Parnassian poetry, with poets frequently crossing the line between both tendencies or alternating between them. Another important strain of Modernista poetry is Joan Maragall's "Paraula viva" (Living word) school, which advocated Nietzschean vitalism and spontaneous and imperfect writing over cold and thought-over poetry. Although poetry was very popular with the Modernistes and there were many poets involved in the movement, Maragall is the only Modernista poet who is still widely read today.

Modernista theatre was also important, as it smashed the insubstantial regional plays that were popular in 19th-century Catalonia. There were two main schools of Modernista theatre: social theatre, which intended to change society and denounce injustice—the worker stories of Ignasi Iglésias, for example Els Vells ("The old ones"); the Ibsen-inspired works of Joan Puig i Ferreter, most notably Aigües Encantades ("Enchanted Waters"); Rusiñol's antimilitaristic play L'Hèroe—and symbolist theatre, which emphasised the distance between artists and the bourgeoisie—for example, Rusiñol's Cigales i Formigues ("Cicadas and Ants") or El Jardí Abandonat ("The Abandoned Garden").

== Linguistics ==
Modernista ideas impelled L'Avenç collaborator Pompeu Fabra to devise a new orthography for Catalan. However, only with the later rise of Noucentisme did his projects come to fruition and end the orthographic chaos which reigned at the time.

== Decline ==
By 1910, Modernisme had been accepted by the bourgeoisie and had pretty much turned into a fad. It was around this time that Noucentista artists started to ridicule the rebel ideas of Modernisme and propelled a more bourgeois art and a more right-of-centre version of Catalan Nationalism, which eventually rose to power with the victory of the Lliga Regionalista in 1912. Until Miguel Primo de Rivera's dictatorship suppressed all substantial public use of Catalan, Noucentisme was immensely popular in Catalonia. However, Modernisme did have a revival of sorts during the Second Spanish Republic, with avant-garde writers such as Futurist Joan-Salvat Papasseit earning comparisons to Joan Maragall, and the spirit of Surrealists such as Josep Vicent Foix or Salvador Dalí being clearly similar to the rebellion of the Modernistes, what with Dalí proclaiming that Catalan Romanticist Àngel Guimerà was a putrefact pervert. However, the ties between Catalan art from the 1930s and Modernisme are not that clear, as said artists were not consciously attempting to continue any tradition.

Modernista architecture survived longer. The Spanish city of Melilla in Northern Africa experienced an economic boom at the turn of the 20th century, and its new bourgeoisie showed its riches by massively ordering Modernista buildings. The workshops established there by Catalan architect Enrique Nieto continued producing decorations in this style even when it was out of fashion in Barcelona, which results in Melilla having, oddly enough, the second-largest concentration of Modernista works after Barcelona.

== See also ==
- List of Modernista buildings in Barcelona
- List of Gaudí buildings
