= Casa Pomar =

Apartment building in Barcelona, Spain

Coordinates: 41.3956°N 2.1703°E

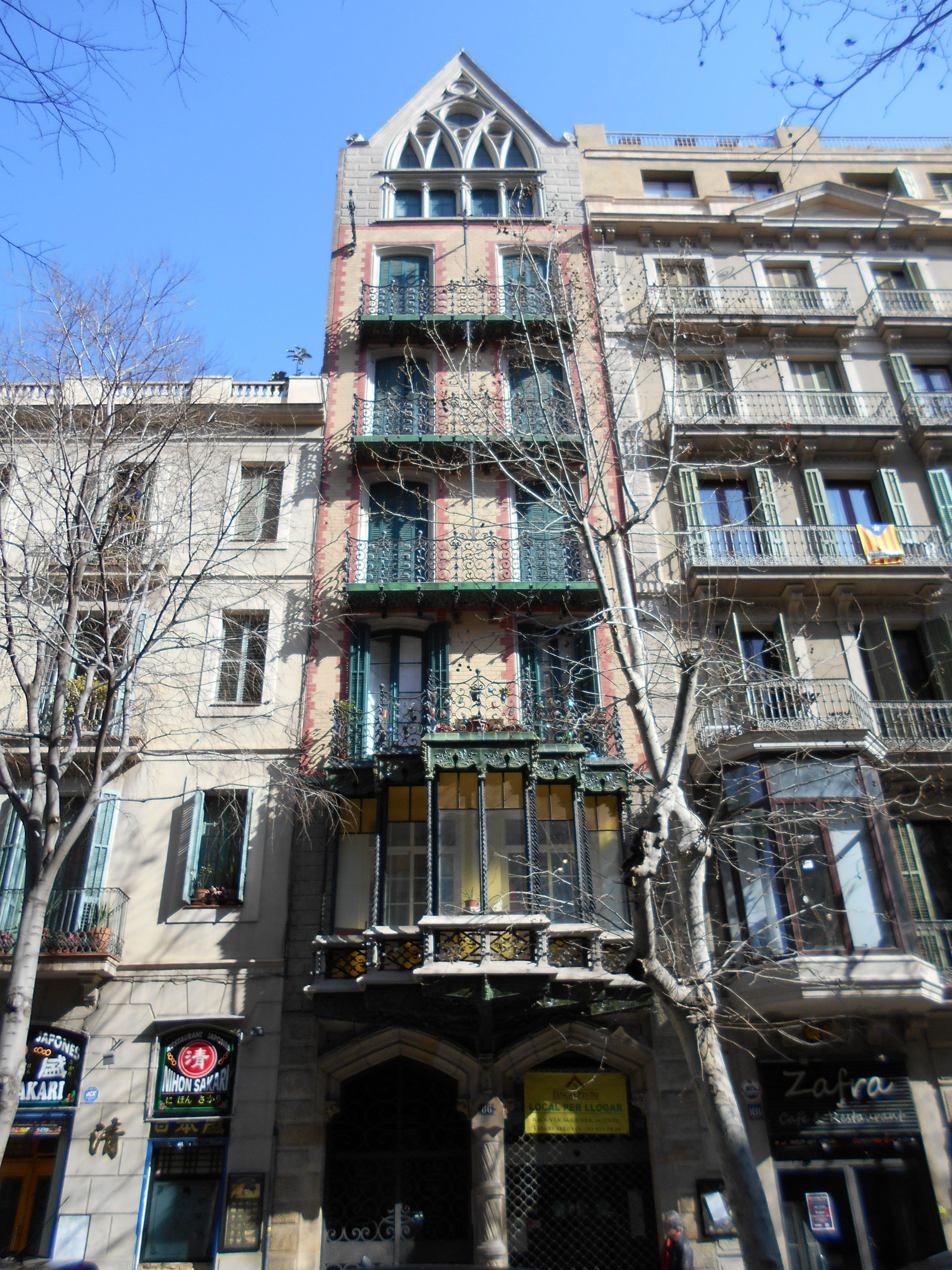
- Facade of Casa Pomar
- Interactive map of the Casa Pomar area

General information
- Architectural style: Modernisme (Catalan Art Nouveau)
- Location: Barcelona, Spain, Carrer de Girona, 86
- Construction started: 1904
- Completed: 1906

Design and construction
- Architect: Joan Rubió y Bellver
- Known for: Modernist design, neo-Gothic elements

Casa Pomar is a modernist apartment building located at number 86, Carrer de Girona, Barcelona.

The building was designed by the Catalan architect Joan Rubió y Bellver (1871–1952), a pupil of Antoni Gaudí. Construction began in 1904 and was completed in 1906.

The building has a narrow facade. There is a bow window on the first floor, above which are several balconies on upper floors. The bow window's base is constructed of green ceramic tiles and wrought iron, inspired by the neo-Gothic style.

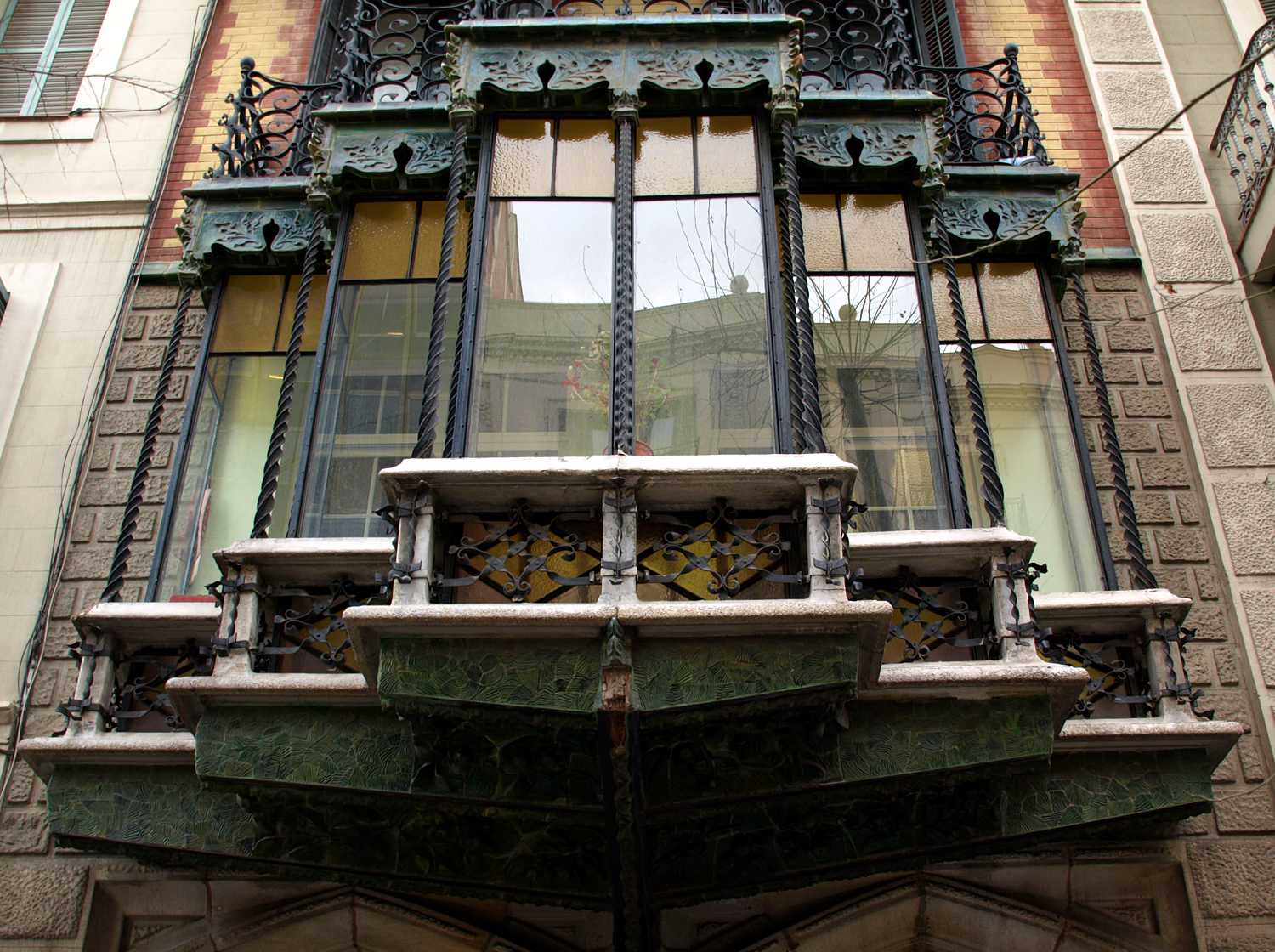
First floor bow window of Casa Pomar

== See also ==
- List of Modernisme buildings in Barcelona
