= Mustafa Arruf =

Spanish sculptor (1958–2025)

- Born: Mustafa Hamed Moh Arruf; 8 June 1958; Nador
- Died: 10 February 2025 (aged 66)
- Known for: Bronze sculpture, abstract expressionism
- Notable work: Meetings; Torso

Signature
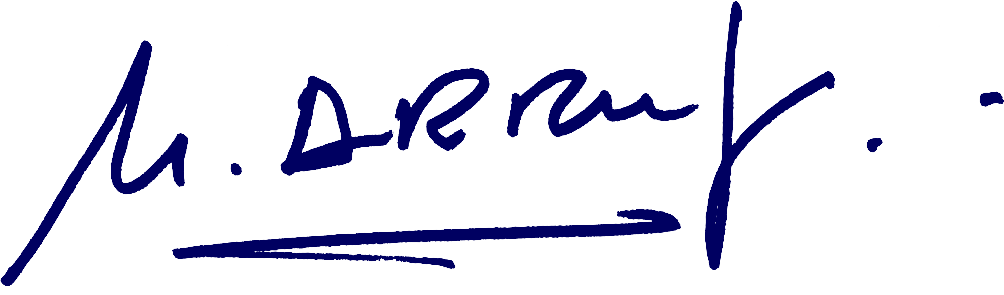

Mustafa Hamed Moh Arruf (8 June 1958 – 10 February 2025) was a Spanish sculptor.

== Life and career ==
Mustafa Hamed Moh Arruf, was born in Nador, in 1958. He began his artistic studies at the School of Applied Arts and Artistic Trades in Melilla and continued his training in Fine Arts in the city of Granada (Spain). His early vocation is painting and sculpture and, although he worked with materials such as wood, stone (in Holland), and bronze, it is with this material that he best expressed his art.

In the mid 1980s, he moved to Germany, where he performed various works presented at the House of Spain in Frankfurt. After a brief residency in Holland, he moved to Madrid, in the nineties, an artistically very productive period, and worked with the MAGISA Bronze Foundry and the Art Gallery Series. Later he worked in the public program of Taller Schools and Oficio Houses, where he performed different teaching tasks, until he obtained a position as a restorer in the Archaeological Museum of the city of Melilla.

As the whole of his work, his urban sculpture —which is exhibited in squares, streets, avenues, parks and gardens of different countries— and public —which is exhibited in centers of different administrations— presents an important diversity, in which Artistic (ornamental) elements are combined with expressive (conceptual) elements.

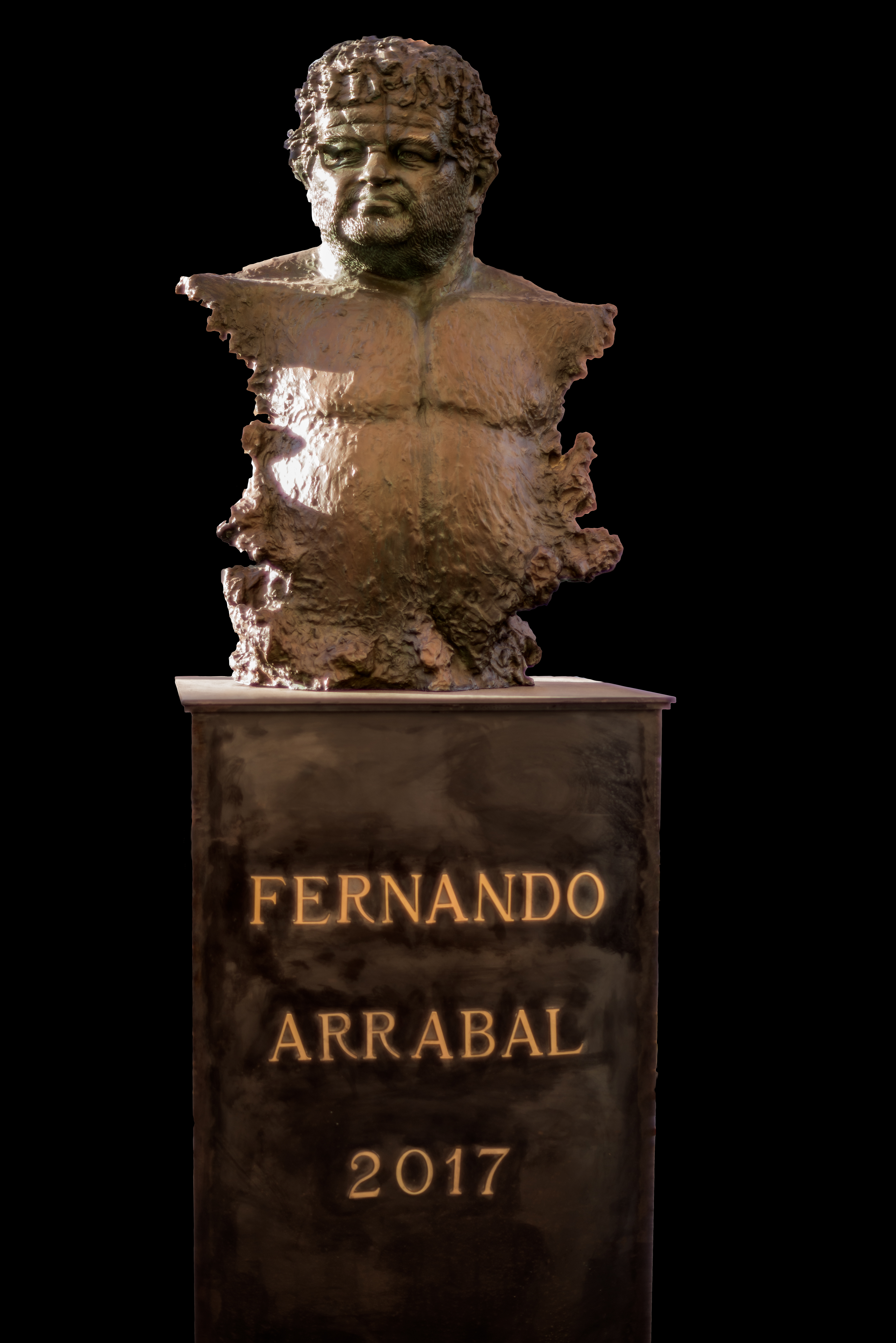
Homage to Fernando Arrabal, 1994

A group of his works —promoted by public or private institutions, and made from his beginnings as a sculptor, in 1985, until today— the form busts or statues of famous people born or linked to his hometown: to teaching (Juan Caro Romero, 1985), to painting (Victorio Manchón, 1994), to the letters and theatrical representation (the playwright Fernando Arrabal, 1994, the poet Miguel Fernández, 1994, and the actor and theater director Antonio César Jiménez Segura, 2007), and architecture (Enrique Nieto, 2008). Another grouping forms more avant-garde sculptures, with strong contrasts in its design: flat/ volume, soft/rough, hard/soft and, above all, diagonal/circular, with quarters of moon that makes his works contain a dynamic balance and tension.

In 1997 he won the contest that the Autonomous City of Melilla had convened for the commemoration of the V Centennial of his Spanish foundation with the work Encuentros, his most monumental and popular sculpture, although not the most successful in the opinion of its creator. A replica of half of it is in the Juan Carlos I Park, in Madrid, at the foot of which there is transcribed a sonnet by Fernando Arrabal.

Another replica of the other half is in the Park of the Three Cultures, in the city of Toledo.

The sculptor —aware that an author should not interpret his work since the composition in the art of occupying the space depends, more than in any other discipline, on the point of view— makes an exception here with limitations:

Encounters means union of cultures, of continents, of people. It is the embrace of continents and cultures. The word "Encuentros" is very significant. This type of sculptures allows many interpretations because the mind is free. I put "Encuentros" as I could have put something else, but philosophy is the union of cultures, of Mother Earth.

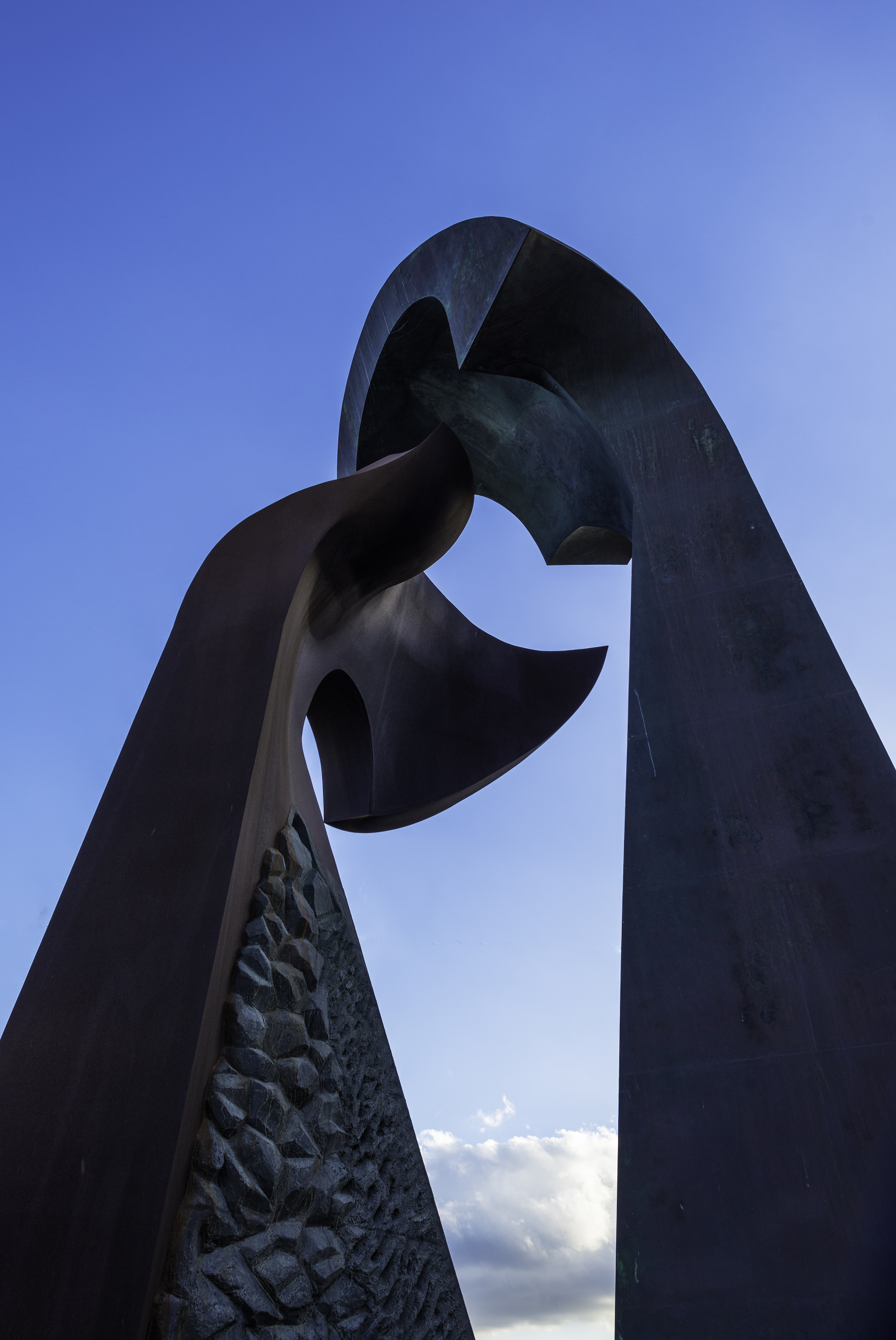
Meetings. (Melilla, 1997)

In 2002 he developed a group of female sculptures, promoted by the Consejería de Obras Públicas of Melilla, which that year had decided to allocate one percent of the budget in culture for embellishment of the city. These are works with figurative aesthetic ascription, with geometric formulation and predominance in spiral rotation.

Arruf died on 10 February 2025, at the age of 66.

== Works ==
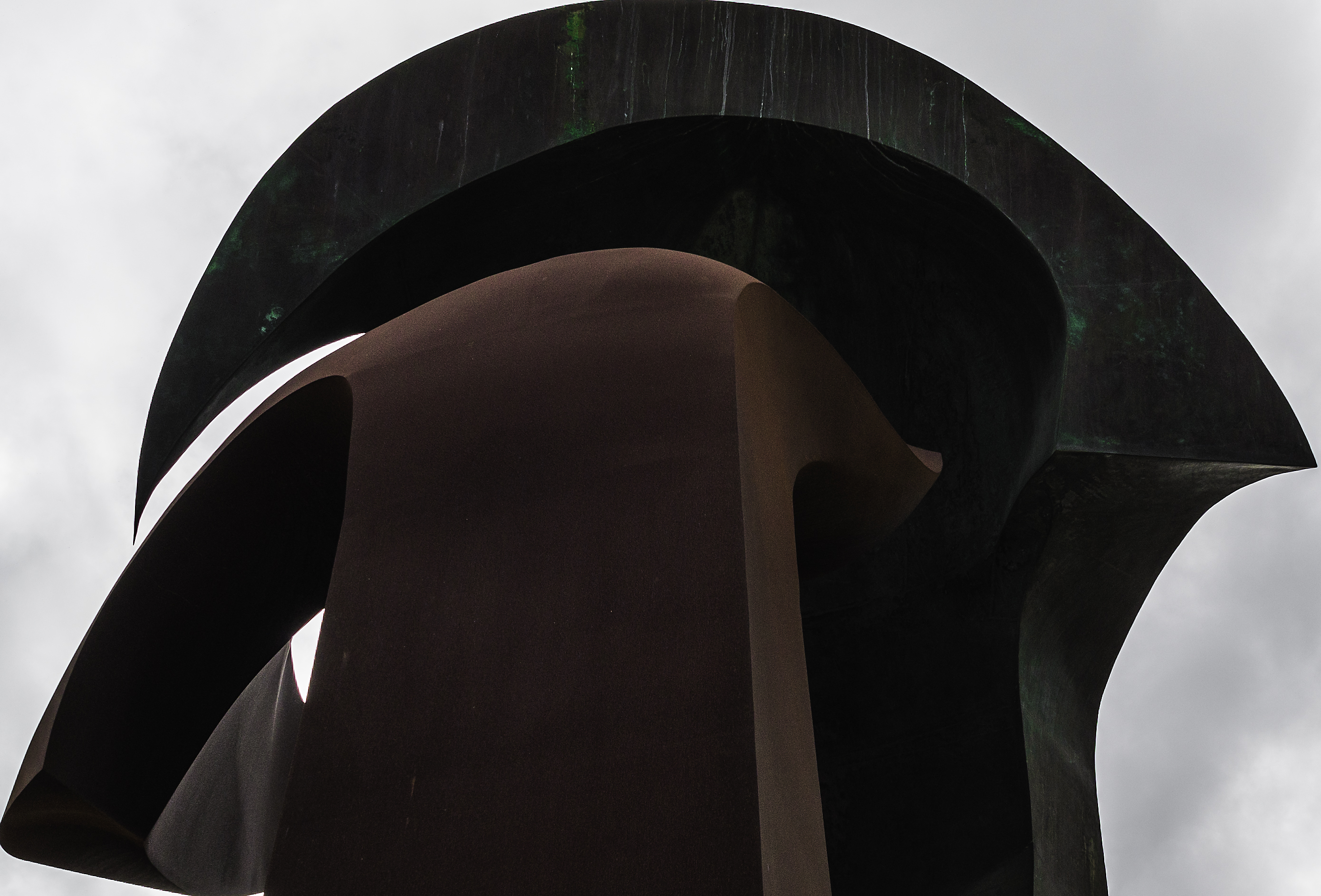
Meetings (1997)

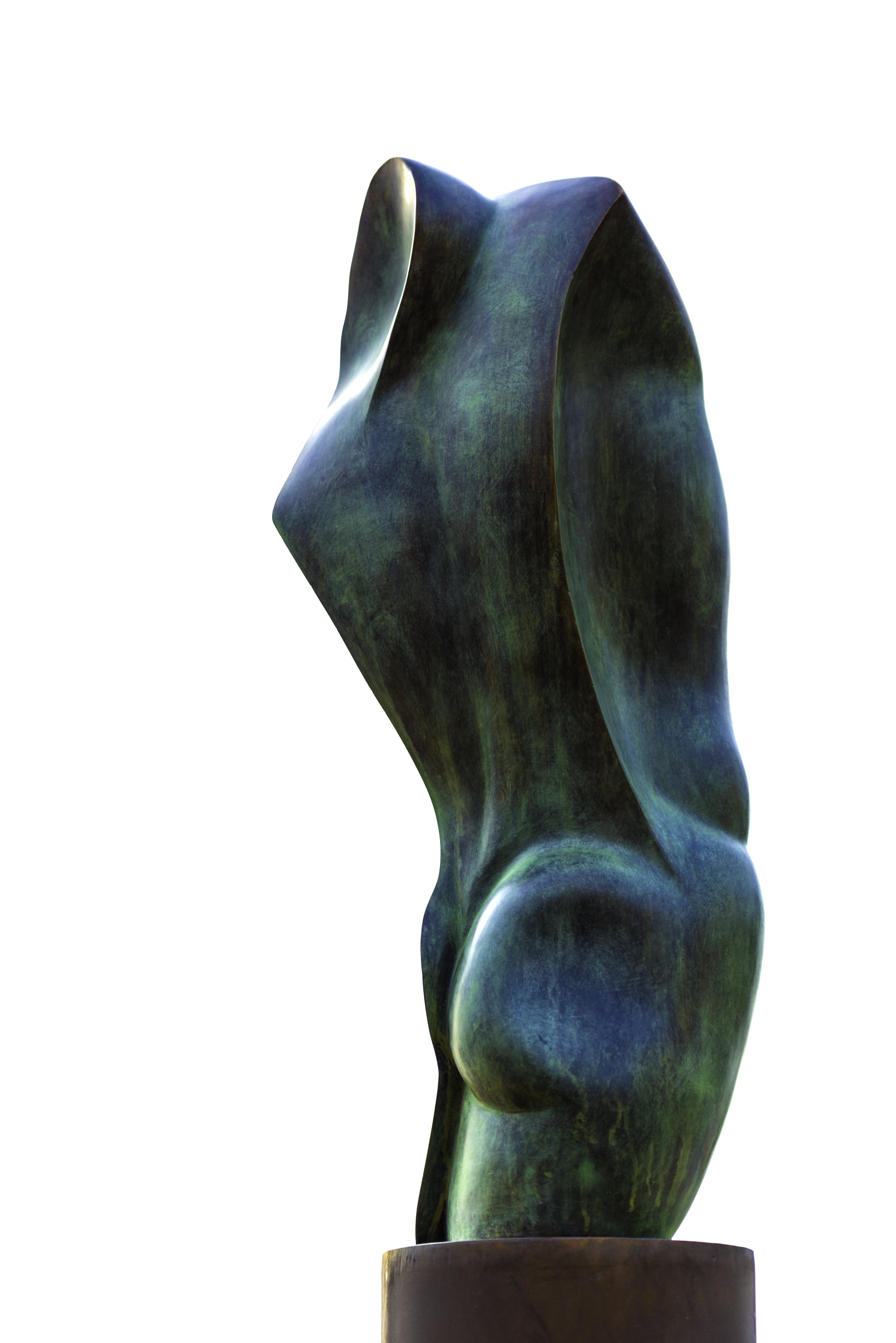
Torso (Melilla, 2002)

- 1985: Bust devoted to Juan Caro. Public School Juan Caro (Melilla). Materials:Bronze. Height: 1.60 metres.
- 1988: Ambro Bank. Amsterdam (Netherlands). High relief in stone.
- 1991: Bust devoted to Victorio Manchón. U.N.E.D. (National Distance Education University) Exhibition Hall. Melilla. Materials used: Bronze. Height: 1.67 metres.
- 1992: `Torso´. Melilla. Material: Bronze. Height: 1.70 metres.
- 1993: Monument devoted to Miguel Fernández (Melilla). Materials used: Bronze. Height: 2.00 metres.
- 1994: Bust devoted to Fernando Arrabal. Materials used: Bronze and weathering steel. Melilla
- 1997: `Torso outside the Park of the Museum of Modern Art in Tromso (Norway). ´. Material used: Bronze. Height: 1.70 metres.
- 1997: Monument named `Encuentro´. Melilla. Materials: Bronze and weathering steel. Height 12 and 10 metres.
- 1997: Monument named `Encuentro´ at the Juan Carlos I Park at the Field of Nations (Campo de las Naciones) (Madrid). Material: Bronze. Height: 12 metres.
- 1997: Bust devoted to General Cabanillas. Material used: Bronze.
- 1998: `Torso´. Torrejon de Ardoz (Madrid). Material used: Bronze. Height: 1.70 metres.
- 1999: Monument `Encuentros´. Location: Melilla. Material used: Weathering steel. Height: 3 metres.
- 2002: Bust devoted to the Lieutenant Legionnaire Aguilar (Melilla). Material: Bronze. Height: 3 metres.
- 2003: Ten sculptures made of bronze located in Paseo Maritimo Francisco Mir Berlanga (Melilla).
- 2007: Monument devoted to the theatre director Cesar Jimenez. Material used: Bronze.
- 2008: Project-Monument devoted to Pablo Ruiz Picasso (Malaga).
- 2009: Monument devoted to Enrique Nieto (Spanish architect) – Melilla.
- 2013: The monument devoted to Pedro de Estopiñan is restored – Melilla.

Works in public areas:

- Ámsterdam (Netherlands)
- Berlín (Germany)
- Huelva (Spain)
- Madrid (Spain)
- Melilla (Spain)
- Toledo (Spain)
- Torrejón de Ardoz, Madrid (Spain)
- Tromsø (Norway)

== Exhibitions ==
- 1997: Melilla´s International Film Week Award. Sculpture `Encuentros´.
- 1997: Collective Exhibition. Art Gallery Serie (Madrid).
- 1997: International Fair of Modern Art (Estampa, Madrid).
- 1997: International Film Week Award. City of Melilla Award. Sculpture `Encuentros´.
- 1998: Collective exhibition named `Fernando Arrabal Espace´. Villa San Carlo Borromeo. Milan. Italy.
- 1999: Collective exhibition with Fernando Arrabal (Valencia, Alicante, Zaragoza, Madrid, Lisboa) with national and foreign artists.
- 1999: Melilla´s Nautical Week Award. Fifth Centenary [V Centenario] Award.
- 2000: Art Gallery Serie. Collective exhibition.
- 2000: Collective exhibition with Fernando Arrabal in Paris at Bayoux Museum with national ant foreign artists.
- 2000: First Melilla's Nautical Week (Semana Nautica Ciudad de Melilla) Award.
- 2004: Collective exhibition Forum 2004 (Barcelona).
- 2006: Diario Sur [Malaga's newspaper] Sculpture Award (Malaga).
- 2006 Melilla Sefarad, Fundación Gaselec, Melilla.
- 2012: Homage to Dounia Oualit. Individual exhibition sponsored by the Honorable City Hall of Rabat and the Foundation C.D.G. (Morocco).

== Awards and distinctions ==
- Second National Prize in the Sculpture Biennial of Castellón (with his work "Mother") (1981).
- The Autonomous City of Melilla dedicates a street (2003).
