= Lluís Muncunill i Parellada =

Catalan architect

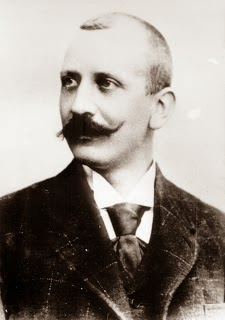
- Lluís Muncunill
- Born: Lluis Muncunill; 1868; Fonollosa
- Died: 1931 (aged 62–63); Terrassa
- Occupation: architect
- Known for: Modernisme Architect
- Notable work: Masia Freixa

Lluís Muncunill i Parellada (25 February 1868 in Sant Vicenç de Fals, Fonollosa (Province of Barcelona) – 25 April 1931 in Terrassa, Province of Barcelona), was a Catalan architect involved in the Modernisme català movement.

After earning his degree in 1892, he worked in the city of Terrassa for 40 years, designing numerous buildings of various types, including public, religious, industrial and residential. Between 1892 and 1903, he served as the municipal architect. He was influenced by other modernist architects such as Antoni Gaudí and Lluís Domènech i Montaner.

== Selected works ==
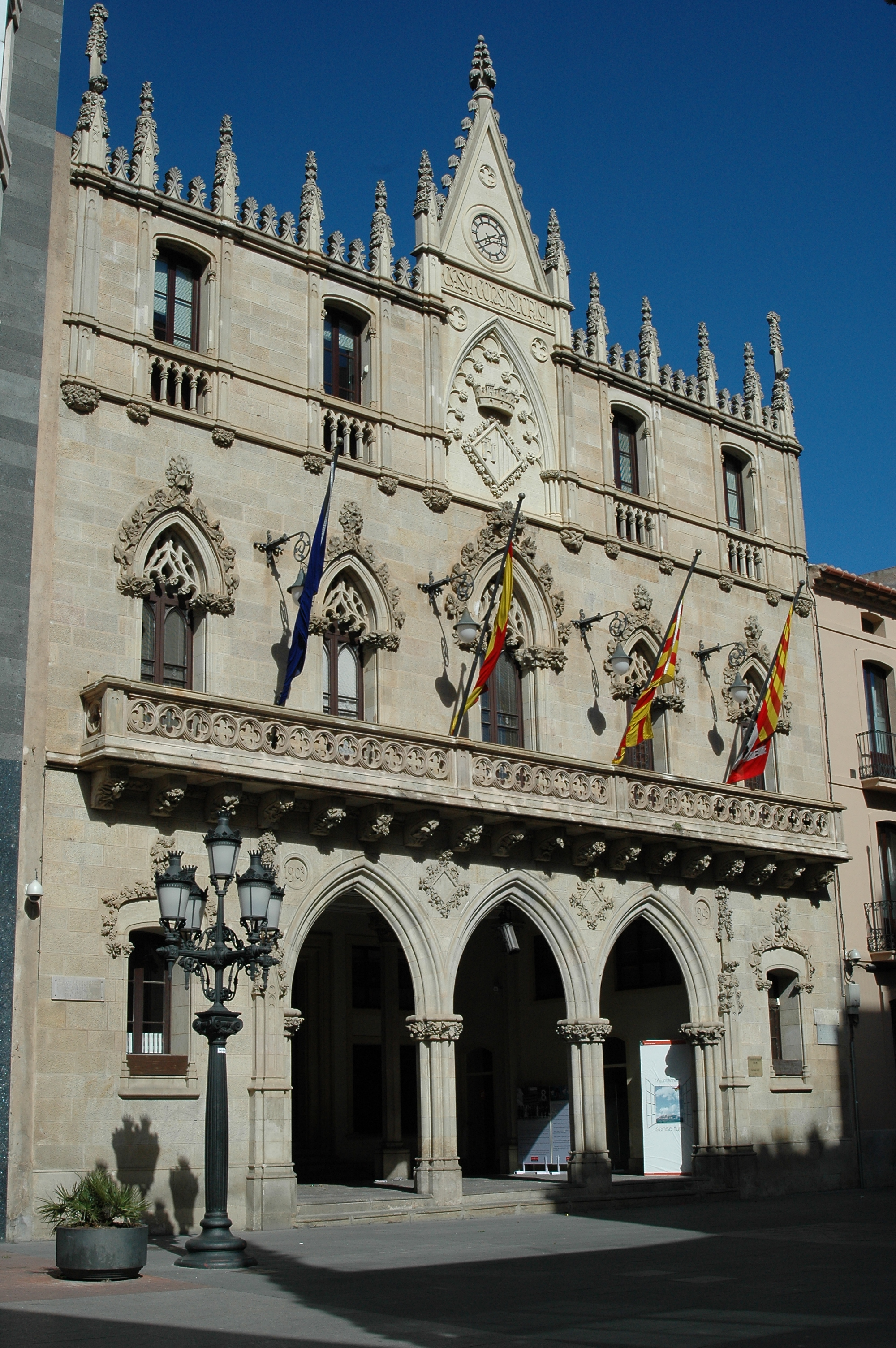
Town hall of Terrassa

Selected works include:

- Town hall of Terrassa (1900-1902)
- Masia Freixa (1907-1910)
- Dyeing hall of Izard factory (1921)
- Joan Barata house (1905)
- Hotel Peninsular (1903)
- Emili Matalonga house and warehouse (1904)
- Baltasar Gorina house (1902)
- Sociedad General de Electricidad (1908)
- Joaquim Alegre warehouse (1904)
- Condicionamiento Tarrasense (1915-1917)
- Marcet i Poal warehouse (1920)
- Pere Font Batallé factory (1916)
- Gran Casino del Foment de Terrassa (1920)
- Palau d'Indústries (1901)
