= Auca (cartoon) =

Visual story genre developed in Catalonia

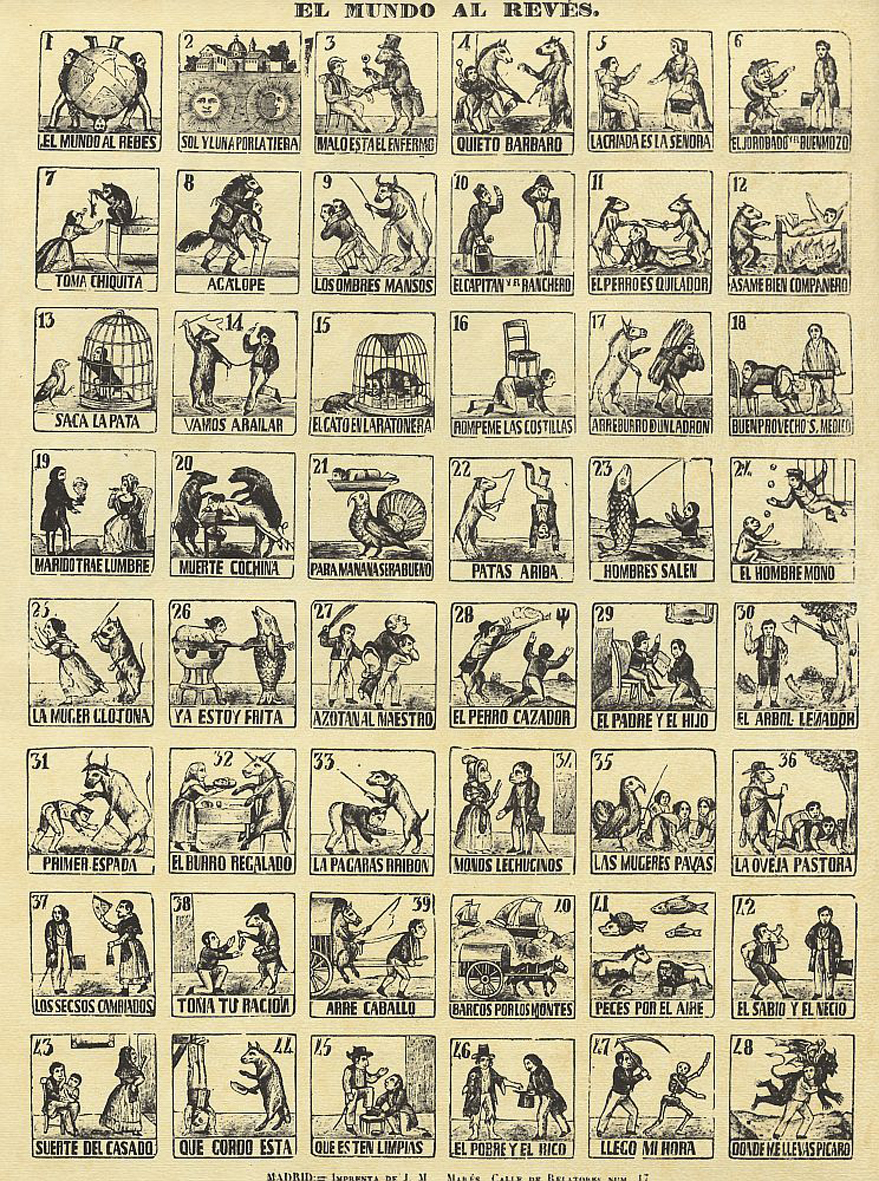
The world upside down – a 19th-century Spanish language auca from the print shop of J. M. Marés in Madrid. A poor man gives alms to a rich man, men are grazing supervised by sheep, etc.

An auca (Catalan pronunciation: [ˈawkə]) is a genre of a story in pictures developed mainly in Catalonia.

== Description ==
The auca was present in some other parts of Spain, even though it was most popular in Catalonia. It has a structure somewhat similar to comics, but has more rigid. The auca has a number of images that can be evenly divided by 4 (usually 48), all images are of the same size, all fit on one page, and there is a small piece of text, called rodolí (pronounced [ruðuˈli], plural rodolins) - underneath every image, usually in the Catalan language and since the 19th century also rhymed.

== History ==
The auca began as a card game played for money. The cards were possibly also used for divination, judging by the images that initially appeared on them: the Moon, the Sun, stars and animals, among them a goose, which gave its name to the game. (Auca means "goose" in the north-western dialects of Catalan; it is oca in modern standard Catalan.) The earliest preserved auca was created by Pere Abadal in 1670 in Moià. The game was forbidden throughout the 17th and 18th centuries and gradually the auca developed into an art form in which all the images appeared on one page and had a unifying theme, initially - arts, crafts, children's games and animals.

In the 19th century the auca reached its artistic peak and developed into a complete art form and publishing niche. The themes of auca stories became more varied and included history, biography, traditional moral stories and fables. It was then that text underneath the images took the form of two rhymed lines. The most important auca artists of that time were Josep Piferrer and Ignasi Estivill from Barcelona and Agustí Laborda and Ildefons Mompié from Valencia.

The auca structure also inspired Santiago Rusiñol's play L'auca del senyor Esteve (Mr. Esteve's auca), a down-to-earth, often humorous, story about a business-oriented family who suddenly has to deal with the artistic orientation of the young heir.

Towards the end of the 19th century the auca genre began to wane. Many new aucas were simply repeating older themes. At that time, however, aucas were brought to Madrid, where they were positively met. A series of Castilian aucas called Aleluya (Hallelujah) were produced with themes of Catholic holidays.

In the 20th century the auca continued to be a unique Catalan way of expression. Newer aucas are being regularly produced by Catalan artists, incorporating newer artistic styles, but keeping the established form of 48 images with two or four lines of rhymed text.

The cards may also have been used for divination.

This is suggested by the images originally depicted on them.

The auca gradually developed into an art form.

The initial themes included arts, crafts, children's games, and animals.

In the 19th century, the auca reached its artistic peak.

During this period, aucas were introduced to Madrid, where they were well received.

Catalan artists continue to produce new aucas regularly.

== Examples of aucas ==
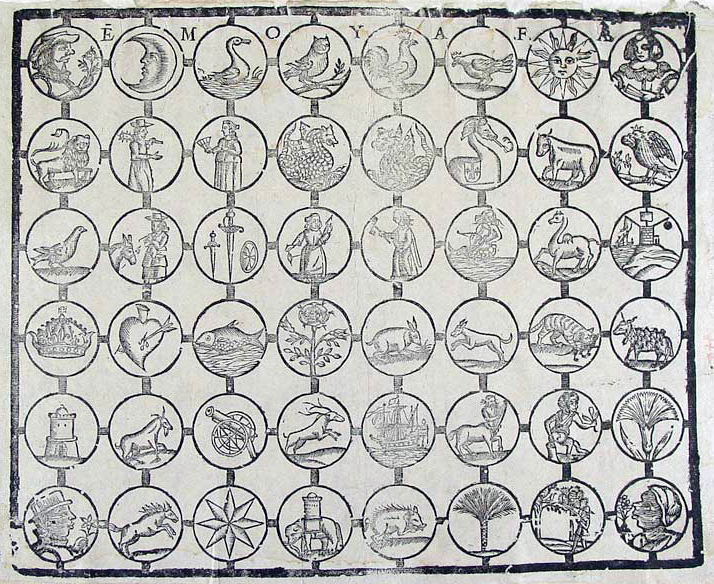
The Auca of the Sun and the Moon, Pere Abadal, 1676

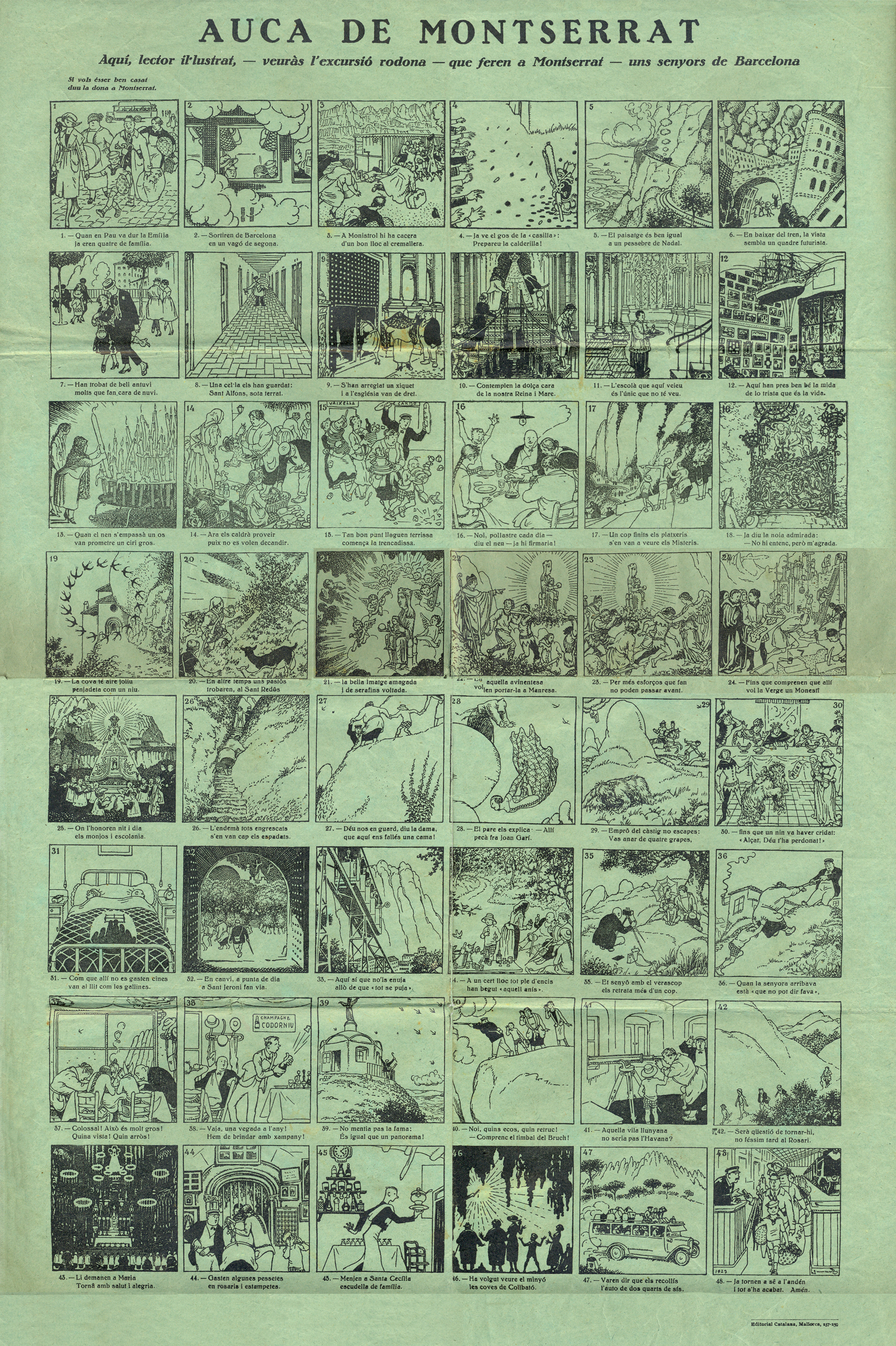
The Auca of Montserrat, 1923 - A 20th century auca with two-line rhymed rodolins.

== Bibliography ==
- La Revue des revues. Maison des sciences de l'homme. 1988.
- Albert-Ilorca, Dominique (1988). L'imagerie catalane, lectures et rituels, catalogue de l'exposition de Carcassonne, Paris, Perpignan, Toulouse, Montpellier, Barcelone. GARAE-HESIODE. ISBN 9782906156135.

== See also ==
- Traditions of Catalonia
- Seny
