= L'auca del senyor Esteve =

Novel by Santiago Rusiñol

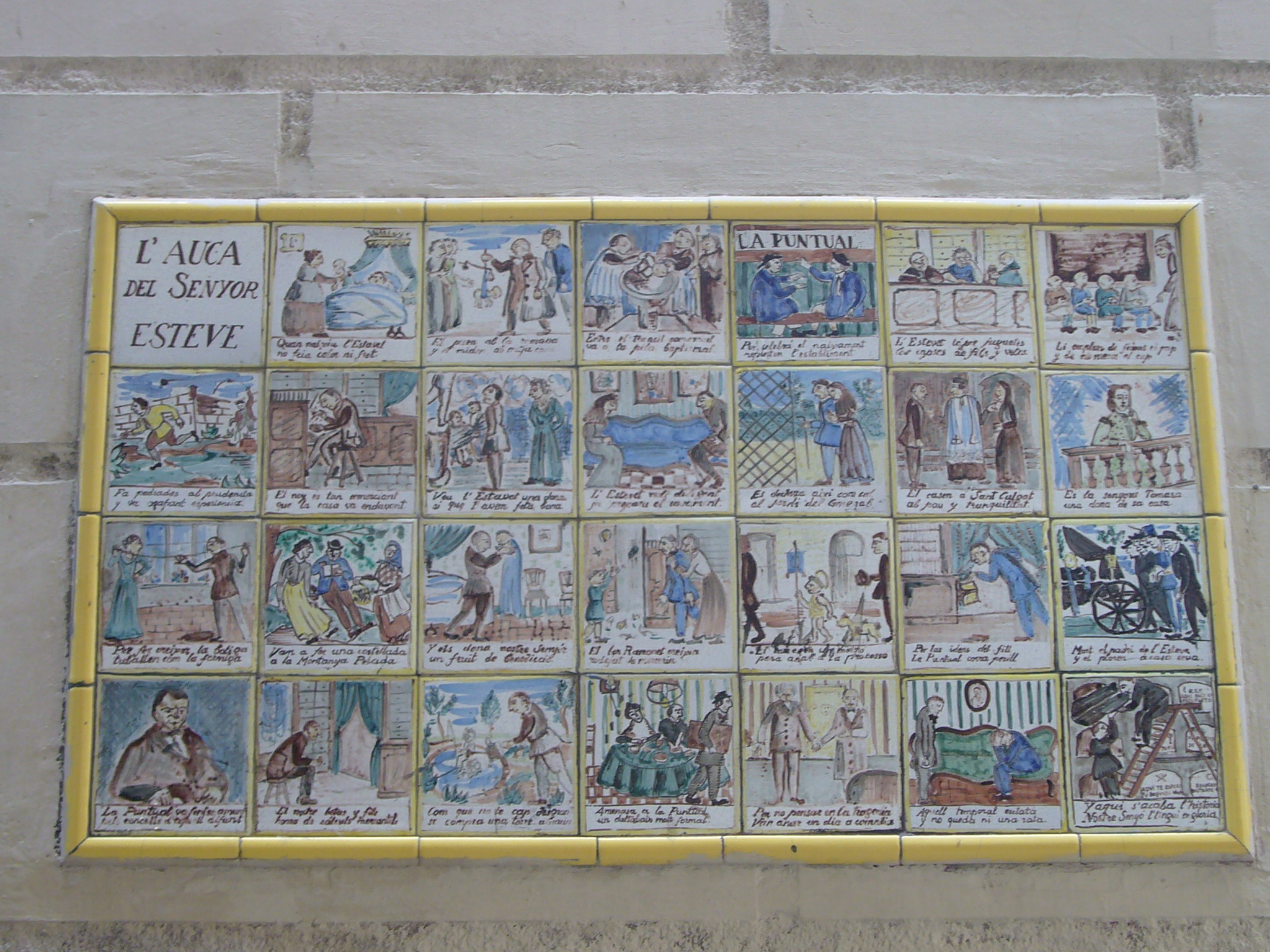
An auca representing the novel's plot on a wall in Petritxol street in Barcelona

L'auca del senyor Esteve is a novel by Santiago Rusiñol published in 1907, of which there is a theatrical version. On 12 May 1917, the theatrical version of this novel is first played in Teatre Victòria, Barcelona (Catalonia).

== Characteristics ==
L'auca del senyor Esteve is the result of the fusion between the customs of people in the 19th century and the auca, a Catalan style of story in pictures. It has 27 chapters about scenes and moments in the Ribera neighbourhood in Barcelona, which are interpreted by the 27 illustrations by Ramon Casas and the 27 rhymes by Gabriel Alomar. This novel lets Rusiñol expose the new orientation and relationships there were in those times.

== Structure and plot ==
The 27 chapters of the novel are structured in 3 parts: the first part describes the birth, childhood, learning and marriage of Esteve; the second part presents us Esteve as a good model of a shopkeeper and that's the reason there's a conflict afterwards with Ramonet, the son who wants to be an artist and not be part of the shop management; the third part is the reconciliation between the artist and the social class he belongs to.

== Subject ==
L'auca del senyor Esteve is an Art Nouveau novel. The setting shows the characteristics of that society in those times.
