= Enrique Nieto (architect) =

Spanish architect

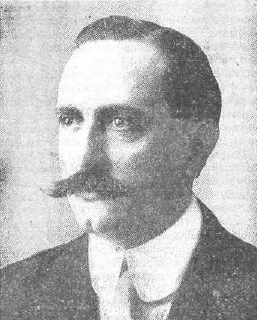
- Born: October 6, 1883
- Died: January 20, 1954 (aged 70)
- Occupation: Architect

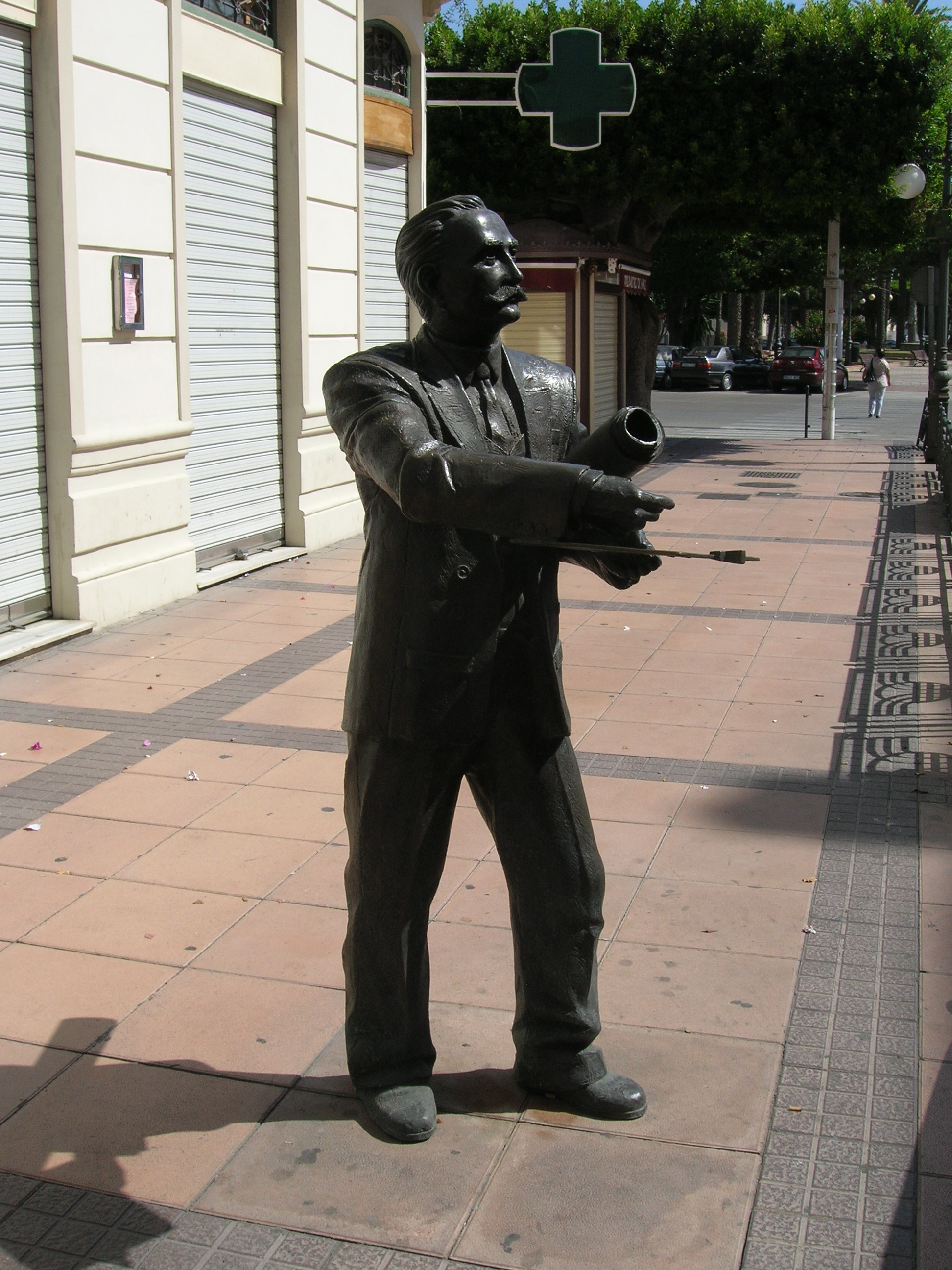
Statue of Enrique Nieto in Melilla (Work of Mustafa Arruf)

Enrique Nieto y Nieto (October 6, 1880 or 1883 – January 20, 1954) was a Spanish architect known for his Modernisme style (not to be confused with modernism), which he continued to receive commissions to design even after it fell out of favor. He was a student of Antoni Gaudí and followed his master's style when he designed noted projects in Barcelona and Melilla. In 1939, he was appointed city architect of Melilla, a Spanish enclave in North Africa. Mellila's collection of modernisme-style buildings constitutes the second largest concentration of representatives of the style outside of Barcelona.

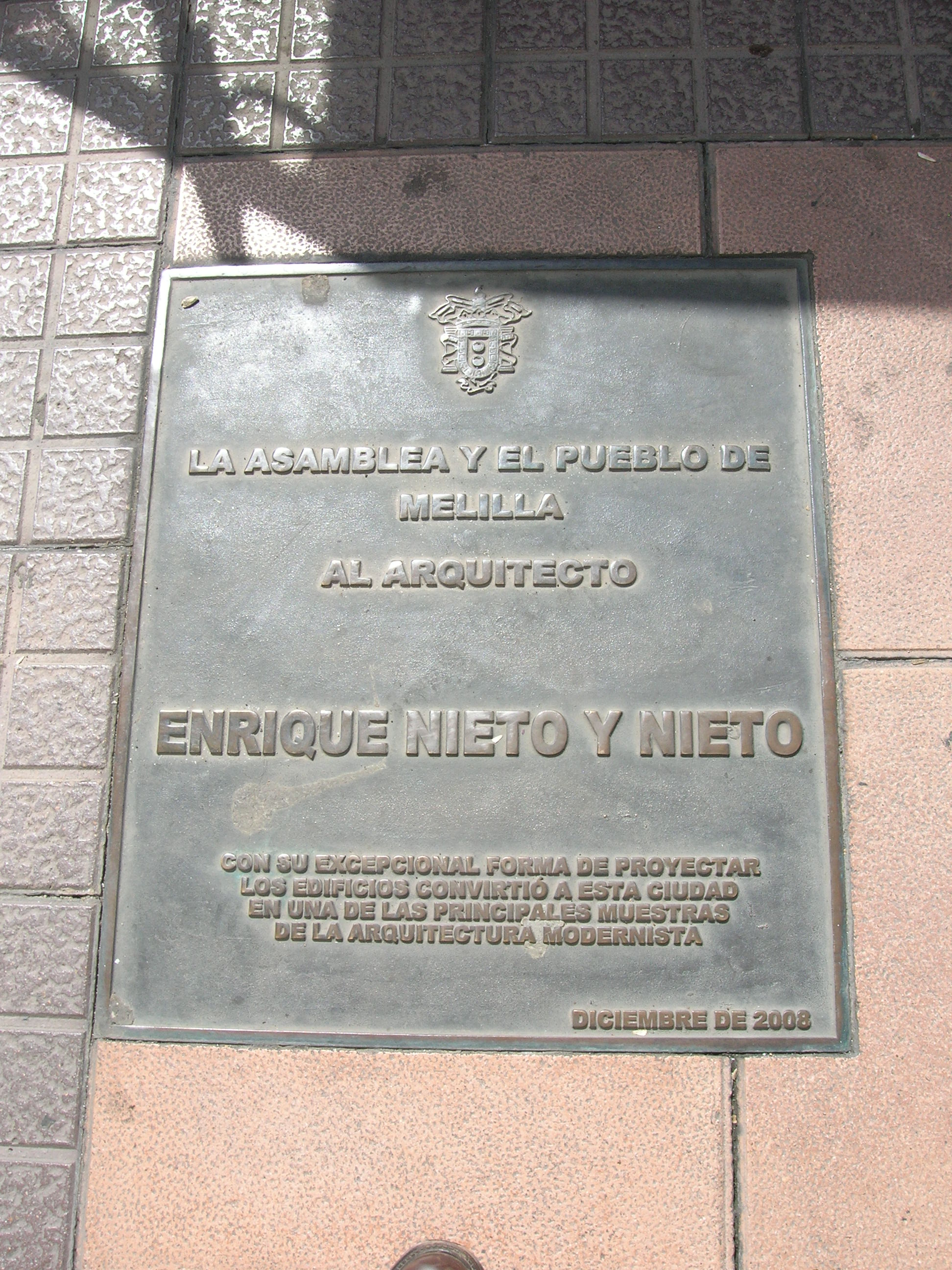
Plaque marking the dedication of the statue of Enrique Nieto in Melilla

== Places of worship ==
Nieto designed the main synagogue, Or Zaruah (or Holy Light) synagogue in 1924, the Central Mosque, and several buildings for the Catholic Church in Melilla.

== Other buildings ==
Art Nouveau was the driving force of Melilla's architecture during the first half of the 20th century. Brought to Melilla by Enrique Nieto, the style is deeply rooted in a city which was overcome with floral ornamentation. From that moment on, Melilla promoted a style that managed to take root and progress, changing all that had been built in the city before. Plants, flowers, animals and women's faces filled the Art Nouveau façades, in which the brown and cream colour ranges brought out the ornaments. Nieto is cited for receiving design inspiration from the noted Mezquita de Córdoba (Cordoba mosque).

His notable work also includes the La Reconquista and Palacio Municipal (later renamed Autonomous City Palace) in Plaza de Europa. Nieto designed the National Theatre and Cinema building in Melilla in the 1920s which has a more geometrical style than most modernisme designs.

He retired in 1949 and died of a heart attack five years later.

== Selected works ==
- C/ García Cabrelles, 1 y 3 (1928)
- C/ General Prim, 7, 9, 10, 12, 16, 20 (1909–1910)
- Cine Nacional (1929)
- Avenida Juan Carlos I, 1 (1915–1916)
- Edificio "La Reconquista", Plaza Menéndez Pelayo, s/n (1915)
- Edificio "El Acueducto", c/ Reyes Católicos, 2 (1928)
- Casa de Tortosa o antiguo Economato Militar (1914)
- Casino Militar (1932)
- Sinagoga Yamín Benarroch, c/ López Moreno (1924)
- C/ López Moreno, 2, 14 y 20 (1924, 1923 y 1928)
- Palacio de la Asamblea (1933–1948)
- Edificio de "El Telegrama del Rif" (1912)
- Cámara de Comercio, c/ Cervantes, 7 (1913)
- Mezquita Central (1945)
- Avenida de la Democracia, 8
- Mercado del Real (1932)
- C/ Cardenal Cisneros, 2 (1935)
- C/ Cándido Lobera, 2 y 4 (1933–1935)
- Monumento a los Héroes de España (1941)

== Gallery ==
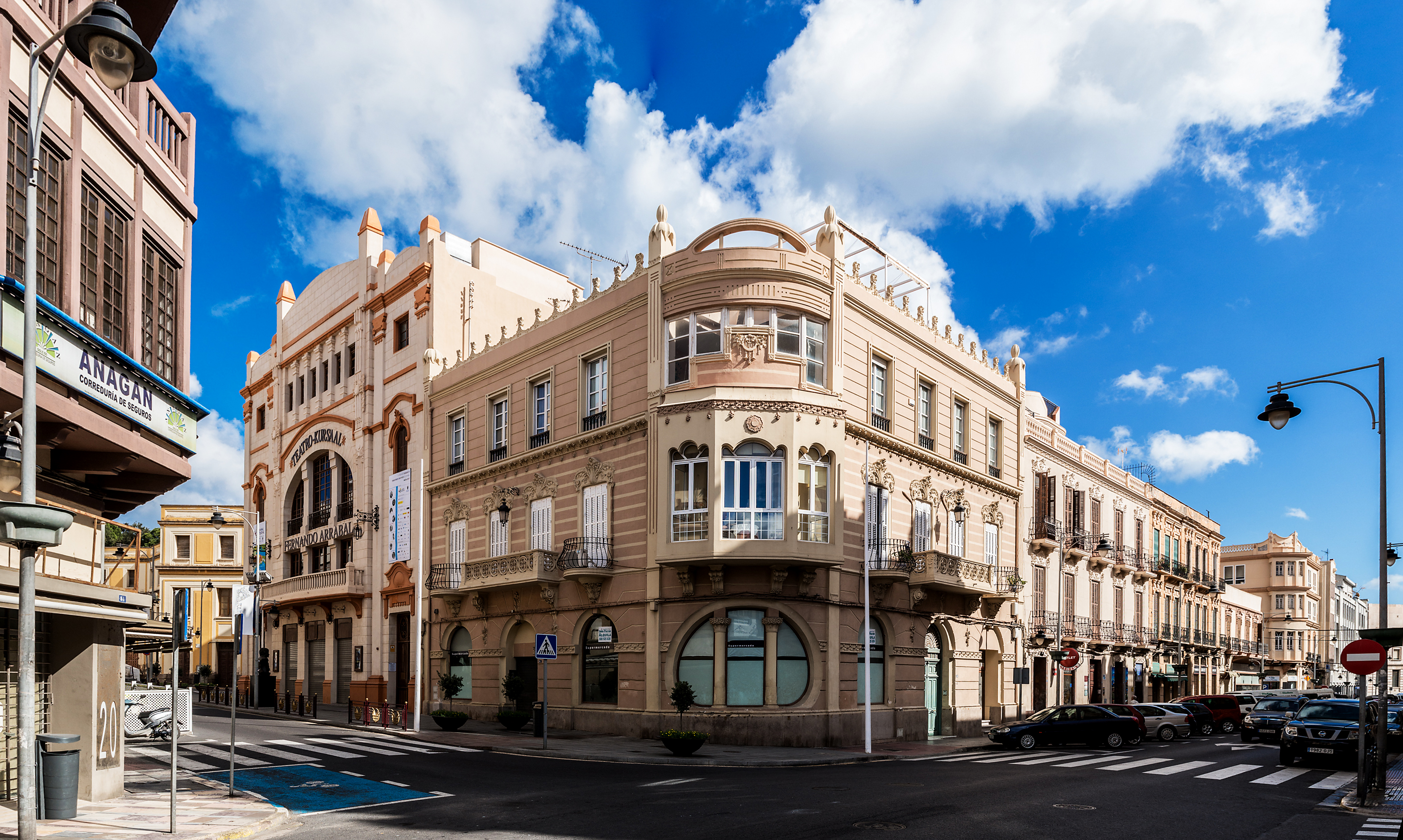
Antigua redacción de El Telegrama del Rif

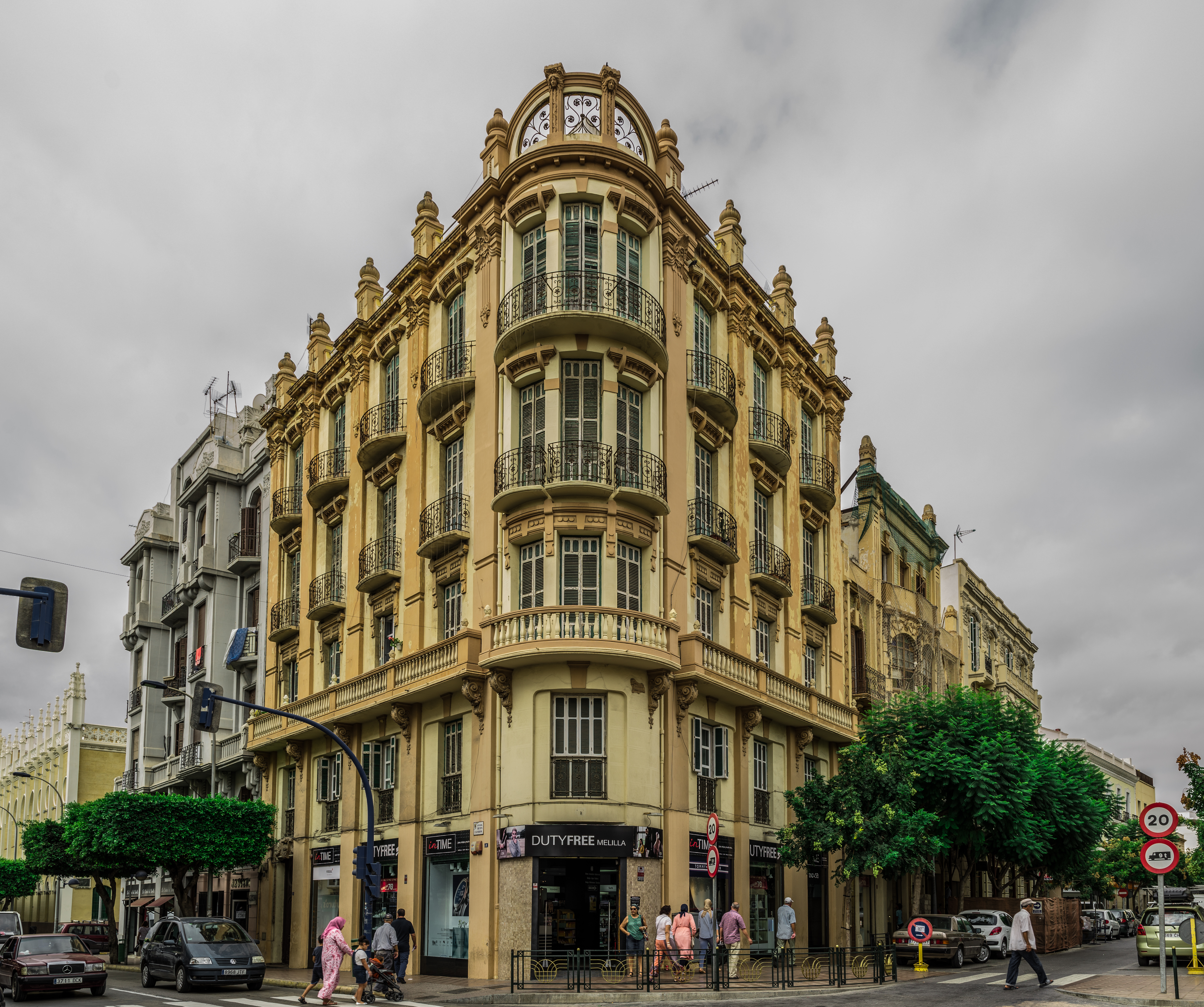
Casa de José García Álvaro (Edificio "El Acueducto")

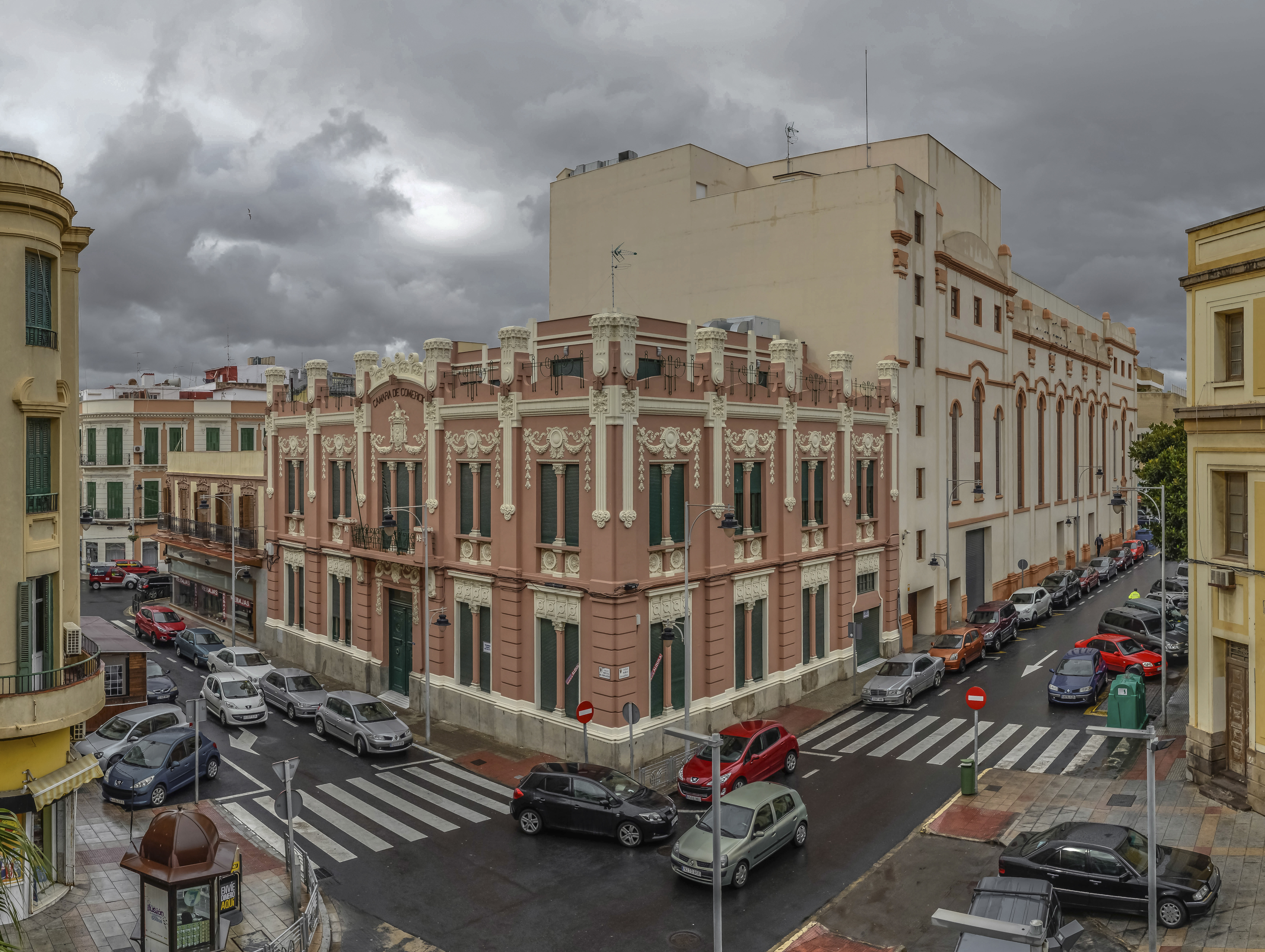
Cámara Oficial de Comercio, Industria y Navegación

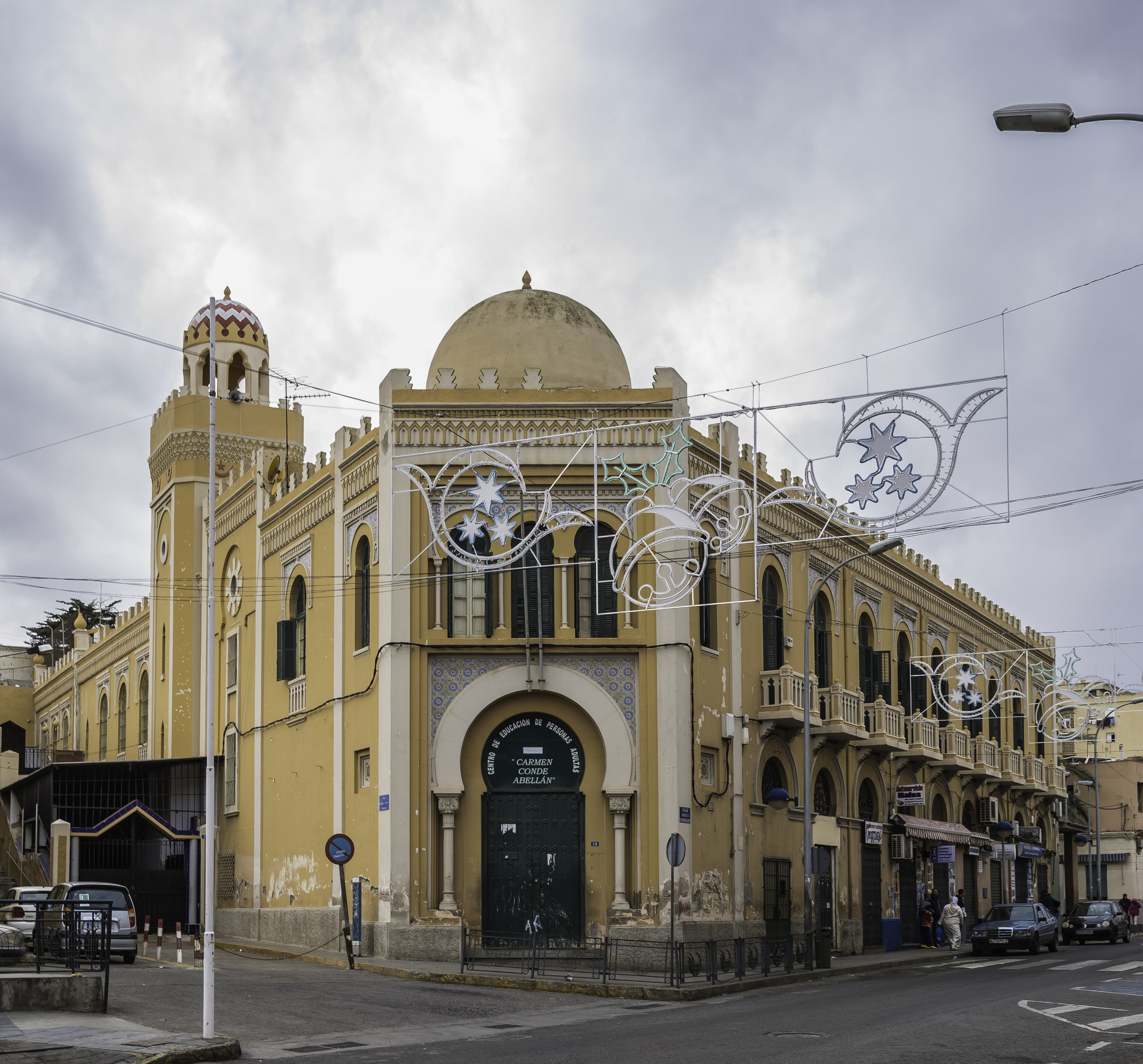
Mezquita Central

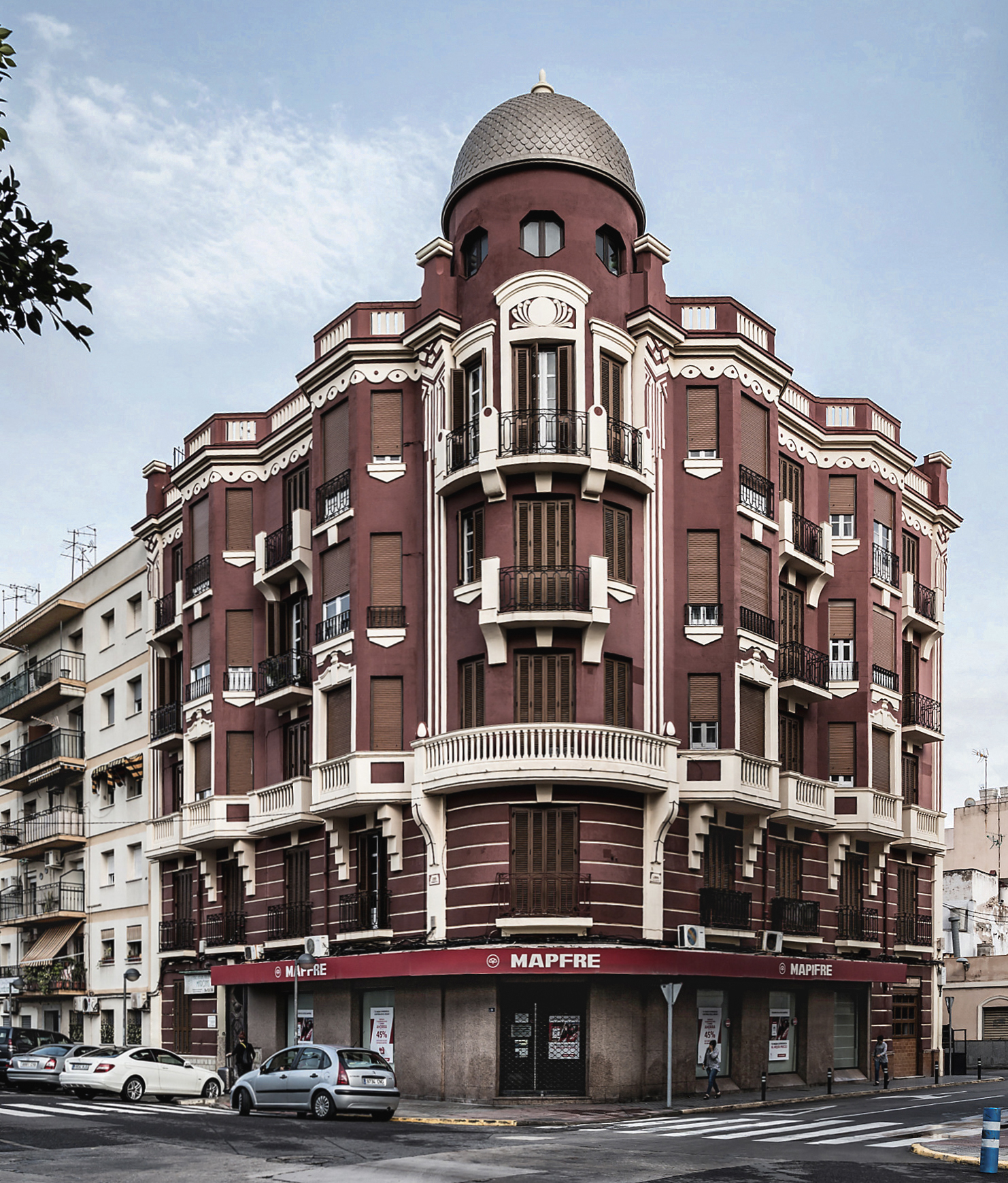
Avenida de la Democracia, 8
