= Apple of Discord =

Allegorical item from Greek mythology

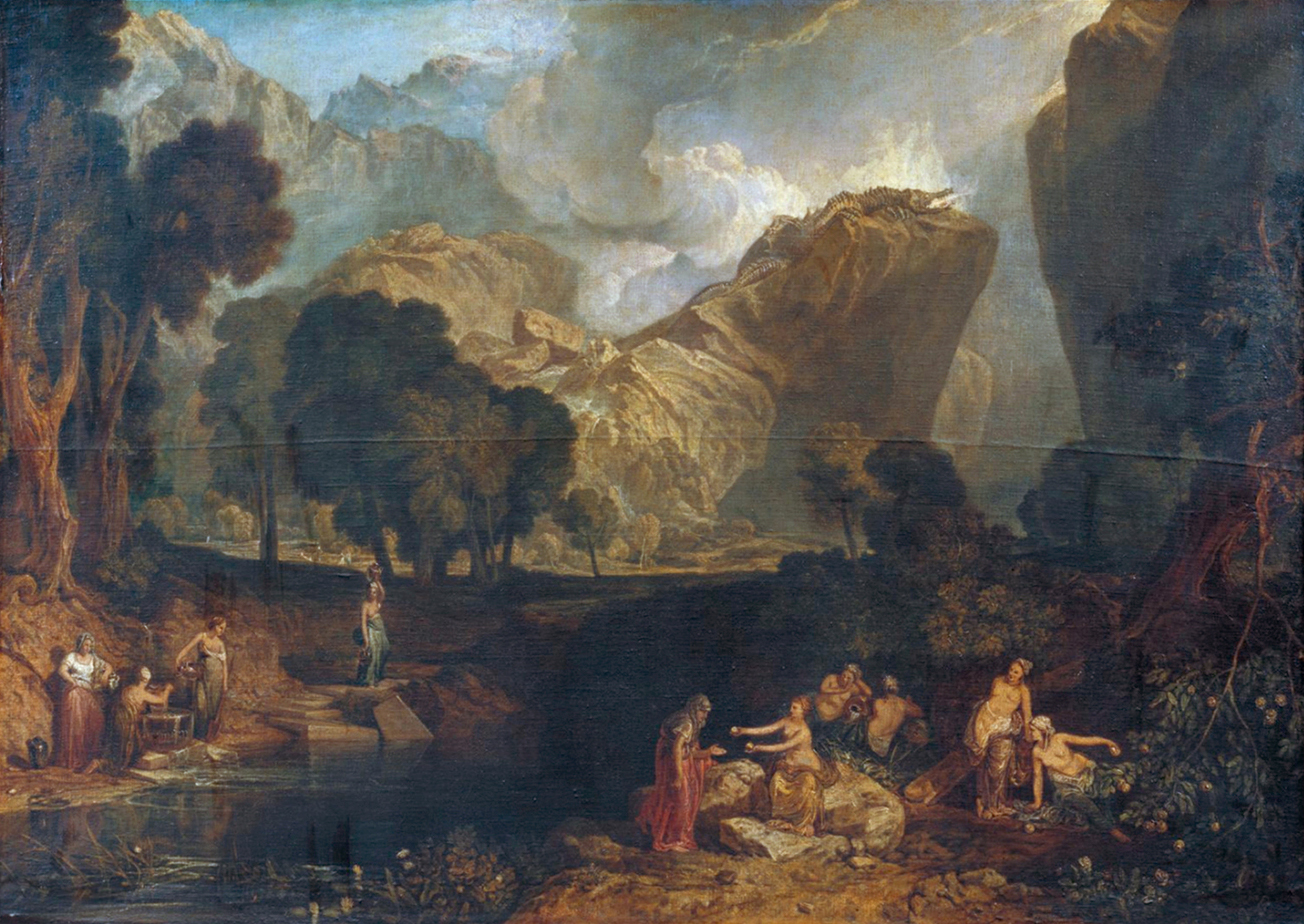
J. M. W. Turner, The Goddess of Discord Choosing the Apple of Contention in the Garden of the Hesperides (c. 1806)

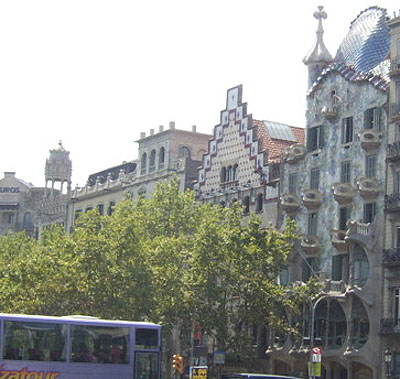
The manzana de la discordia (the turret on the left belongs to the Casa Lleó Morera; the building with the stepped triangular peak is the Casa Amatller; and the curved façade to its right is the Casa Batlló).

In Greek mythology, the Apple of Discord (Ancient Greek: μῆλον τῆς Ἔριδος) was a golden apple thrown by Eris, the goddess of strife, at the wedding of Peleus and Thetis. She was not invited and threw it out of anger to ruin the gathering (after showing up uninvited). It sparked a vanity-fueled dispute among Hera, Athena, and Aphrodite that led to the Judgement of Paris and ultimately the Trojan War.

In common parlance, the "apple of discord" is the core, kernel, or crux of an argument, or a small matter that could lead to a bigger dispute.

== Derivative uses ==
In the Eixample district of Barcelona, there is a block nicknamed in Spanish La manzana de la discordia (Catalan: Illa de la Discòrdia). The reason for this usage is that the word manzana means both "apple" and "city block" in Spanish. It was so named ("block of discord") because it features four different interpretations of Modernisme architecture: Antoni Gaudí's Casa Batlló, Lluís Domènech i Montaner's Casa Lleó Morera, Josep Puig i Cadafalch's Casa Amatller, and Enric Sagnier's Casa Mulleras.

== "To the Most Beautiful" ==
In some later sources, Eris inscribed on the apple "for the fairest" or "to the most beautiful" before tossing it. The most popular version of the inscription in Greek is τῇ καλλίστῃ (transliterated: tē(i) kallistē(i), "for/to the most beautiful"). Καλλίστῃ is the dative singular of the feminine superlative of καλός, "beautiful". In Latin sources, the word is formosissima.

To rationalize the myth, Ptolemaeus Chennus wrote that, instead of an apple, the three goddesses fought over which would get a man named Melus ("apple") as her priest, with Paris deciding in favor of Aphrodite.

== See also ==
- Killing three warriors with two peaches
- Discordianism
- Venus de Milo
