= Casa Lleó Morera =

Modernisme townhouse in Barcelona

- Casa Lleó Morera
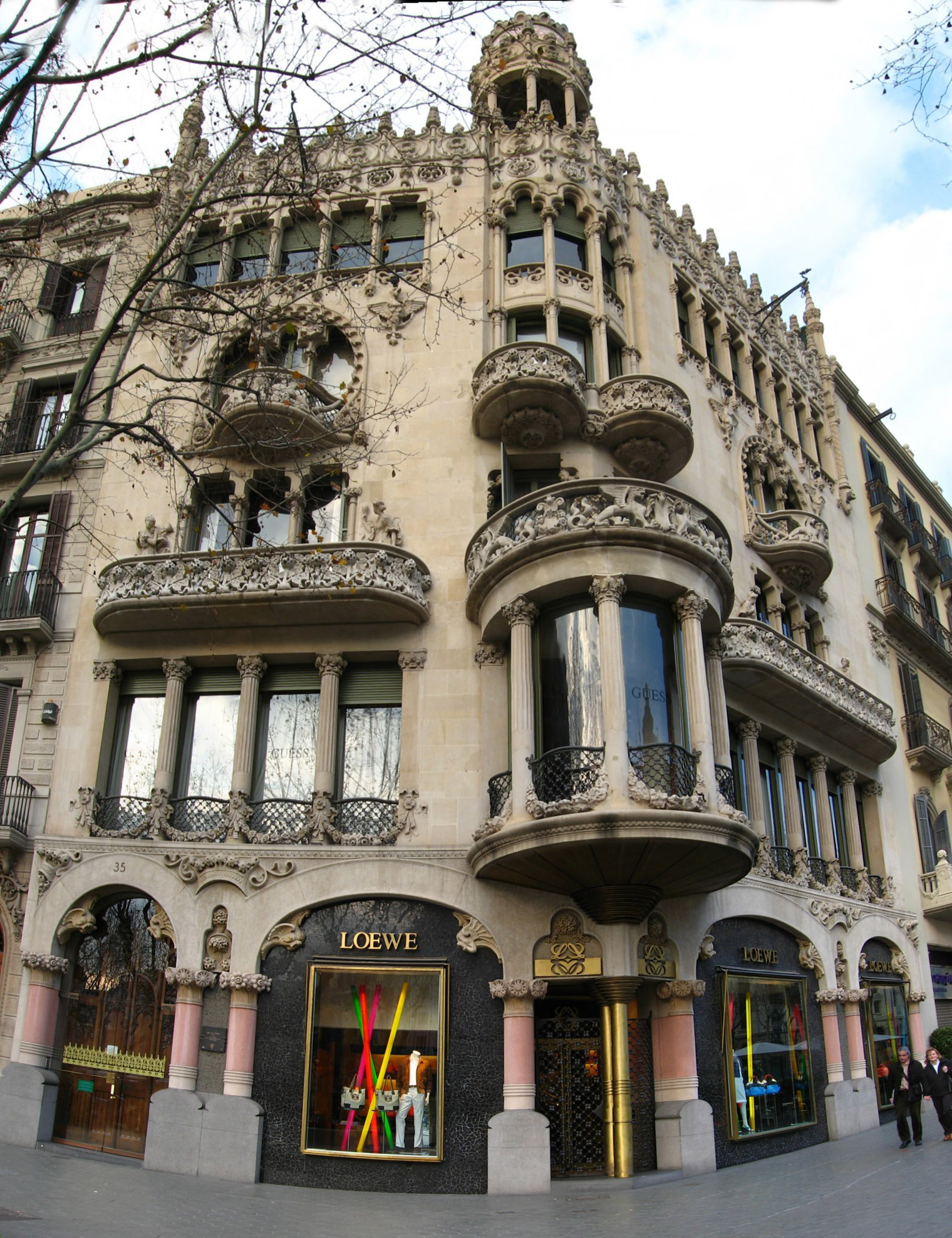
- Interactive map of the Casa Lleó Morera area

General information
- Architectural style: Modernisme
- Location: Barcelona, Catalonia; 41°23′28.3″N 2°9′55.8″E, Passeig de Gràcia, Barcelona, 35
- Construction started: c. 1902

Design and construction
- Architect: Lluís Domènech i Montaner

The Casa Lleó Morera (Catalan pronunciation: [ˈkazə ʎəˈo muˈɾeɾə]) is a building designed by noted modernisme architect Lluís Domènech i Montaner, located at Passeig de Gràcia 35 in the Eixample district of Barcelona. In 1902 Francesca Morera assigned Lluís Domènech i Montaner to remodel ancient "casa Rocamora", built in 1864. She died in 1904, and the building was named after her son, Albert Lleó i Morera. The building is located on the corner of Carrer del Consell de Cent, and is one of the three important buildings of Barcelona's Illa de la Discòrdia ("Block of Discord"), and it is the only building of the block awarded Barcelona's town council's Arts Building Annual Award (Concurso annual de edificios artísticos), obtained in 1906. The building lost some of its most representative elements, such as the tempietto on its top (now restored) and the ground floor and mezzanine's architectural sculpture. The building is also known as the residence of Cuban-Catalan photographer Pau Audouard.

== The building ==
The building was not only the result of an architectural project, but —common practice in Catalan modernism architecture—, several artists collaborated with Domènech i Montaner so as to make a complete artwork, inspired in natural and organic motifs: Lluís Bru and Mario Maragliano were responsible of the mosaic work, Eusebi Arnau made the sculptures, Antoni Serra i Fiter elaborated the ceramics, and Gaspar Homar designed the decoration and the furniture.

It has been considered that Morera's family wanted to leave trace of their lineage with the continuous references to their family name (Morera, which means mulberry tree in English) in the decoration. Some examples are the mulberry tree found in the patio, the mulberry motifs of the door handles or the portraits made by Antoni Serra in the second floor.

The façade and ground floor of the building were decorated with big and varied modernist ornaments, with some outstanding sculptures by Eusebi Arnau surrounding the entrance, which represented two couples of feminine figures holding vases. Those sculptures were installed on double pairs of columns made of pink marble, and under the gallery of the first floor, other feminine heads could be found. On the first floor, aside the windows, two couples of feminine figures can also be found, showing several objects related to the technological improvements made in that period, such as the phonograph, electricity, telephone and photography. Barcelona's official chronicler Lluís Permanyer stated that this building is like "a scaled Palau de la Música Catalana."

The building has been considered one of the best examples of modernisme architecture, but Noucentisme supporters performed several modifications to the original structure. In 1943, Raimon Duran i Reynals signed a refurbishing project for the ground floor, designed by Francisco Ferrer Bartolomé according to an assignment by Loewe so as to open a store. This project included the disappearance of the modernist windows and the ground floor feminine modernist plant boxes made by Eusebi Arnau, which were destroyed on the sidewalk using picks. The building caretaker later recovered the feminine heads, which were sold to Salvador Dalí, who installed them in Figuere's Teatre-Museu Dalí's patio.

In the mid-1980s, architect Òscar Tusquets was commissioned to restore the building. The pinnacles and the tempietto at the top of the structure, severely damaged by machine guns during the Spanish Civil War were restored, and the ground floor damage was partially recovered. The building underwent another restoration process in 1992, and was bought by Grupo Núñez y Navarro in 2006, responsible for another restoration operation. In 2007 the building was put on the Art Nouveau European Route.

In April 2012 the most recent restoration project was completed, focused on the ground floor. Several elements such as the carriage entrance, several columns and some mosaics were recovered.

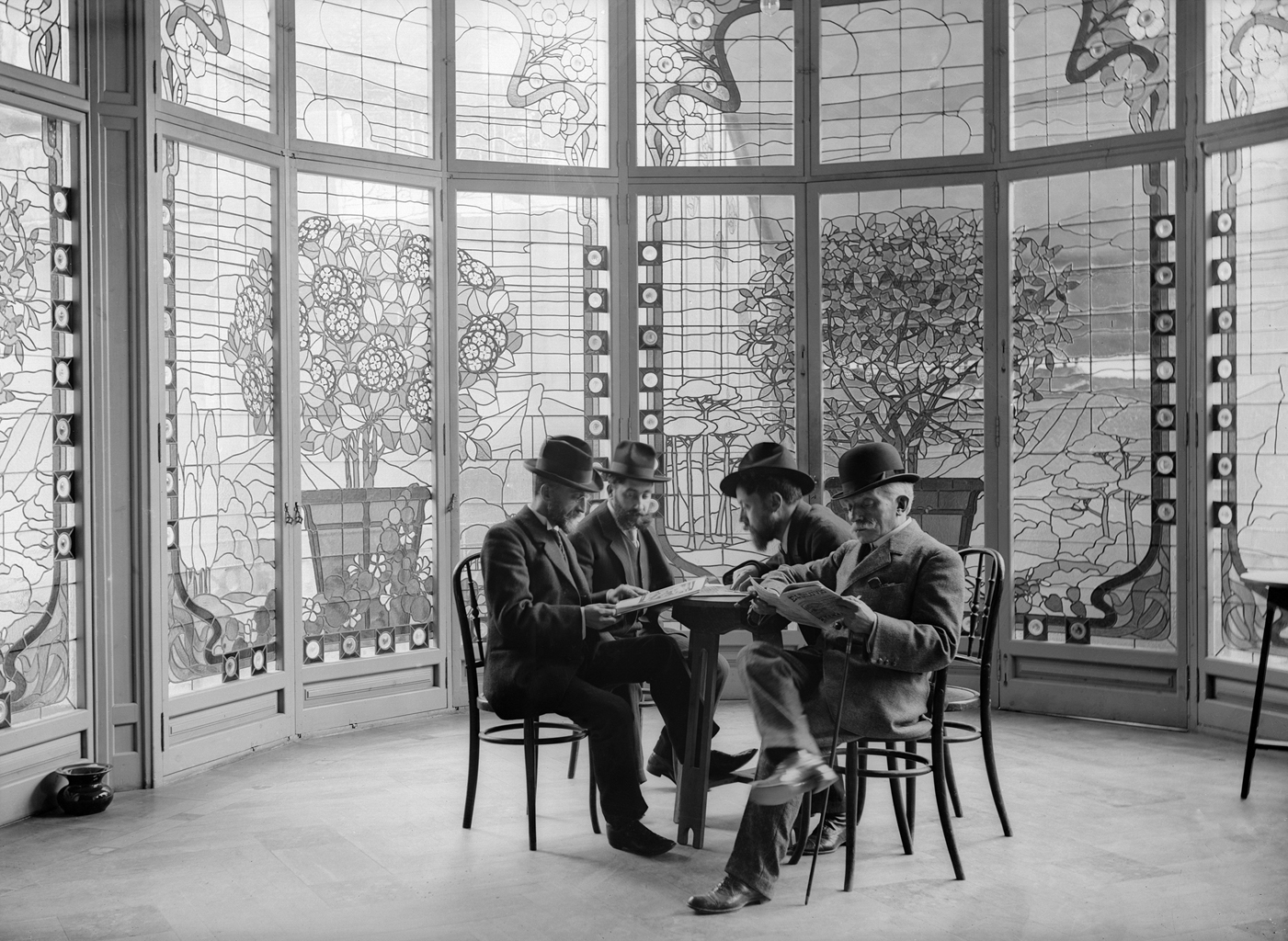
Interior of Casa Lleó Morera's covered gallery (1st floor), stained glass by Antoni Rigalt i Blanch; photo taken by Baldomer Gili i Roig (2nd from the right)

== Gallery ==
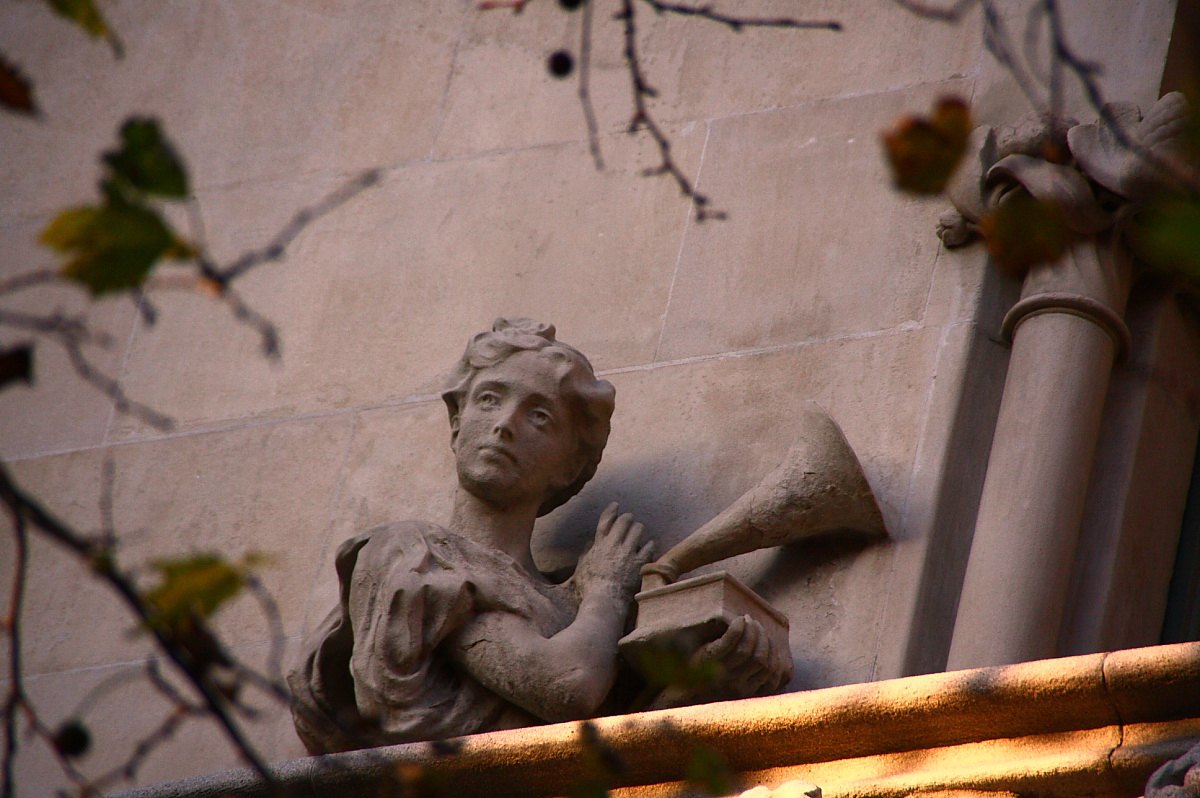
Sculpture by Eusebi Arnau, holding a phonograph

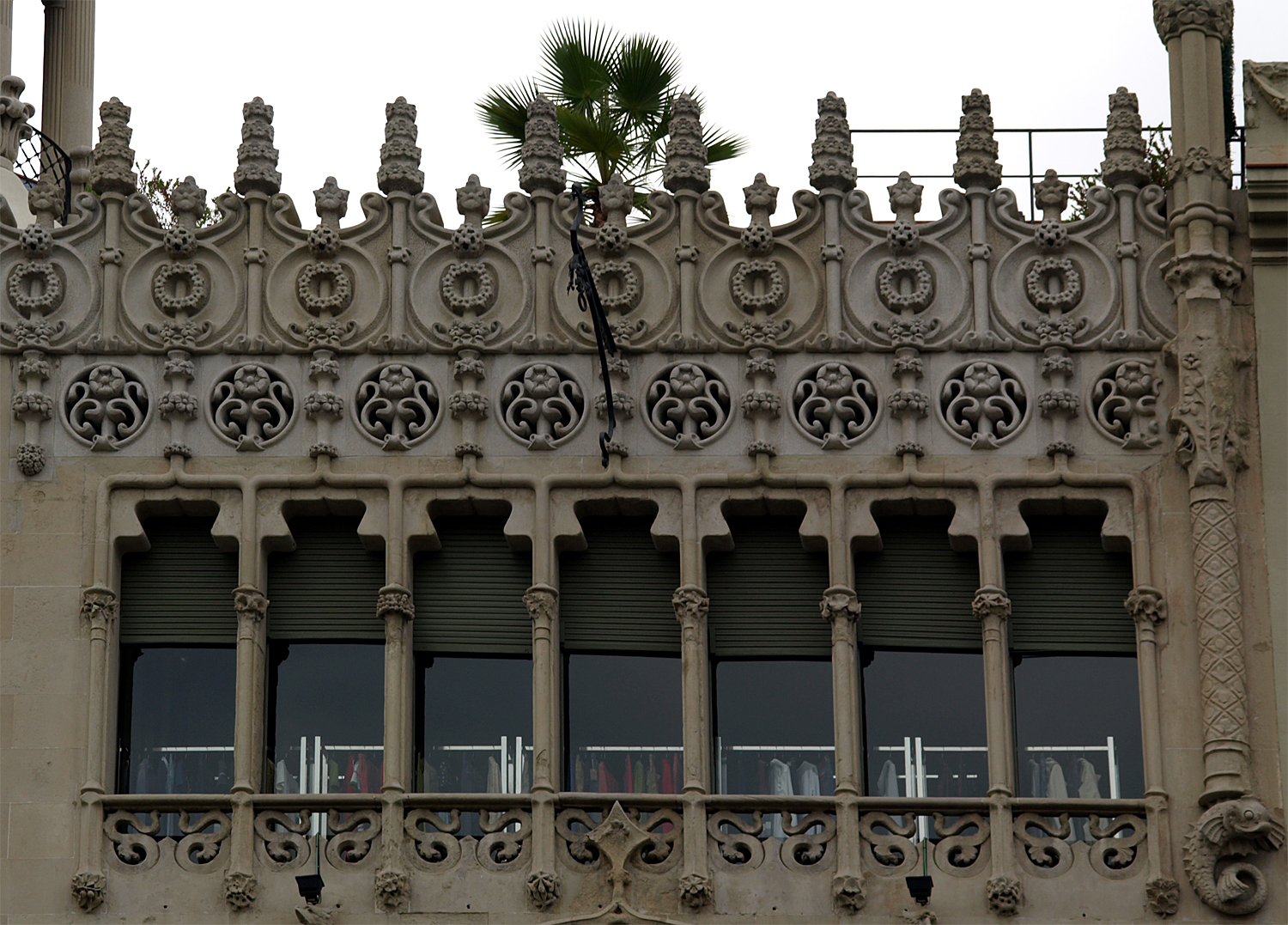
Third floor gallery

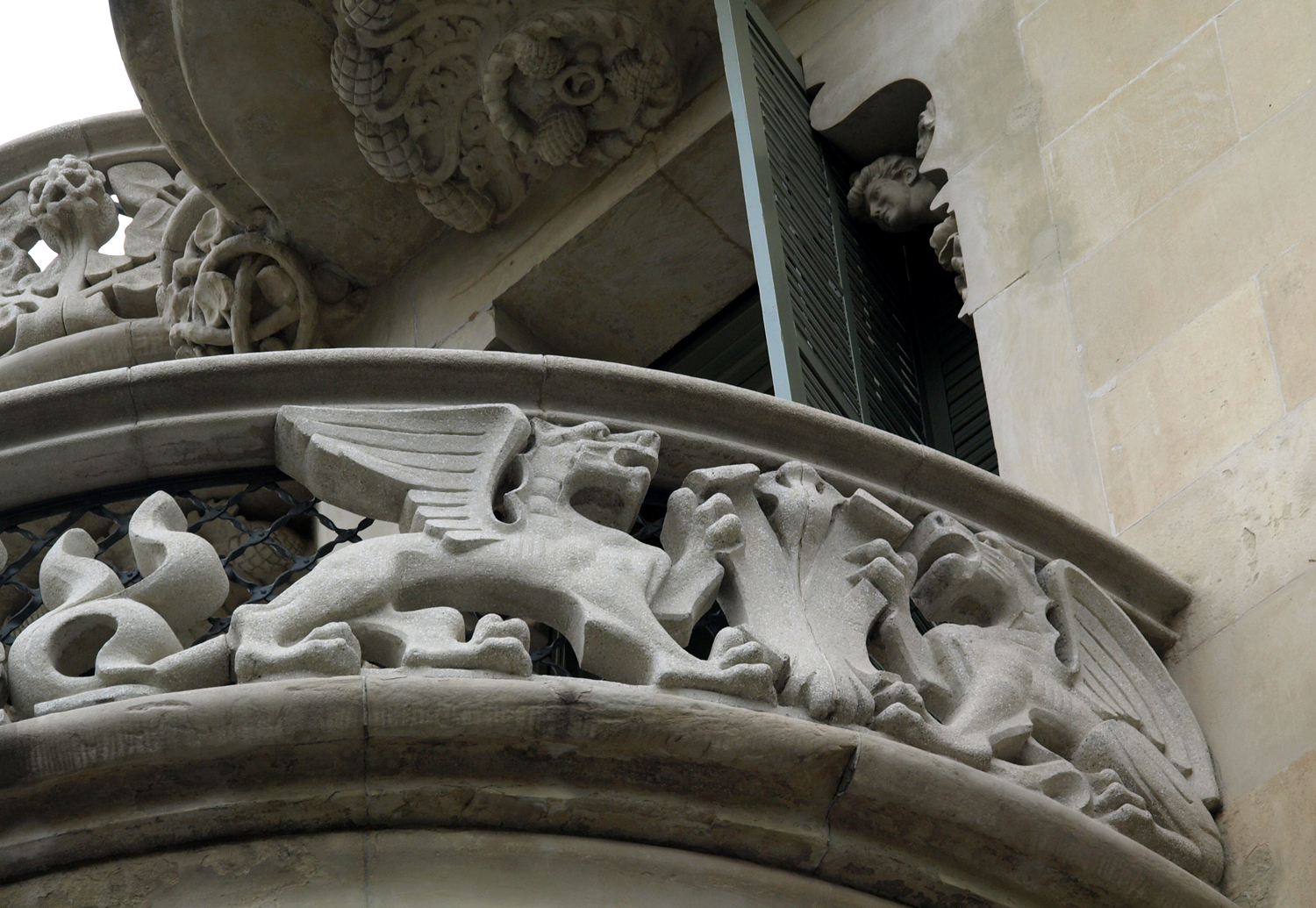
Second floor balcony

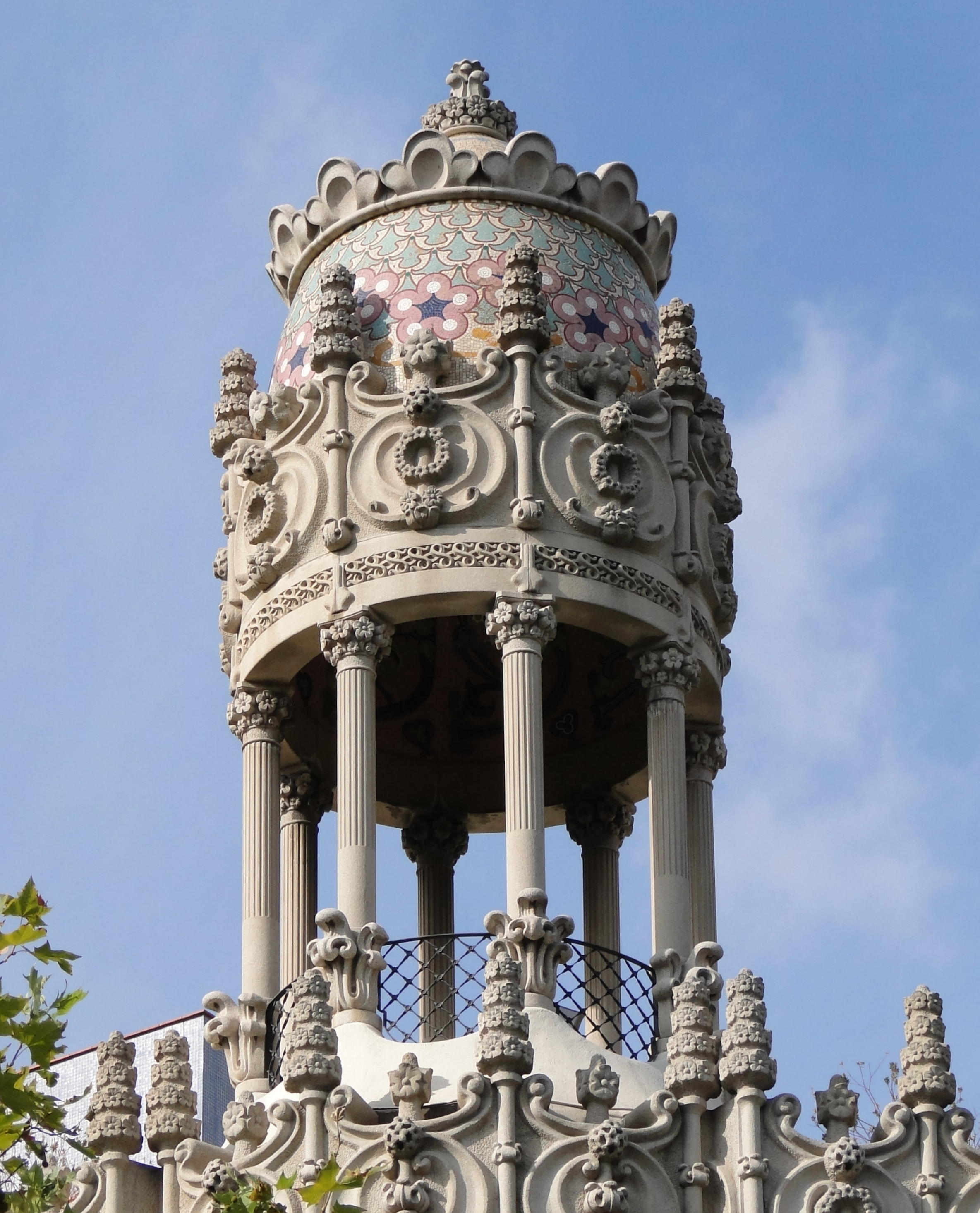
Tempietto at the top of the building

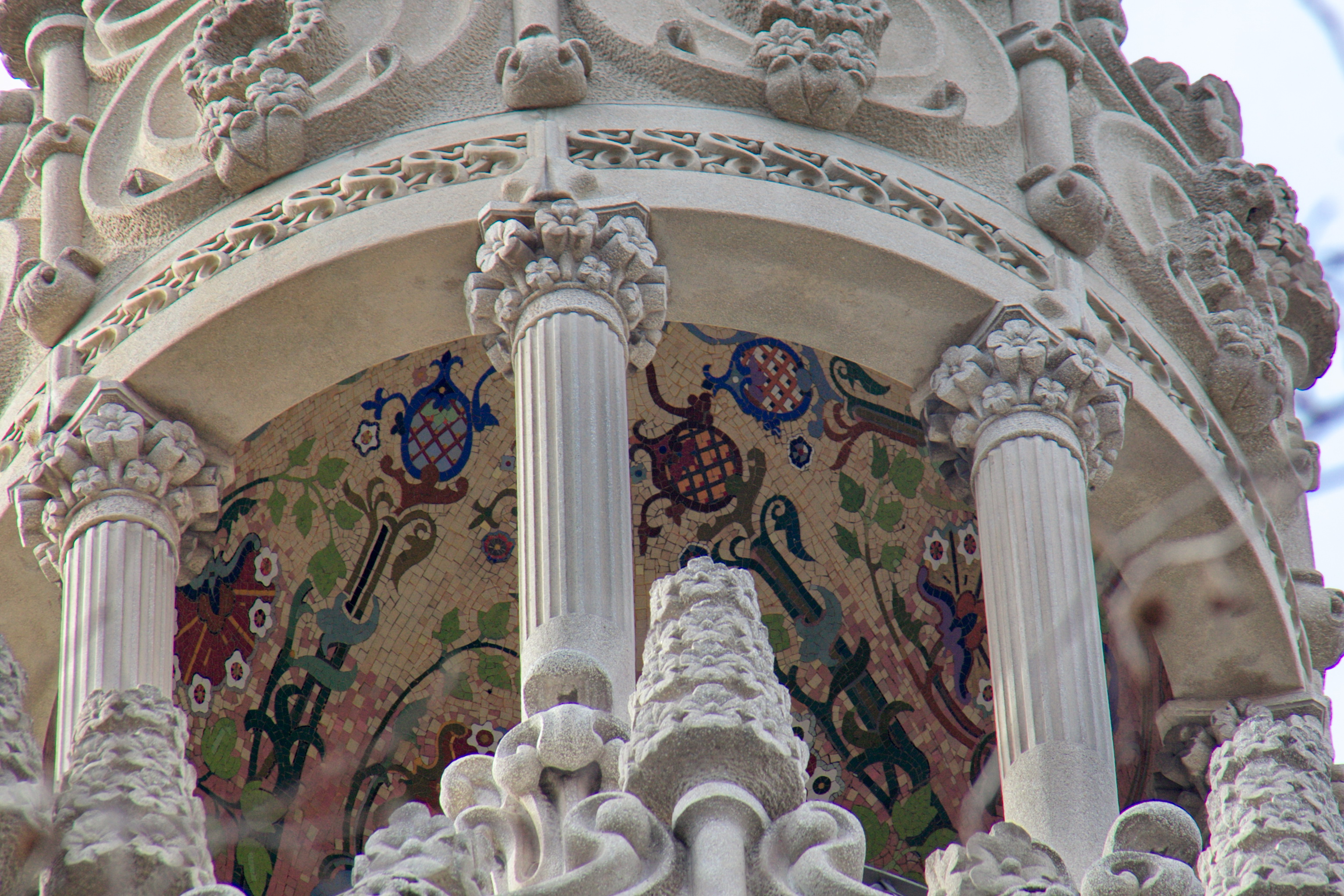
Mosaic in the ceiling of the Tempietto

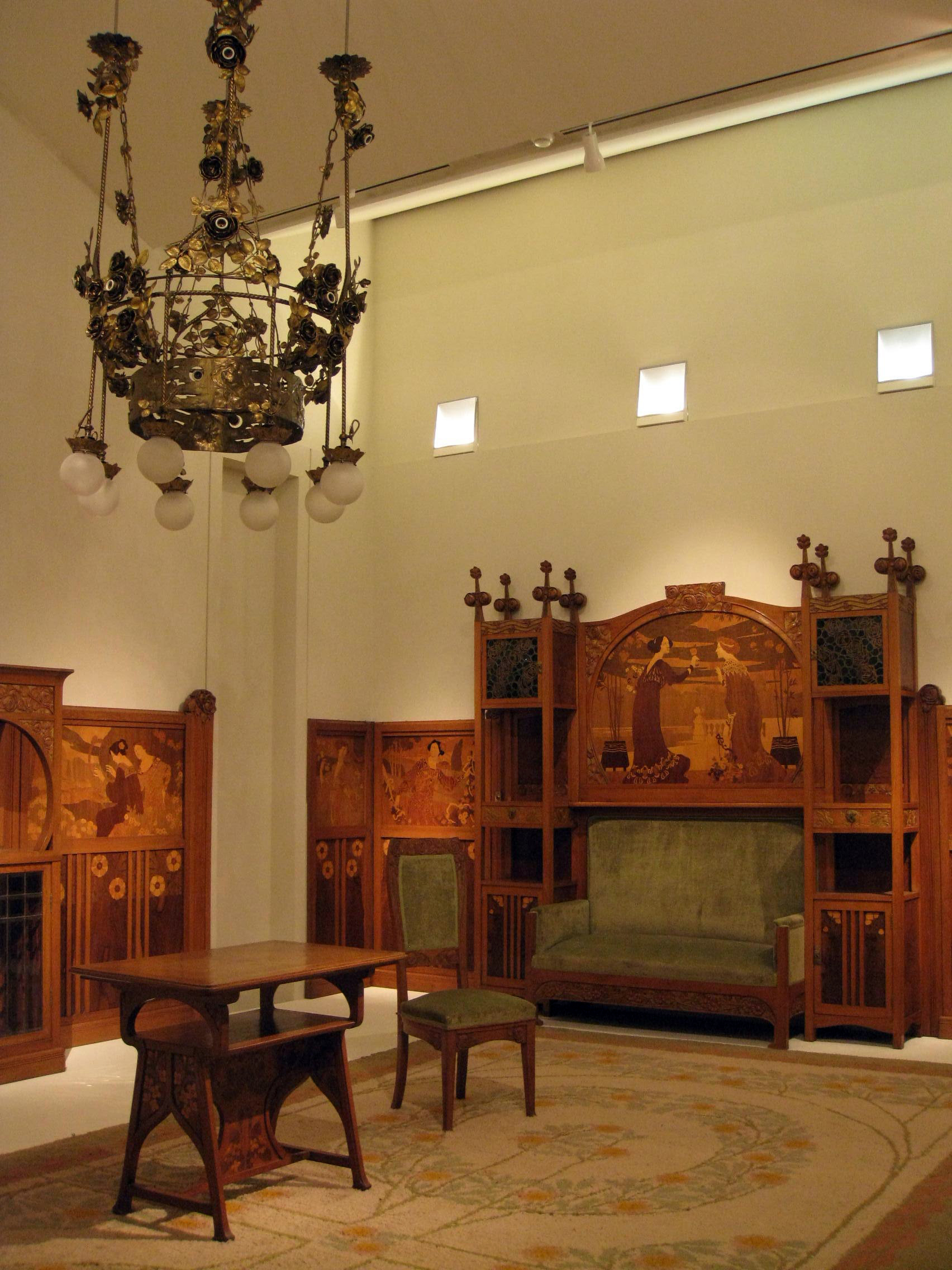
Main Floor Saloon by Gaspar Homar, conserved at Museu Nacional d'Art de Catalunya.

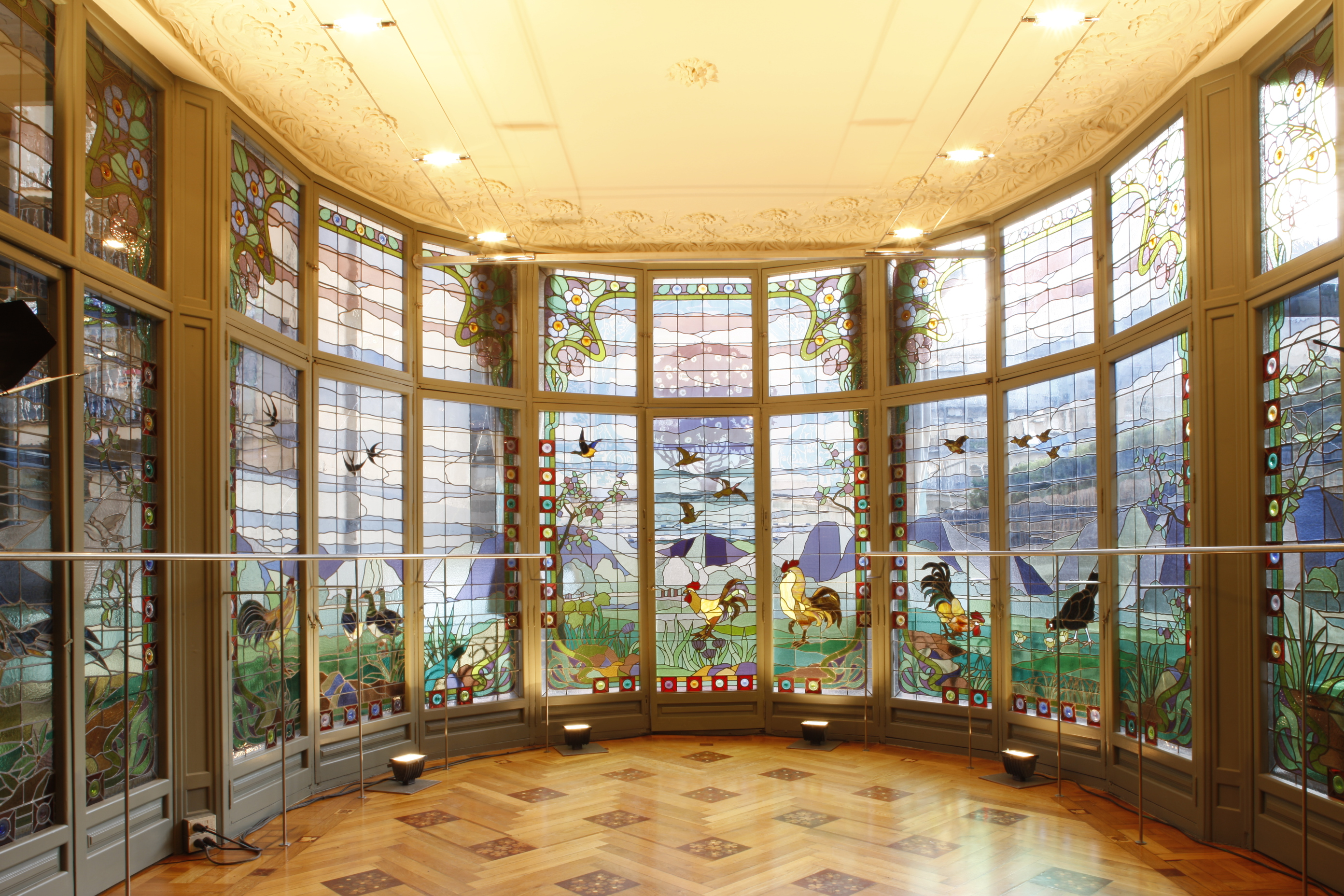
Stained glass gallery, first floor

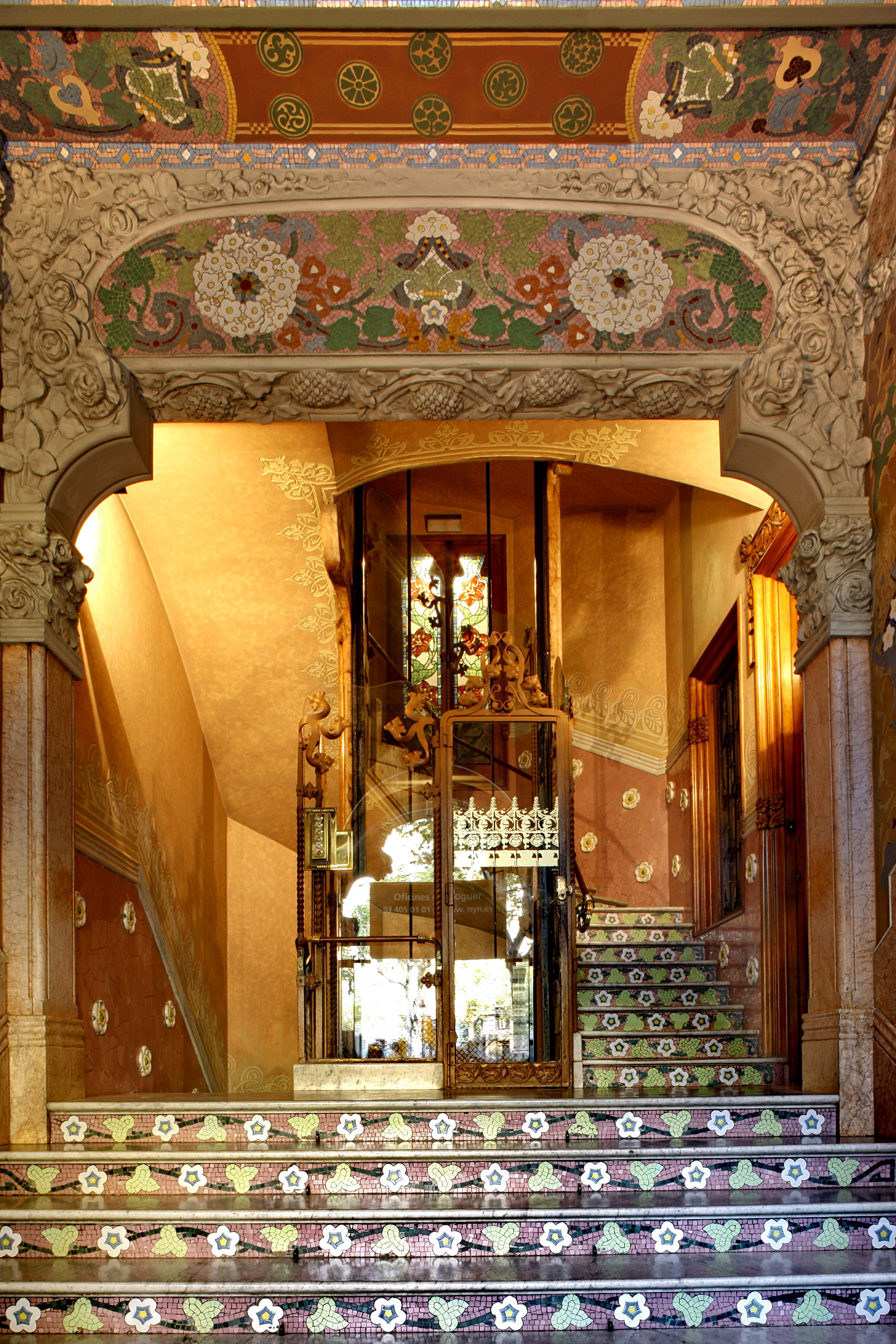
vestibule

Buildings of the Illa de la Discòrdia, Barcelona

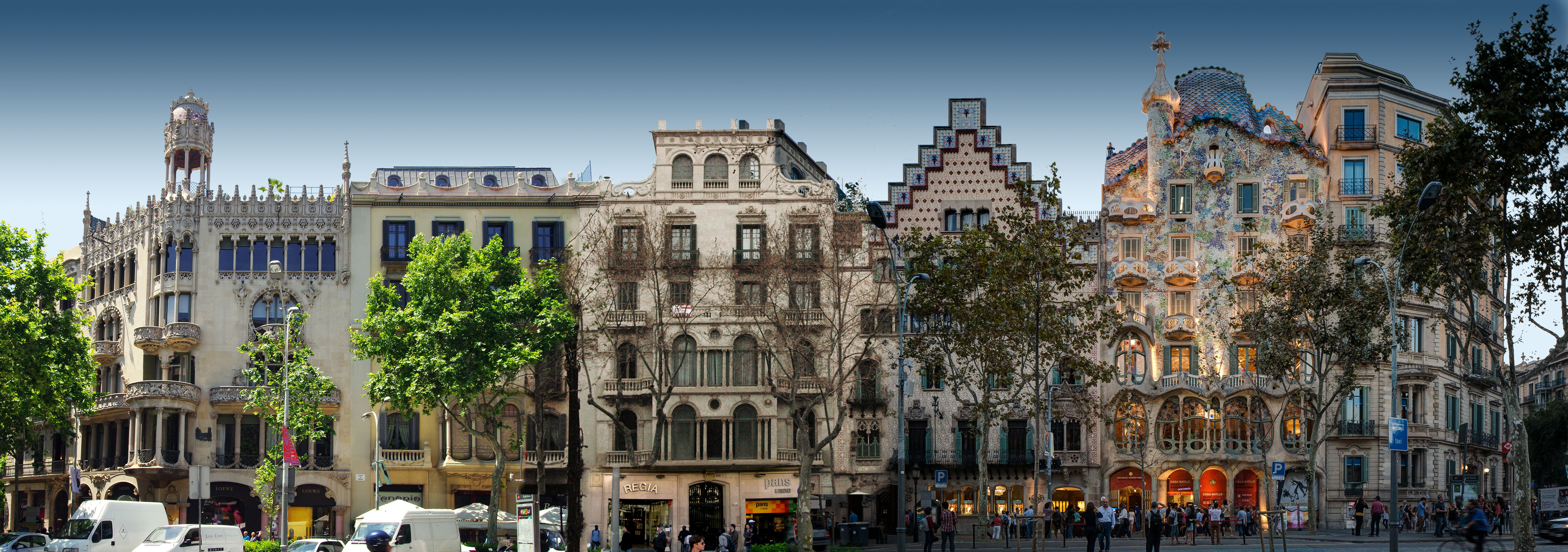
Illa de la Discòrdia

Casa Lleó Morera
Pg. de Gràcia 35
Lluís Domènech i Montaner
(1905)

Casa Mulleras
Pg. de Gràcia 37
Enric Sagnier
(1906)

Casa Bonet
Pg. de Gràcia 39
Marceliano Coquillat
(1901/1915)

Casa Amatller
Pg. de Gràcia 41
Josep Puig i Cadafalch
(1900)

Casa Batlló
Pg. de Gràcia 43
Antoni Gaudí
(1877/1906)

== See also ==
- List of Modernisme buildings in Barcelona
