= Marceliano Coquillat =

Spanish architect

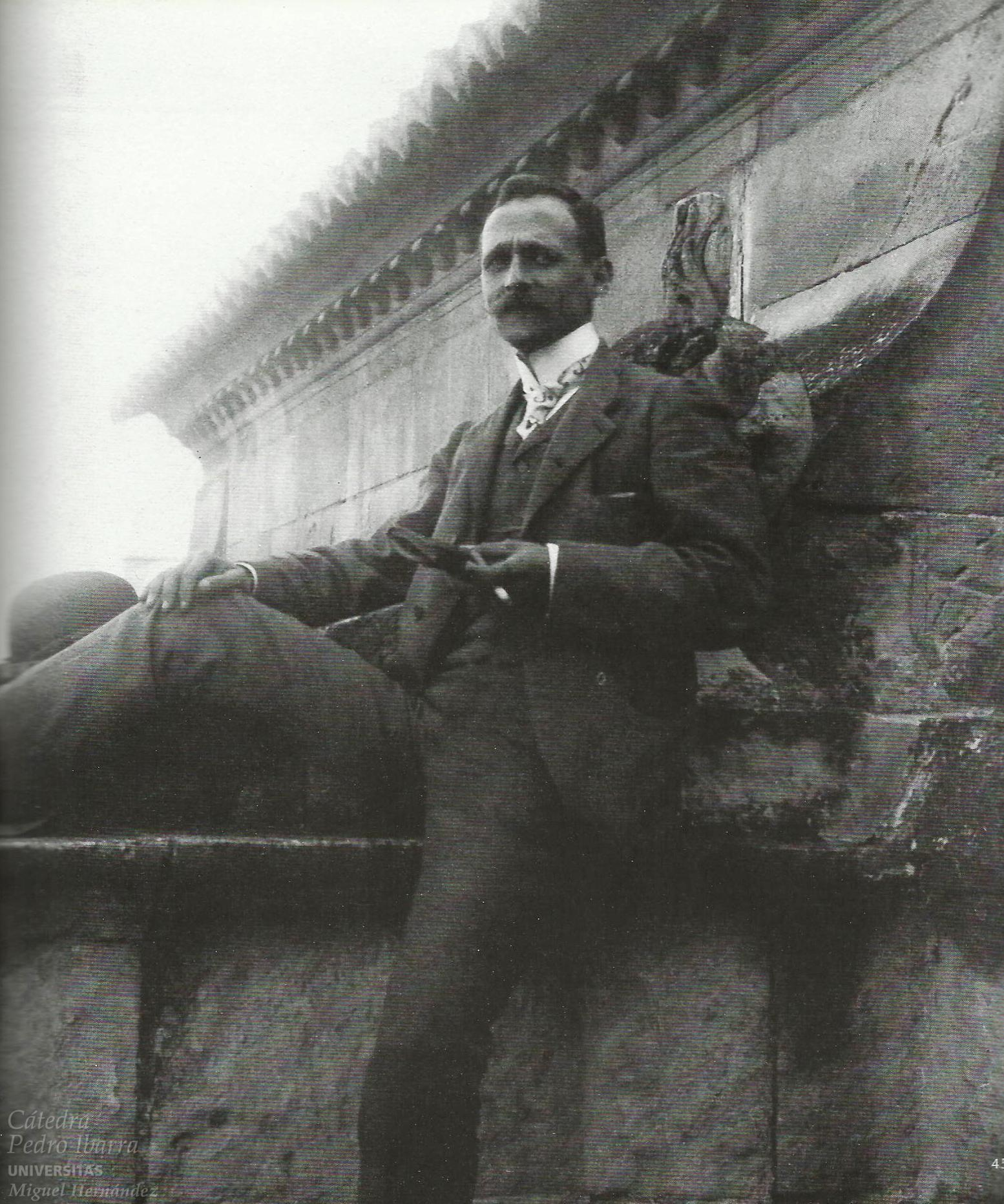
- Marceliano Coquillat pictured in 1903
- Born: November 1865; Elche
- Died: 28 December 1924 (aged 59)
- Other names: Marcel·lià Coquillat i Llofriu
- Occupation: Architect
- Buildings: Casa Maestre, Cartagena; Sarrià Market, Barcelona; Casa Bonet, Barcelona

Marcelino Coquillat y Llofriu (November 1865 – 28 December 1924) was a Spanish architect of the Modernisme and Noucentisme movements.

He was born in 1865 in Elche, Valencia, and studied architecture in Barcelona, graduating in 1892.

== Career ==
Developing his style in shadow of prominent Catalan architects such as Lluis Domenech i Montaner, Coquillat established himself as a noted proponent of the Modernista style in Catalunya. Most of his work is centred in Barcelona and San Justo Desvern.

Coquillat collaborated with other architects, such as Arnald Calvet i Peyronill on the market in Sarrià market and the Villa Conchita, and with Juli Marial i Tey on the Sant Miquel Tower in La Garriga.

=== Noted buildings ===
Between 1903 and 1905 he carried out restoration work on the Basilica of Santa María in his hometown of Elche. In 1906, Coquillat collaborated with architect Víctor Beltrí on a commission from the Maestre Pérez mining family to build Casa Maestre on Plaza de San Francisco in Cartagena. The facade of this strikingly ornate Moderniste house bears prominent Neo-Rococo features.

One of Coquillat's most noted buildings was the Hotel del Histógeno Llopis on the Paseo de Rosales, Madrid, a project for the pharmaceuticals entrepreneur Adolfo Llopis Castelado. The hotel was built 1912-1914 in the Catalan Modernist style, and was highly acclaimed by his contemporaries. The building was heavily ornamented and featured a prominent loggia and balustrades, and was topped with an ornate cupola. The hotel was demolished in the 1970s.

In 1915, Coquillat was commissioned to remodel the facade of the Casa Bonet in the fashionable Eixample district of Barcelona. Neighbouring houses on this block had been remodelled in a variety of clashing styles of the Modernista movement, giving the row of houses the nickname the Illa de la Discòrdia (Mansana de la Discòrdia). Coquillat moved away from the outlandish forms of Modernisme and chose instead to style the facade along relatively conservative Italianate Neo-Baroque lines. In contrast to the neighbouring Casa Amatller (Cadafalch, 1900) and Casa Batlló (Gaudí, 1904), Coquillat's Casa Bonet is generally overlooked.

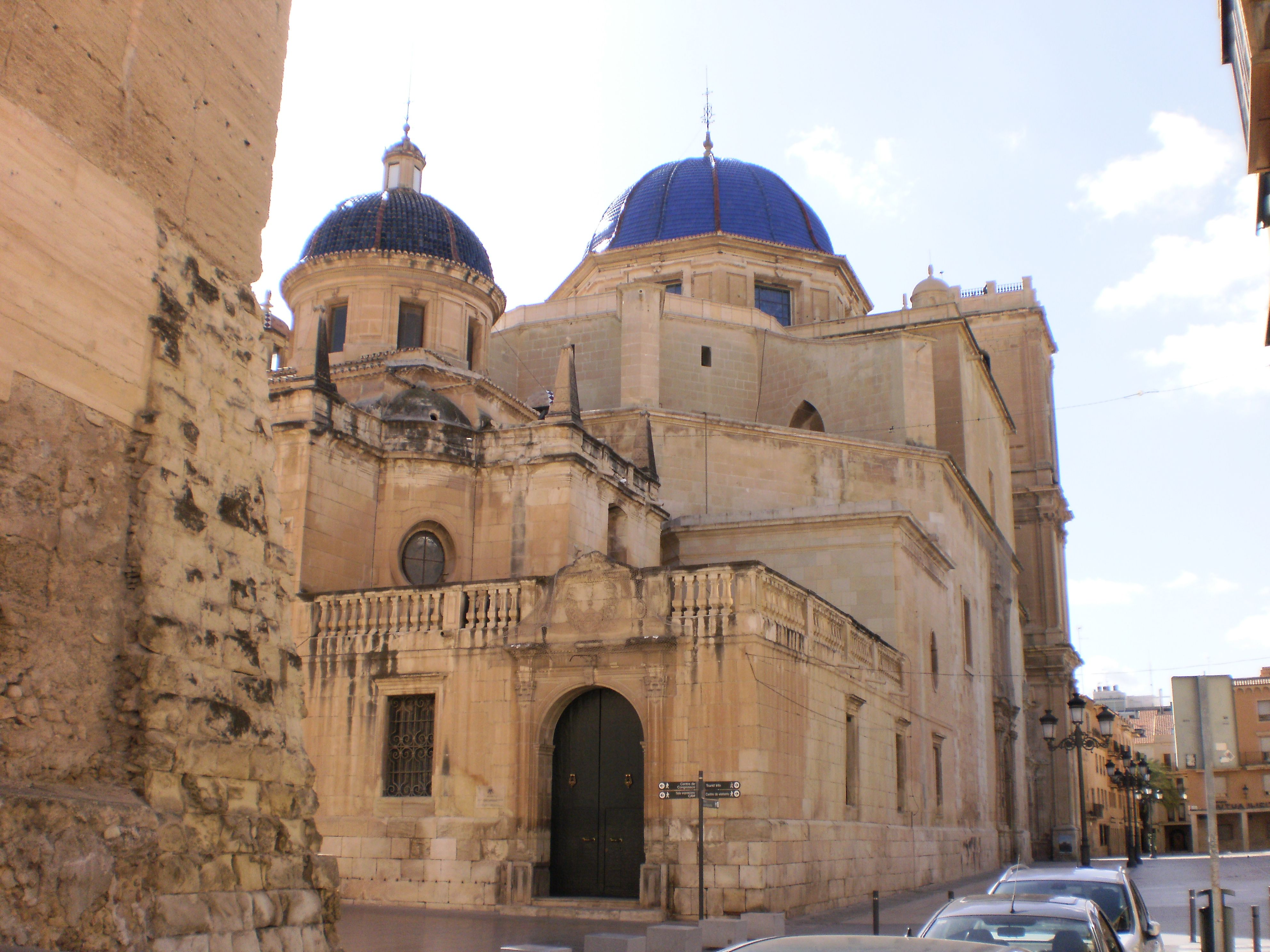
Basílica de Santa María de Elche (restoration 1903-5)

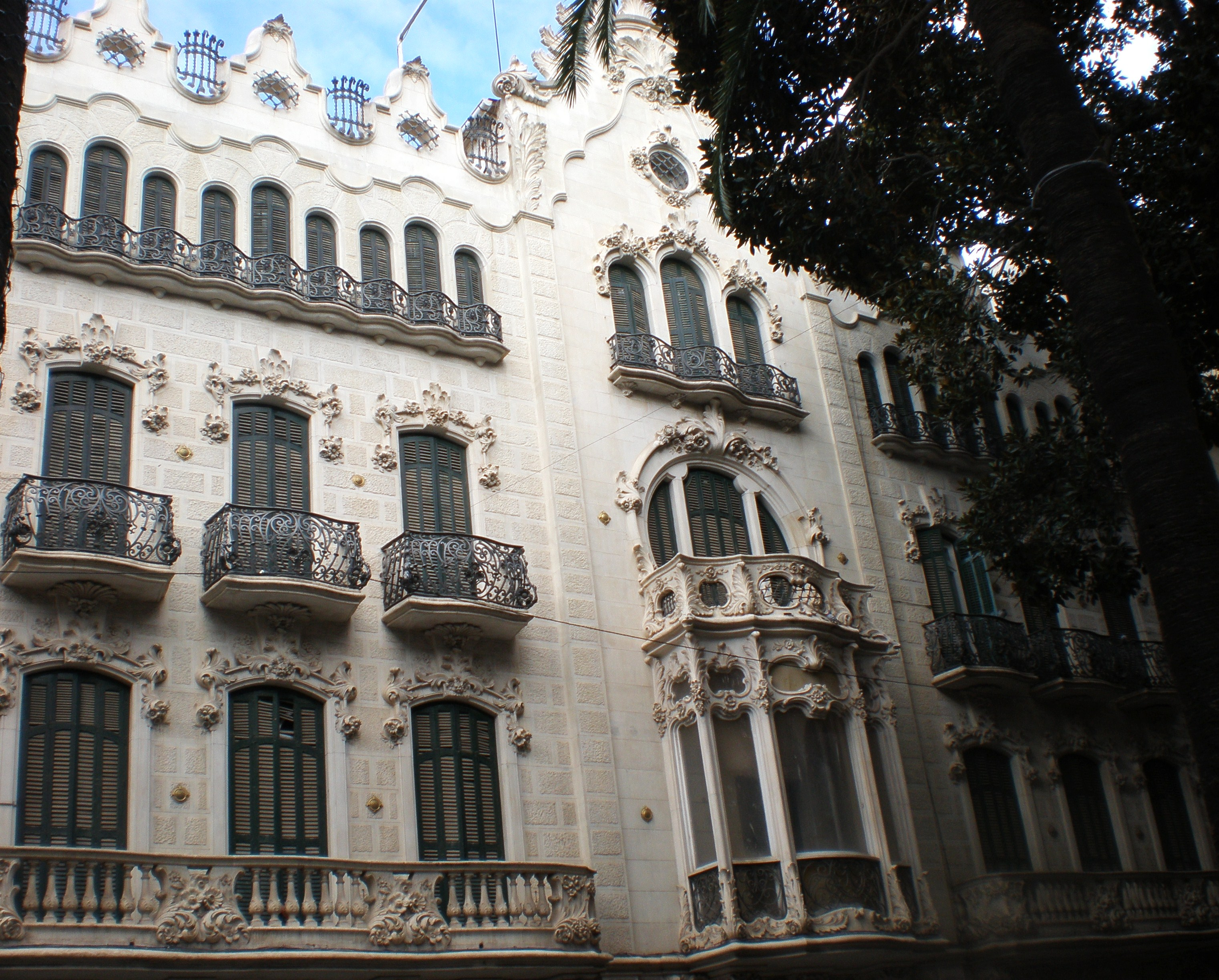
Casa Maestre, Cartagena (1906)

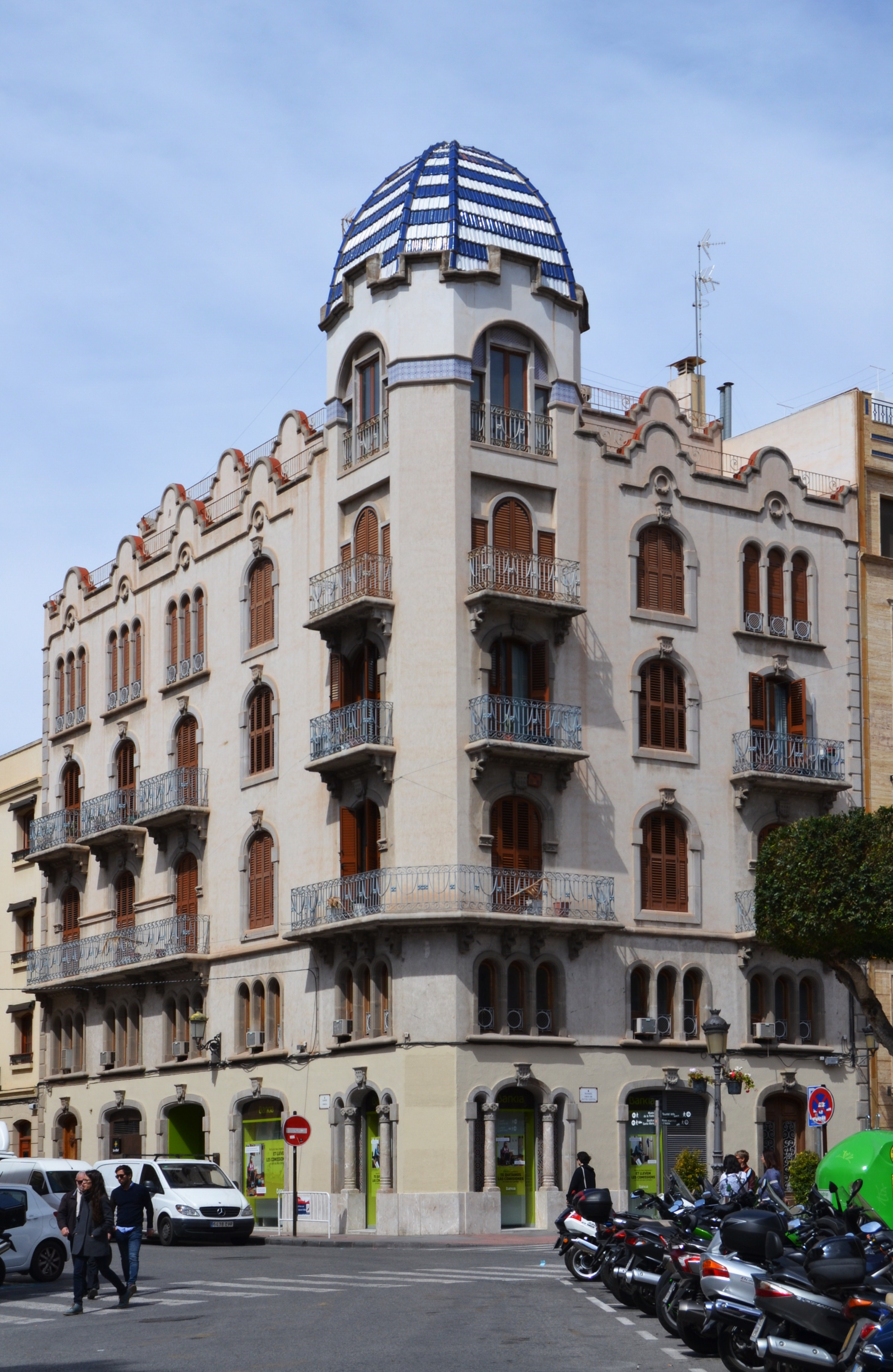
Edificio de la Mutua, Elche (1910)

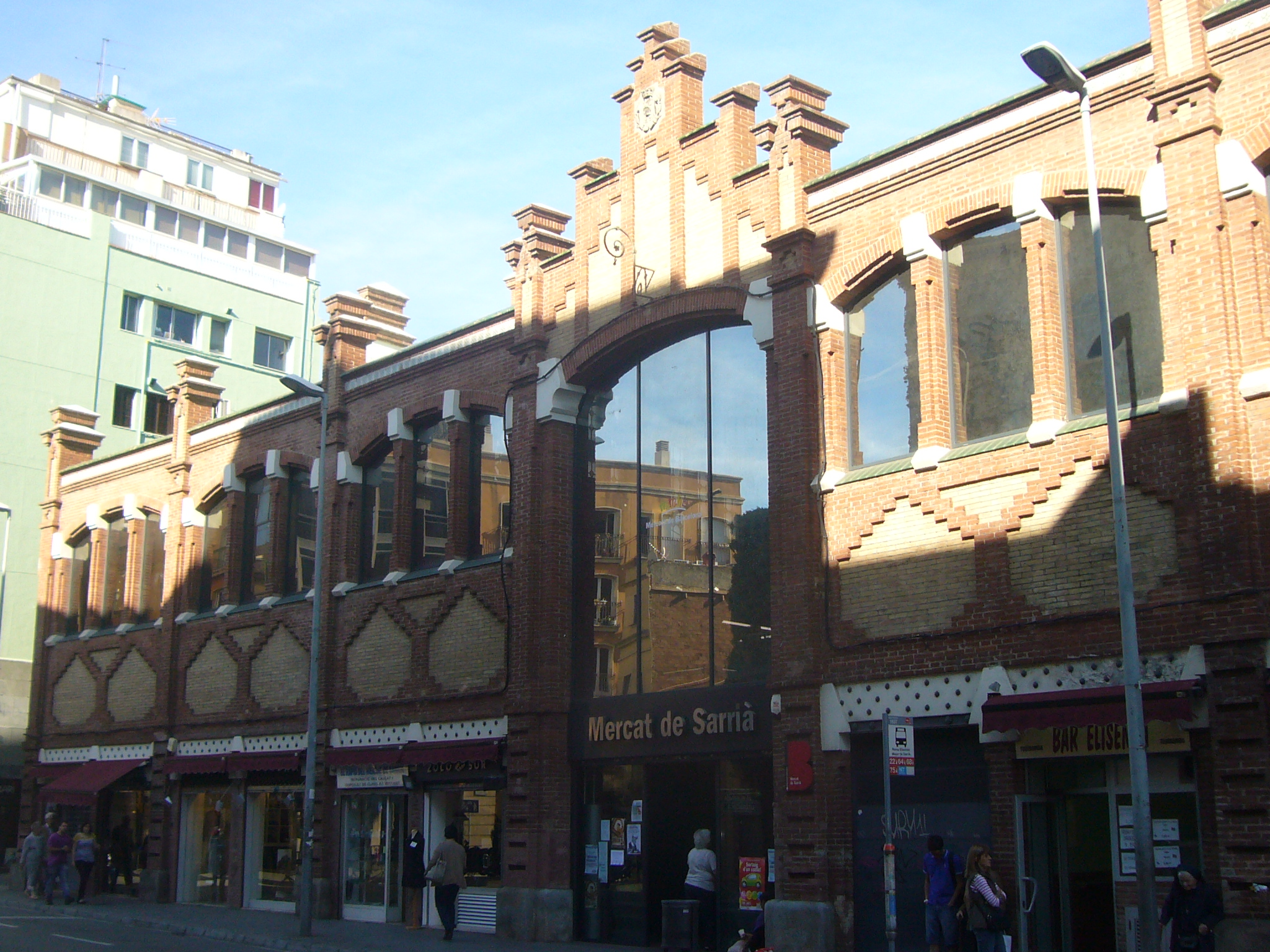
Sarrià Market building (1911)

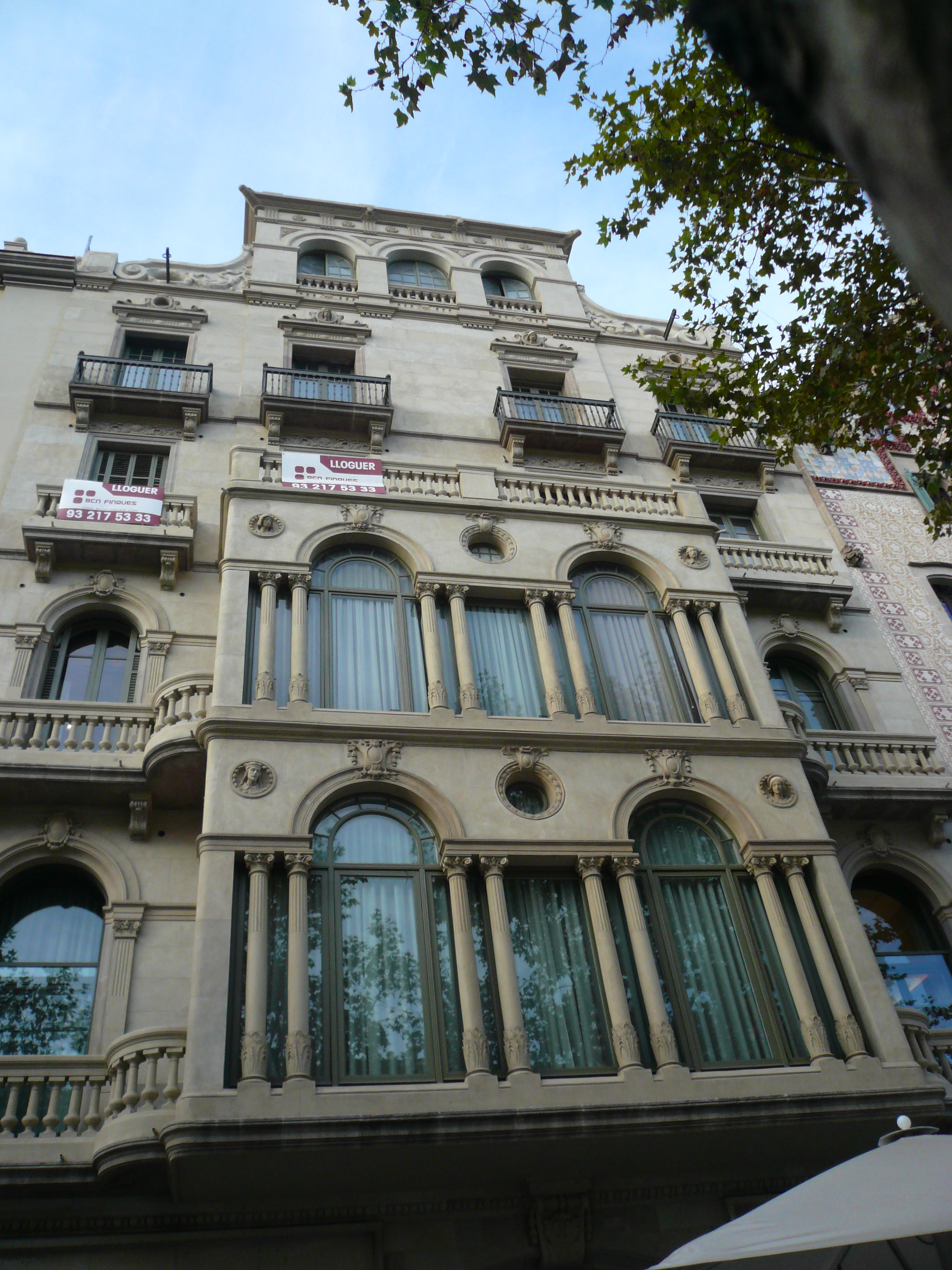
Casa Bonet, Barcelona (1911)

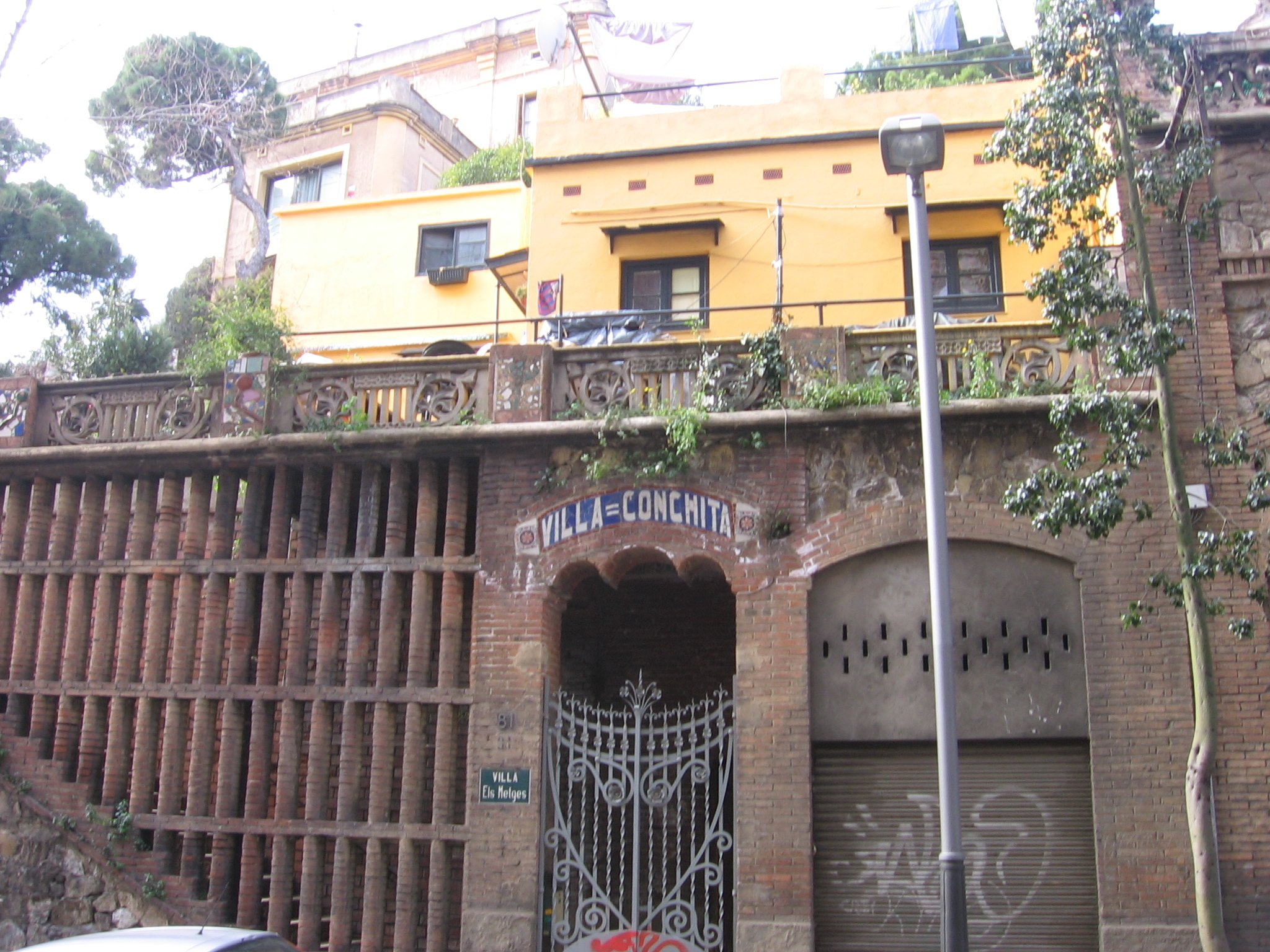
Villa Conchita, Barcelona (1912)

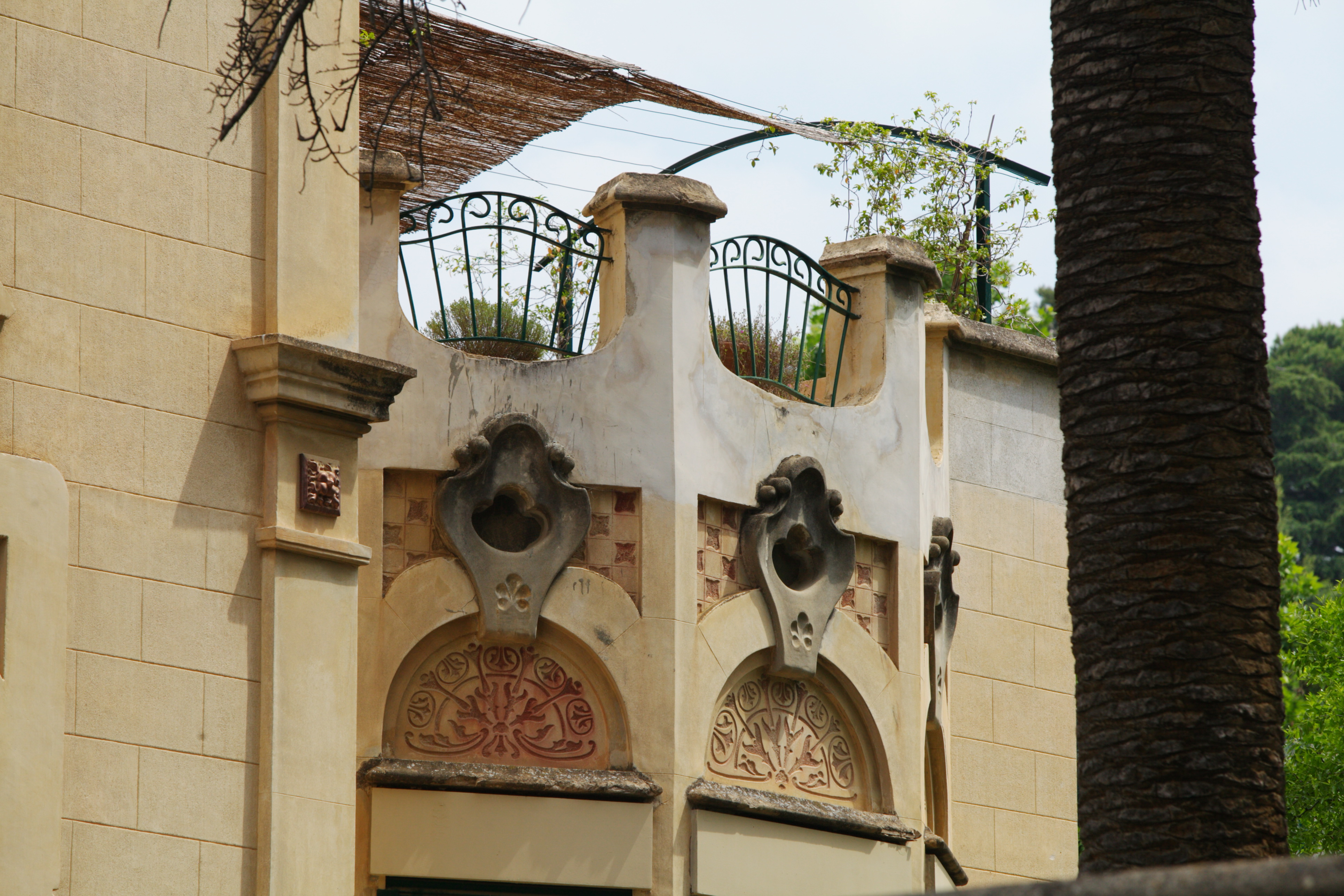
Torre Sant Miquel, la Garriga (1912)

== Death and memorials ==
Coquillat died aged 60 on 28 December 1924 at Busot, Alacantí.

The town of Elche honoured Coquillat with the title "Hijo Predilecto" (most favourite son) in 1905, and erected monuments to him in the town hall and the church. A street in the town is named after Coquillat.
