= Illa de la Discòrdia =

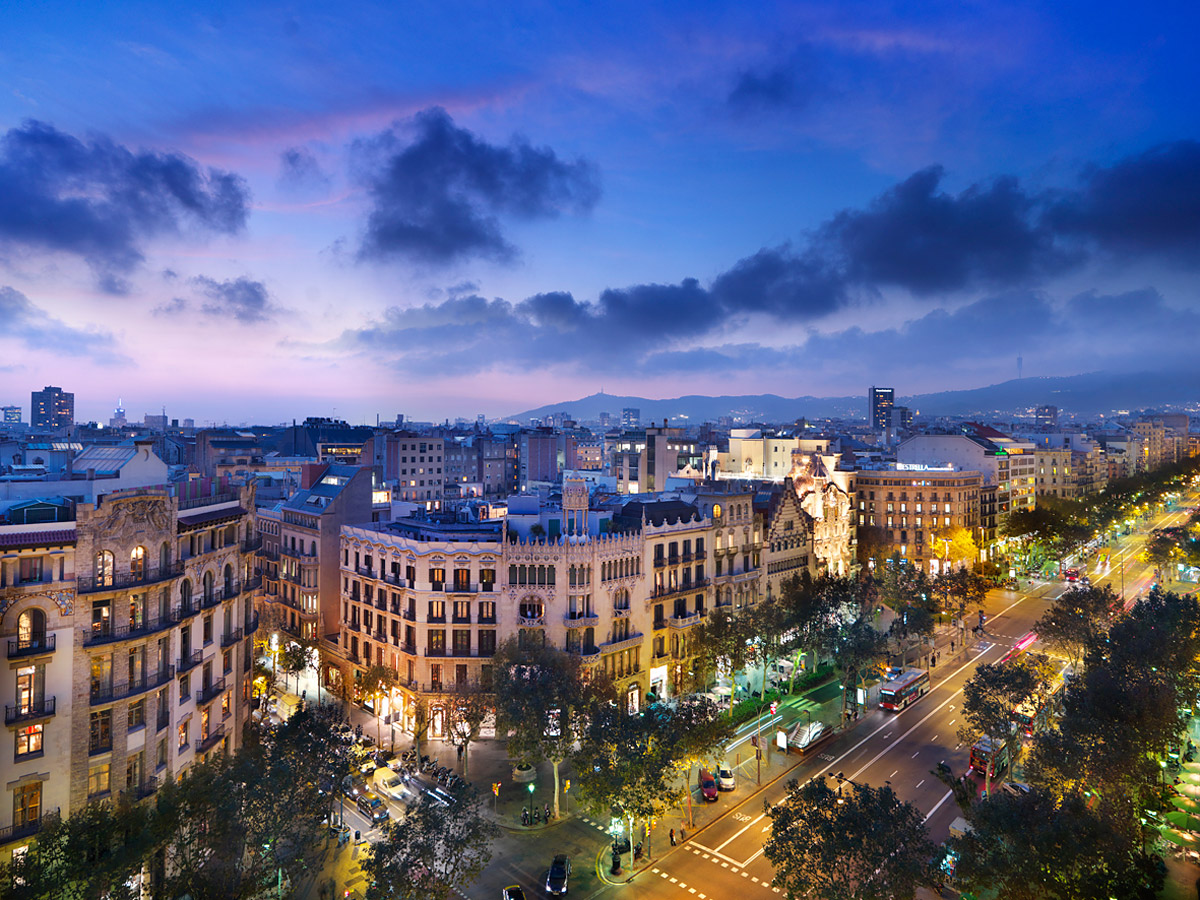
- Illa de la Discòrdia

- Location within Barcelona
- Alternative names: Mansana de la Discòrdia

General information
- Type: Row of town houses
- Architectural style: Modernisme, Eclectic, Neoclassical, Neo-Baroque
- Location: Eixample, Passeig de Gràcia 35-43, Barcelona, Spain
- Coordinates: 41.39143°N 2.16517°E
- Construction started: 1877
- Completed: 1915
- Renovated: 1906

Design and construction
- Architects: Jaume Brossa; Josep Puig i Cadafalch; Lluís Domènech i Montaner; Pau Martorell
- Designations: Bien de Interés Cultural; UNESCO World Heritage Site (Casa Batlló)

Renovating team
- Architects: Marceliano Coquillat; Antoni Gaudí; Enric Sagnier

The Illa de la Discòrdia (Catalan pronunciation: [ˈiʎə ðə lə disˈkɔɾði.ə]) or Mansana de la Discòrdia [mənˈsanə ðə lə disˈkɔɾði.ə] — "Block of Discord"; Spanish: Manzana de la Discordia — is a city block on Passeig de Gràcia in the Eixample district of Barcelona, Catalonia, Spain. The block is noted for having buildings by four of Barcelona's most important Modernista architects, Lluís Domènech i Montaner, Antoni Gaudí, Josep Puig i Cadafalch and Enric Sagnier, in close proximity. As the four architects' styles were very different, the buildings clash with each other and the neighboring buildings. They were all built in the early years of the 20th century.

The block is the southwest side of Passeig de Gràcia, between Carrer del Consell de Cent and Carrer d'Aragó.

== Name ==
The name of the block label dates from the turn of the twentieth century, when much of the local press greatly satirized the new architectural styles of Modernisme.

The words "illa" and "mansana" both provide a play on words. "Illa de la discòrdia" is a Catalan expression that corresponds with the English expression "bone of contention," but also literally means "block of discord." Similarly, "mansana de la discòrdia" is a pun that means both "block of discord" and "apple of discord," referring to the golden Apple of Discord in the Judgment of Paris, a Greek myth in which three goddesses participate in a competition to determine which of them is the fairest. Calling the area the "Apple of Discord" thus refers to the presence of the major Modernista architects all competing for the most impressive architecture (and their styles clashing) on the same city block.

== History ==
The Illa de la Discòrdia

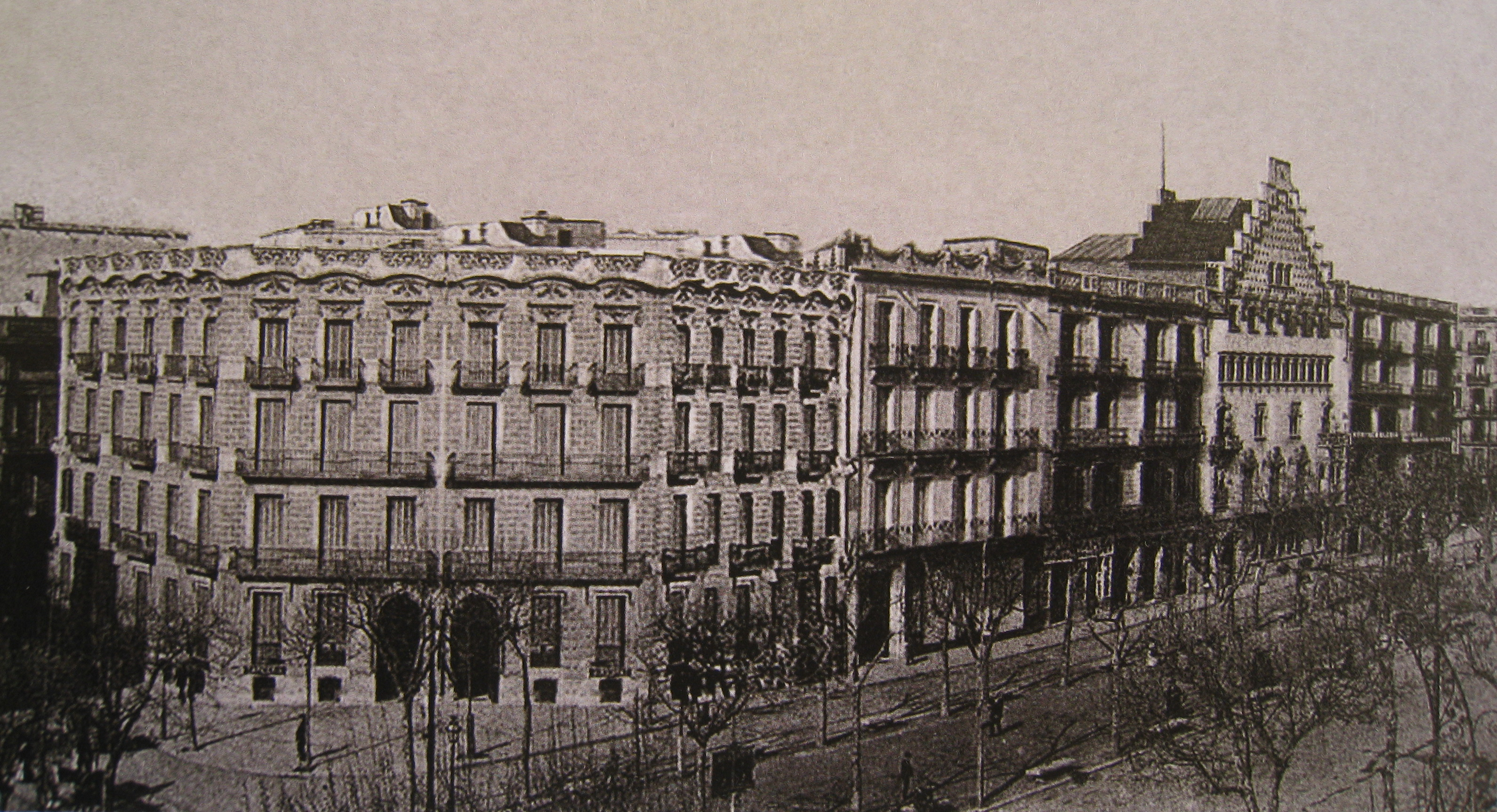
35-43 Passeig de Gràcia pictured in 1902 ...

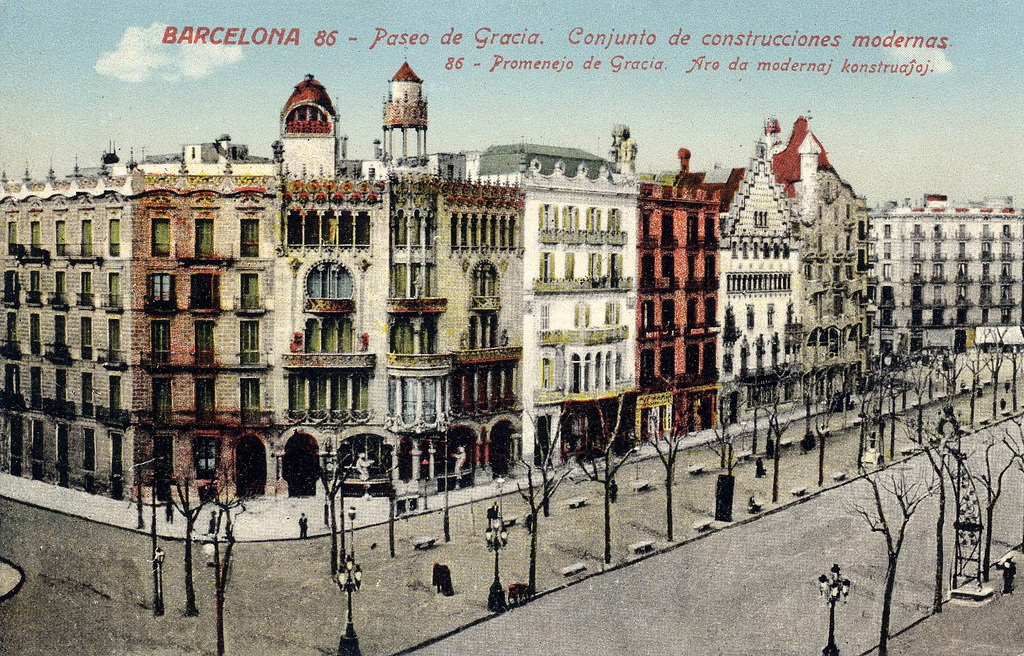
... and in 1910, after the remodelling of the Casa Lleó Morera and the Casa Batlló

When Barcelona was expanding in the 19th century, the Eixample became a highly fashionable district. Wealthy families moved into large properties lining the Passeig de Gràcia, a tree-lined boulevard that served as the area's main thoroughfare and commercial centre. A vogue emerged for refurbishing existing buildings for use as family homes, and many affluent homeowners commissioned prominent architects of the burgeoning Modernista movement to remodel their homes in an often conspicuously opulent style.

The first house on the block at 35-43 Passeig de Gràcia to be remodelled in the Modernista style was Casa Amatller. It was originally built in 1875 in a relatively plain style, conforming to the guidelines laid out in Ildefons Cerdà's 1860 building regulations for the expansion of the Eixample district. In 1898, the Amatller Family commissioned the architect Puig i Cadafalch to carry out a complete transformation of the façade, the ground and first floors. Cadafalch created a striking new frontage in a Flemish Gothic style with a high stepped gable, ceramic tiles and sculpted animal figures. In contemporary photographs, Casa Amatller can be seen protruding above an otherwise relatively uniform terrace of houses.

Within a short period, the vogue for Modernista renovations transformed the block from an unremarkable terrace of houses into a showpiece of new architecture. In 1905, the Catalan Modernista Lluís Domènech i Montaner completed his remodelling of the Casa Lleó Morera at the southern end of the block on the corner of Carrer Consell de Cent in a florid, eclectic style with ceramic tiles. Enric Sagnier's 1906 redesign of Casa Mulleras at number 37 was comparatively restrained, adding a sober Neoclassical frontage with a Rococo-style loggia.

The renovations completed in 1906 on the house at number 43 were the most striking; originally built in 1877, the house was bought by textile industrialist Josep Batlló in 1900. Following the fashion for house renovations and keen to commission a design that would be conspicuously different from his neighbours' properties, Batlló appointed the audacious Catalan Modernista architect Antoni Gaudí to carry out the work. Gaudí's redesign drew on Modernisme and Art Nouveau, creating a dramatic facade of flowing, sculpted stonework and a colourful, organic roof in the form of a dragon's arched back.

The last house to undergo remodelling was Casa Torruella at number 37, now known as Casa Bonet. It was altered by Marcel·lí Coquillat in 1915. By this time, Coquillat had abandoned the ideals of the Modernista and had become an adherent of Noucentisme, a movement that reacted against Modernisme, and his renovations of Casa Bonet are in a much more restrained Neo-Baroque style which is overshadowed by more opulent neighbouring properties.

== Architecture ==
The houses are the Casa Lleó-Morera, at Passeig de Gràcia 35, designed by Lluís Domènech i Montaner; Casa Mulleras, at Passeig de Gràcia 37, designed by Enric Sagnier; Casa Bonet, at Passeig de Gràcia 39, designed by Marcel·lí Coquillat i Llofriu; Casa Amatller, at Passeig de Gràcia 41, designed by Josep Puig i Cadafalch; and Casa Batlló, at Passeig de Gràcia 43, designed by Antoni Gaudí. Due to the presence of these famous landmark buildings, the block is a significant tourist attraction in Barcelona.

Buildings of the Illa de la Discòrdia, Barcelona

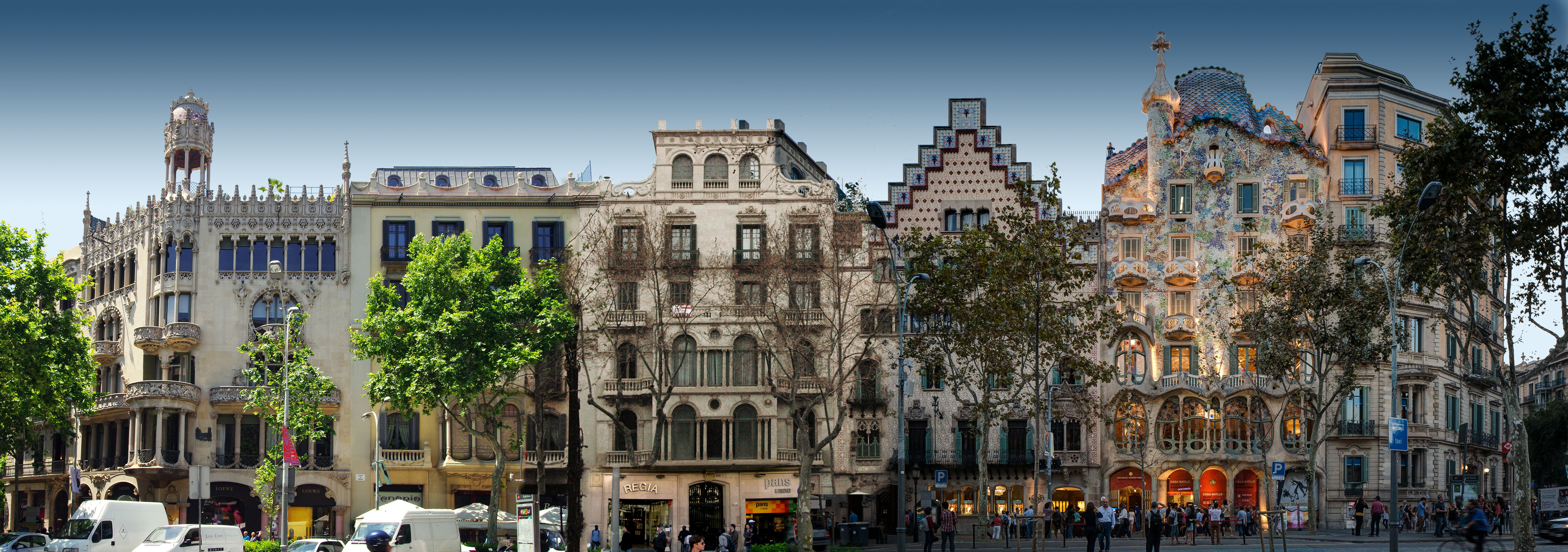
Illa de la Discòrdia

Casa Lleó Morera
Pg. de Gràcia 35
Lluís Domènech i Montaner
(1905)
Casa Mulleras
Pg. de Gràcia 37
Enric Sagnier
(1906)
Casa Bonet
Pg. de Gràcia 39
Marceliano Coquillat
(1901/1915)
Casa Amatller
Pg. de Gràcia 41
Josep Puig i Cadafalch
(1900)
Casa Batlló
Pg. de Gràcia 43
Antoni Gaudí
(1877/1906)

== See also ==
- List of Modernisme buildings in Barcelona
- List of Gaudí buildings
