= Passeig de Gràcia =

Major avenue in Barcelona, Spain

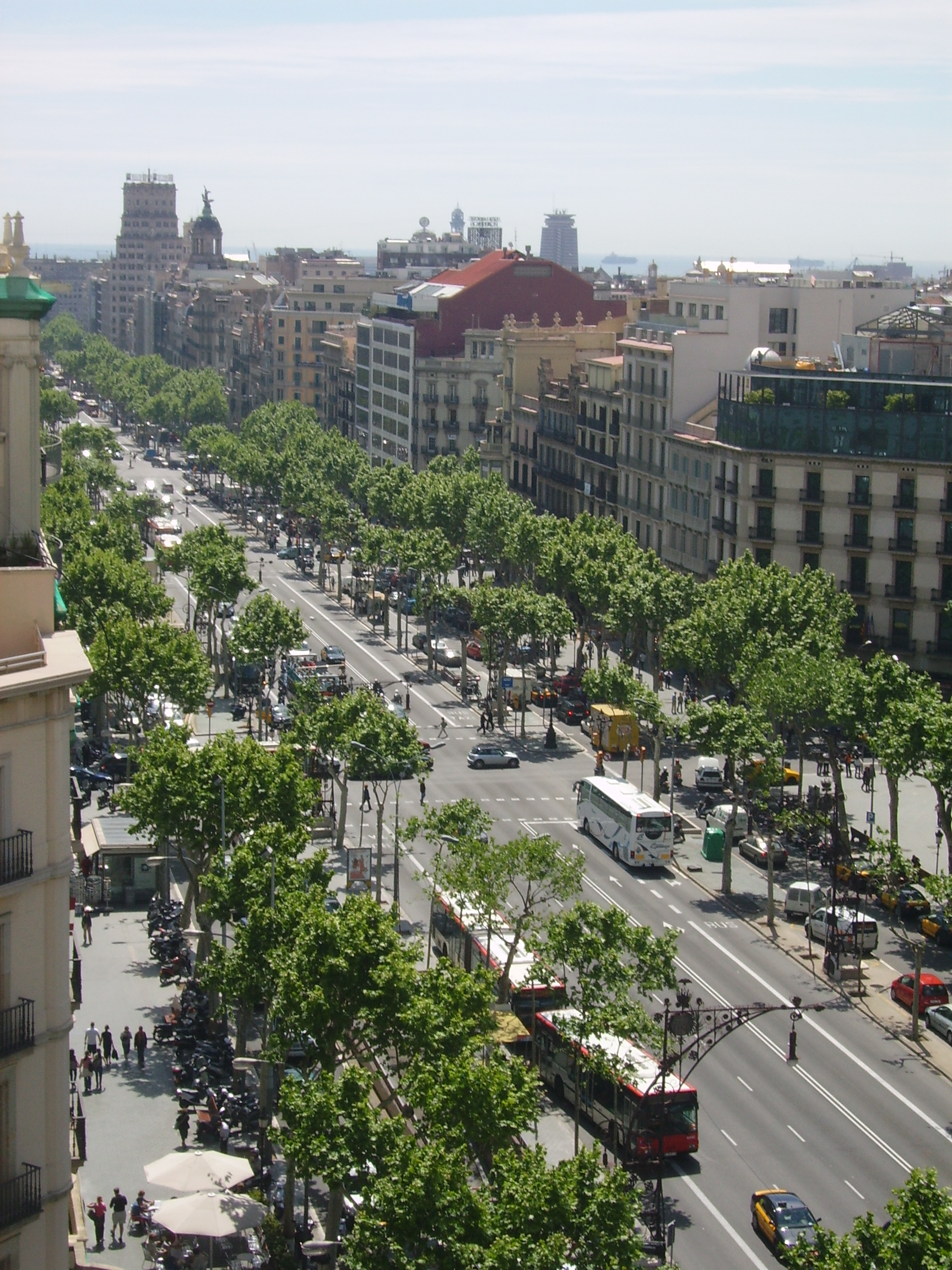
- Passeig de Gràcia viewed from Casa Milà
- Interactive map of Passeig de Gràcia
- Length: 1.3 km (0.81 mi)
- Location: Barcelona, Catalonia, Spain
- Coordinates: 41°23′34″N 02°09′49″E
- From: Plaça Catalunya
- To: Carrer Gran de Gràcia

Passeig de Gràcia (Catalan pronunciation: [pəˈsɛdʒ də ˈgɾasi.ə]) is one of the major avenues in Barcelona (Catalonia, Spain) and one of its most important shopping and business areas, containing several of the city's most celebrated pieces of architecture. It is located in the central part of Eixample, stretching from Plaça Catalunya to Carrer Gran de Gràcia.

Passeig de Gràcia is regarded as the most expensive street in Barcelona and in Spain.

== History ==
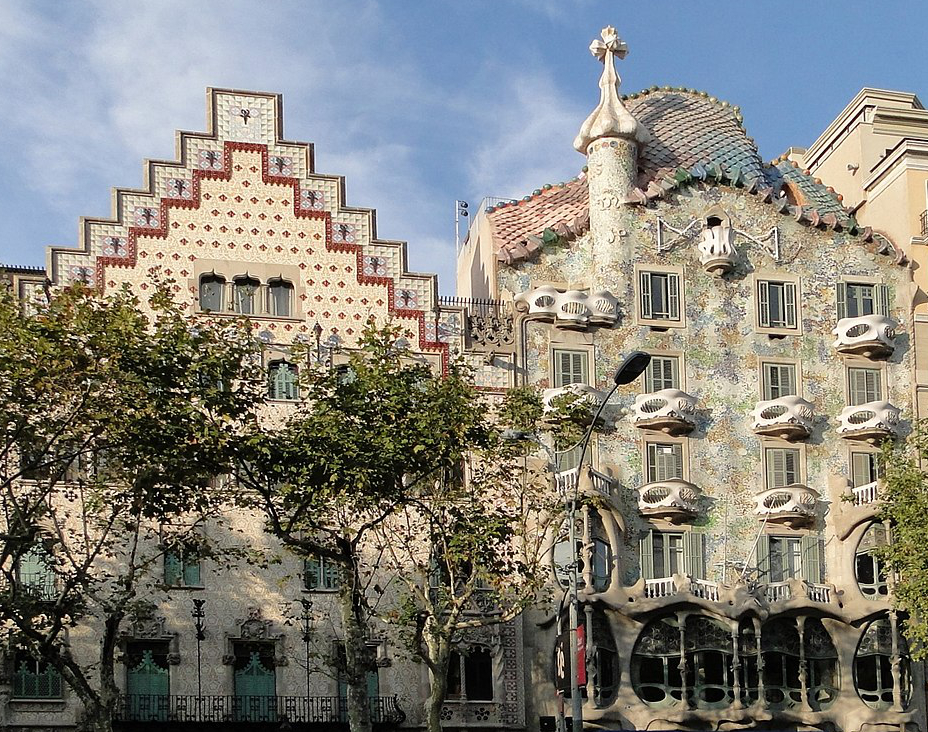
Casa Amatller and Casa Batlló

Formerly known as Camí de Jesús ("Jesus Road"), the Passeig de Gràcia was originally little more than a quasi-rural lane surrounded by gardens joining Barcelona and Gràcia, which was then still a separate town. This was still the case at the time of the first urbanisation project in 1821, which was devised by the liberal city council, and led by Ramon Plana. This project had to be cancelled due to the epidemics that were raging in Barcelona at the time.

After the demise of the liberal government with the return of Absolutism in 1824, the project was taken up again by general José Bernaldo de Quirós, marquis of Campo Sagrado. The new avenue was 42 metres (138 ft) wide in 1827 and became a favourite place for aristocrats to display their horse riding skills and expensive horse-drawn carriages all through the 19th century.

In 1906 the architect Pere Falqués i Urpí designed the avenue's now famous ornate benches and street-lights. By that time it had become Barcelona's most fashionable street, with buildings designed by modernista/Art Nouveau architects of fame such as Antoni Gaudí, Pere Falqués, Josep Puig i Cadafalch, Lluís Domènech i Montaner, Enric Sagnier and Josep Vilaseca.

The government of the Basque Country (Eusko Jaurlaritza) was based in Passeig de Gràcia, 60 during the Spanish Civil War. The Catalan poet Salvador Espriu resided in Casa Fuster (Passeig de Gràcia, 132).

== Notable buildings ==
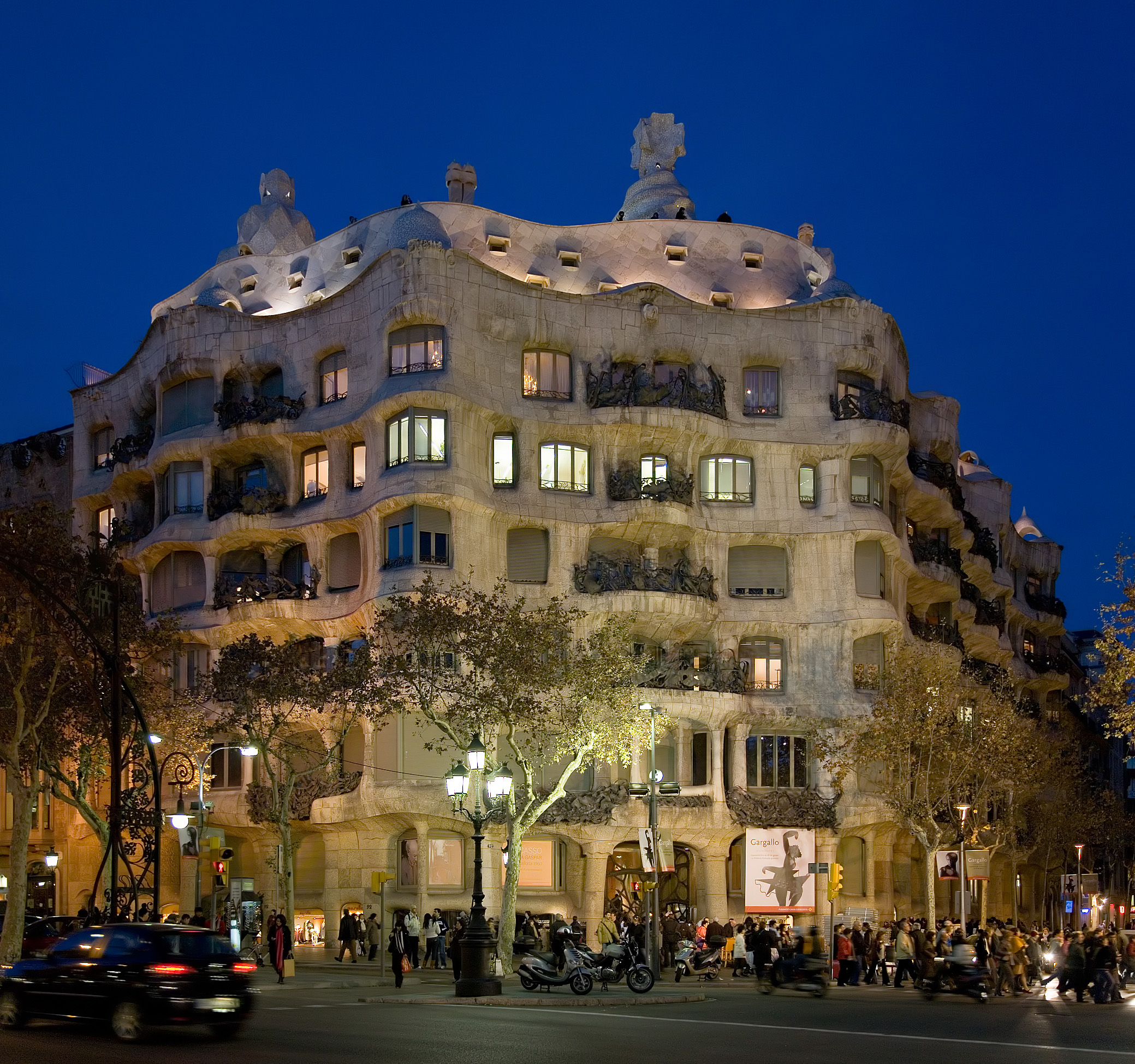
Casa Milà

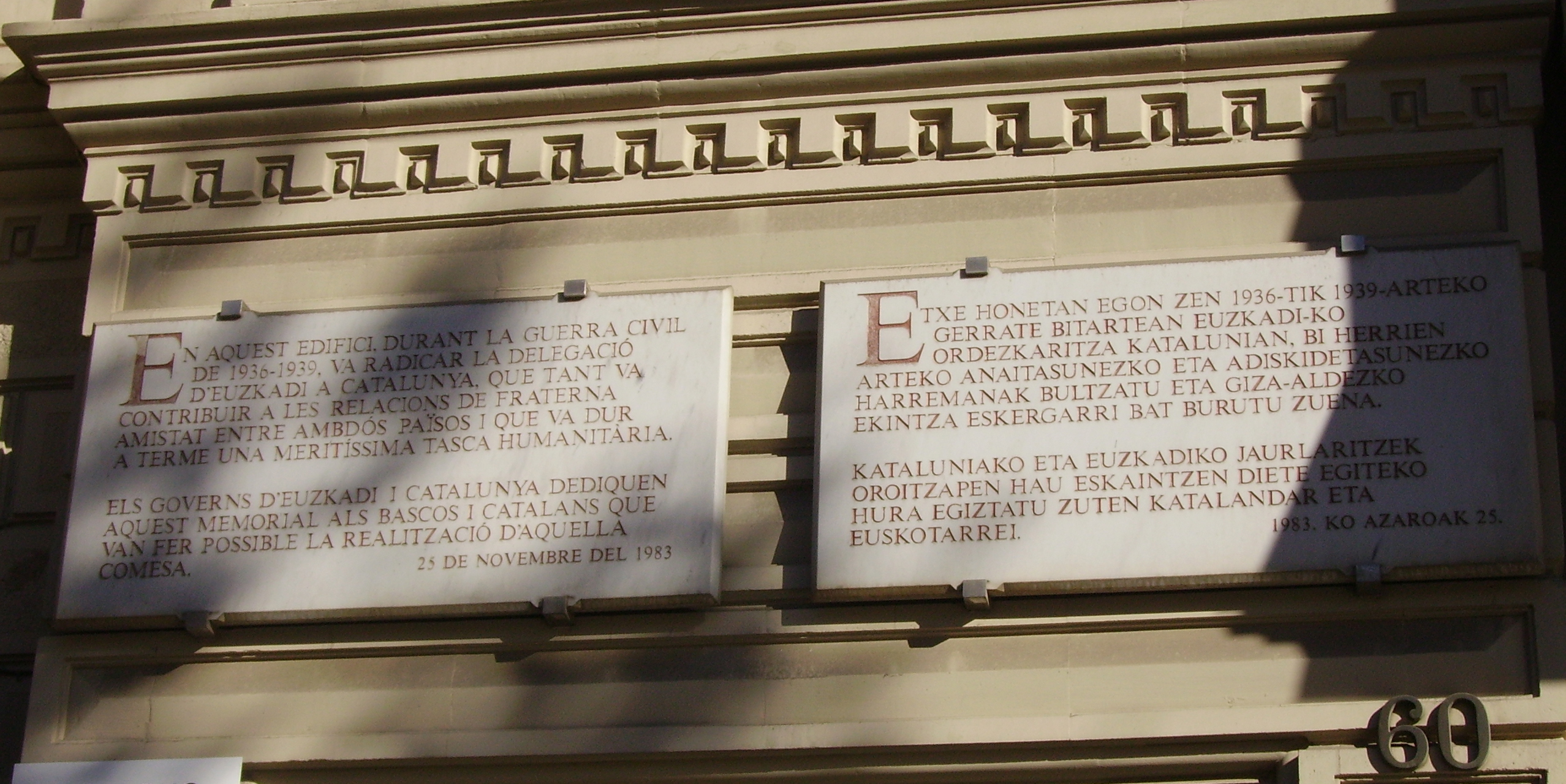
Eusko Jaurlaritza commemorative plaque.

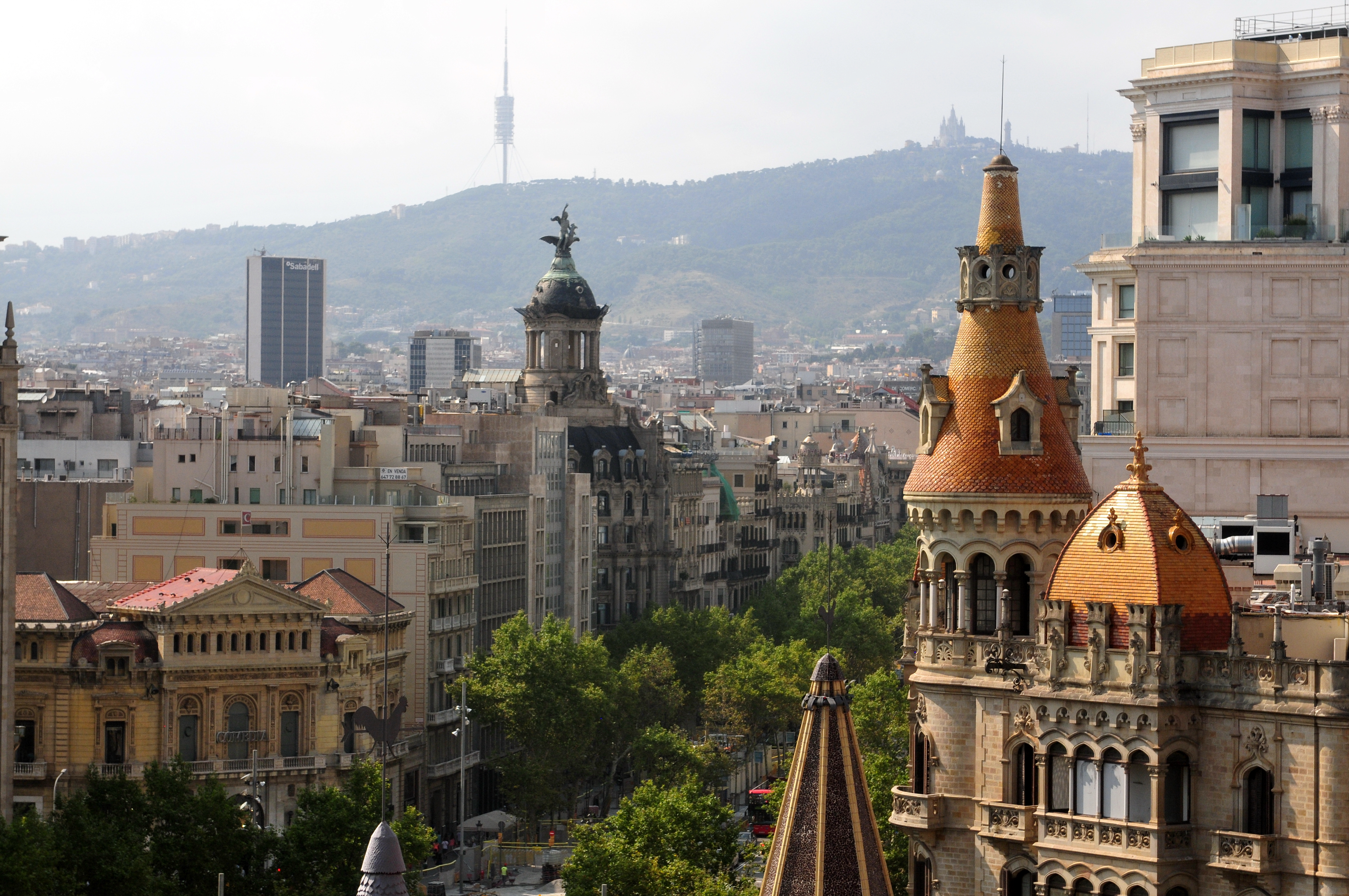
Cases Rocamora

- Illa de la Discòrdia
  - Casa Amatller by Josep Puig i Cadafalch (1890-1900)
  - Casa Batlló by Antoni Gaudí (1904-1906)
  - Casa Lleó Morera by Lluís Domènech i Montaner (1902-1906)
  - Museu del Perfum
- Cases Antoni Rocamora by Josep Bassegoda i Amigó (1914-1917)
- Casa Bonaventura Ferrer by Pere Falqués i Urpí (1906)
- Casa Fuster by Josep Puig i Cadafalch (1908-1911)
- Casa Milà "La Pedrera" by Antoni Gaudí (1905-1910)
- Casa Pons i Pascual by Enric Sagnier (1891)
- Casa Ramon Casas by Antoni Rovira i Rabassa (1898)
- Hotel Majestic (Barcelona) (1918)
- Palau Robert (1903)
- Teatre Tívoli
- Jardins de Salvador Espriu

== Transportation ==
- Passeig de Gràcia (Barcelona Metro)
- Diagonal (Barcelona Metro)
- Passeig de Gràcia train station
- Bus

== See also ==
- Ildefons Cerdà
- Modernisme
- Noucentisme
- Street names in Barcelona
- Urban planning of Barcelona
- List of streets in Eixample

== Hotels ==
- Hotel Majestic. Opened as a hotel in 1918 and owned by the Soldevila family.
- Mandarin Oriental

== Bibliography ==
- ALBAREDA, Joaquim, GUÀRDIA, Manel i altres.Enciclopèdia de Barcelona, Gran Enciclopèdia Catalana, Barcelona, 2006.
