= Casa Mulleras =

House in Barcelona, Spain

- Casa Mulleras
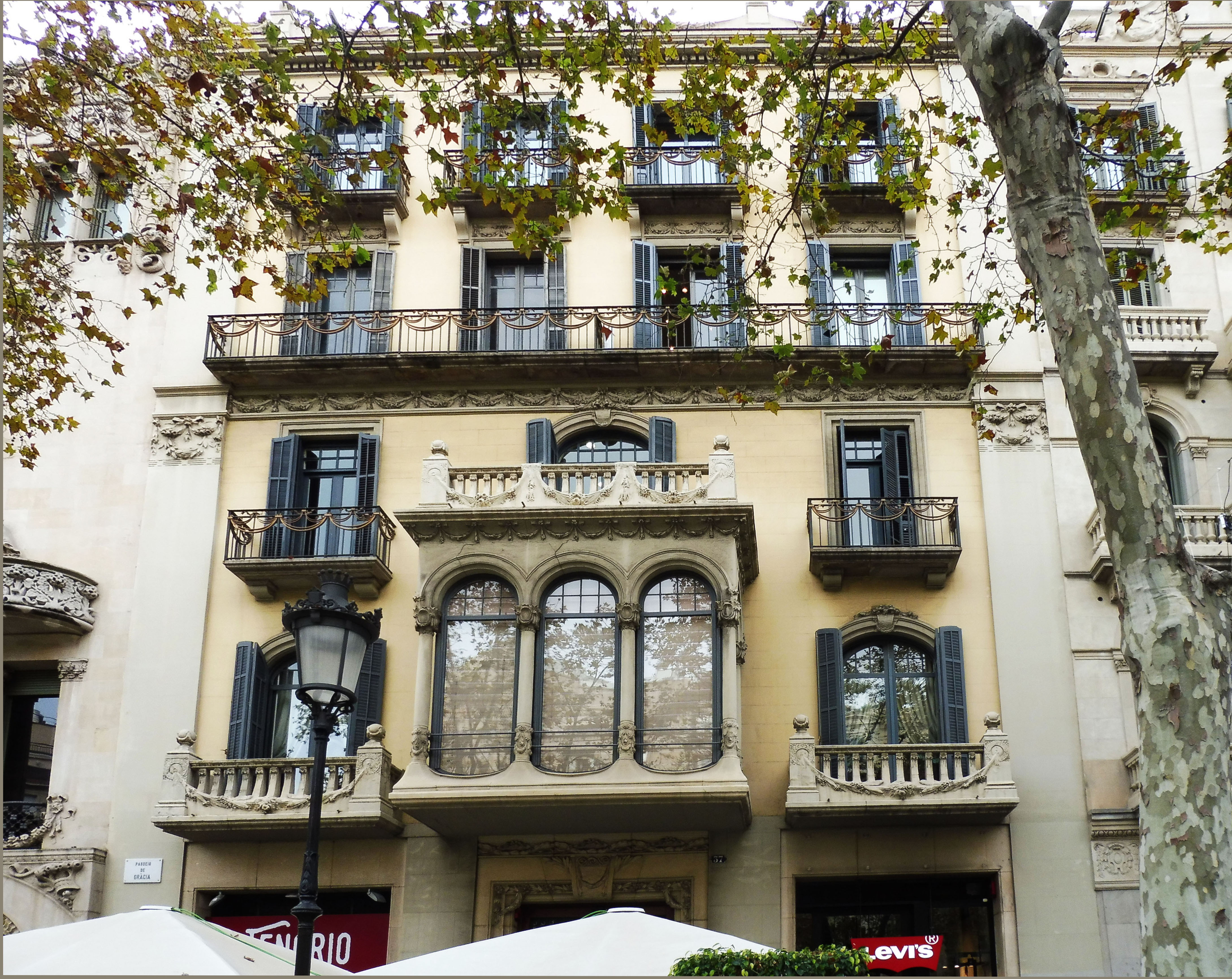
- Casa Mulleras

- Location within Barcelona
- Alternative names: Casa Ramon Mulleras

General information
- Type: Town house
- Location: Passeig de Gràcia 37, Barcelona, Spain
- Coordinates: 41.39134°N 2.16532°E
- Completed: 1868
- Renovated: 1906-11
- Client: Ramon Mulleras

Technical details
- Material: stone

Design and construction
- Designations: Bé Cultural d'Interès Local (BCIL) 08019/1516

Renovating team
- Architect: Enric Sagnier

Casa Mulleras is a house in Barcelona, Spain, located on the Passeig de Gràcia in the Eixample district. Originally built in 1868, it was remodelled in a Neoclassical style by Enric Sagnier between 1906 and 1911. The house forms part of a row of buildings known as the Illa de la Discòrdia (or Mansana de la Discòrdia, the "Block of Discord").

The Illa de la Discòrdia derives its name from its clashing architectural styles, and while the block is best known for its Modernista architecture (most notably Antoni Gaudí's Casa Batlló of 1906), the more sober Neoclassical style of Casa Mulleras contrasts sharply with its more opulent neighbours.

== History ==
The Ramon Comas house was originally built by Pau Martorell in 1868. In 1906 it was acquired by Ramon Mulleras who commissioned Enric Sagnier to renovate the facade. While Sagnier's architectural portfolio included buildings designed in a variety of styles, including Gothic Revival and the Modernista style, he redesigned Casa Mulleras in a Neoclassical style, completing his work in 1911. Despite its relatively restrained design in comparison to the neighbouring properties, Casa Mulleras incorporates some eclectic features derived from Rococo architecture such as the gallery and the balconies.
