= Casa Amatller =

Historic house and museum in Barcelona

Coordinates: 41°23′30″N 2°09′54″E

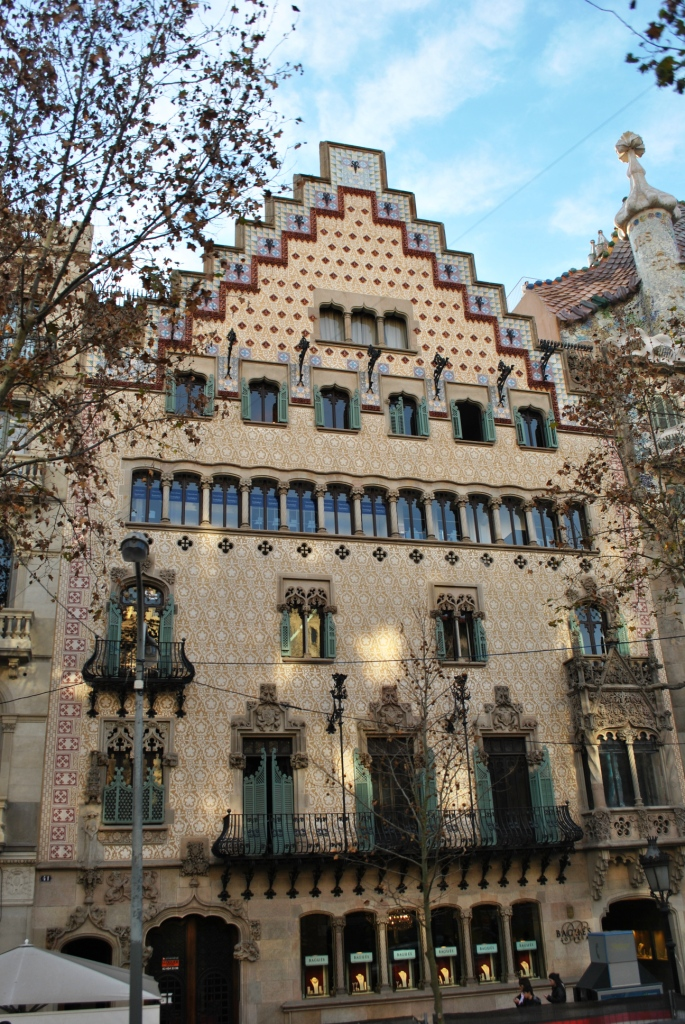
- Interactive map of the Casa Amatller area

General information
- Location: Barcelona, Spain

Design and construction
- Architect: Josep Puig i Cadafalch

Spanish Cultural Heritage
- Type: Non-movable
- Criteria: Monument
- Designated: 9 January 1976
- Reference no.: RI-51-0004199

Casa Amatller (Catalan pronunciation: [ˈkazə əməˈʎːe]) is a building in the Modernisme style in Barcelona, Catalunya, Spain, designed by renowned Catalan architect Josep Puig i Cadafalch. Along with Casa Batlló and Casa Lleó-Morera, it makes up the three most important buildings in Barcelona's famous Illa de la Discòrdia ("Block of Discord"), noted for its unique, contrasting modern buildings.

The building was originally constructed in 1875, then redesigned as a residence for wealthy chocolatier and archaeological enthusiast Antoni Amatller between 1898 and 1900. After his death in 1910, it remained the home of Amatller's daughter until her death in 1960. The continuous ownership by the Amatller family meant that the house's interior of 1900 has remained largely preserved intact to the present day. It now serves as a historic house museum, café, and the Amatller Institute for Hispanic Art, a scholarly study center. The house is regularly open for scheduled tours.

== Gallery ==
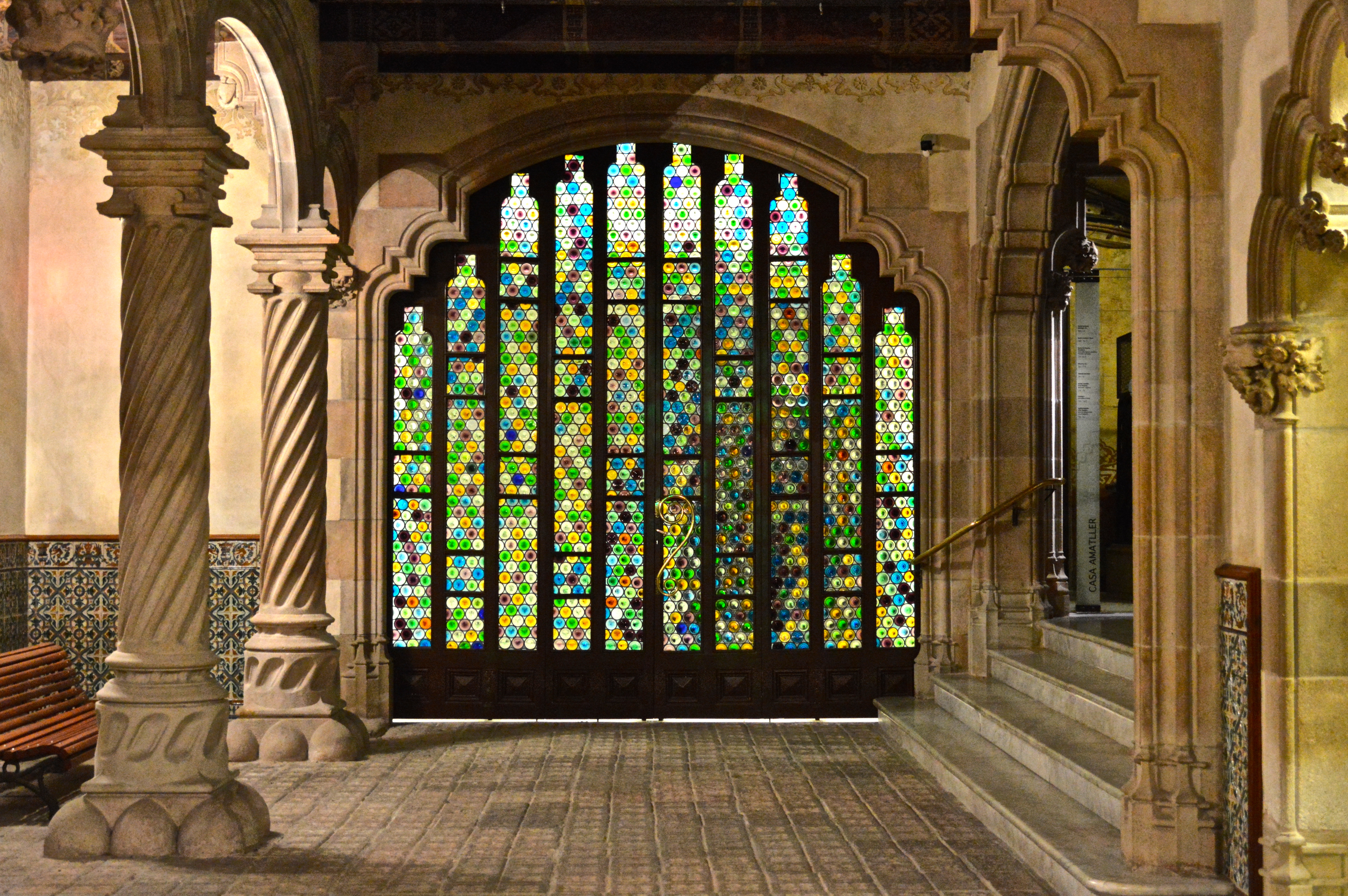
The entrance foyer of the Casa Amatller in Barcelona. The stairs on the right, in front of the large set of stained glass doors, lead to the stair court.

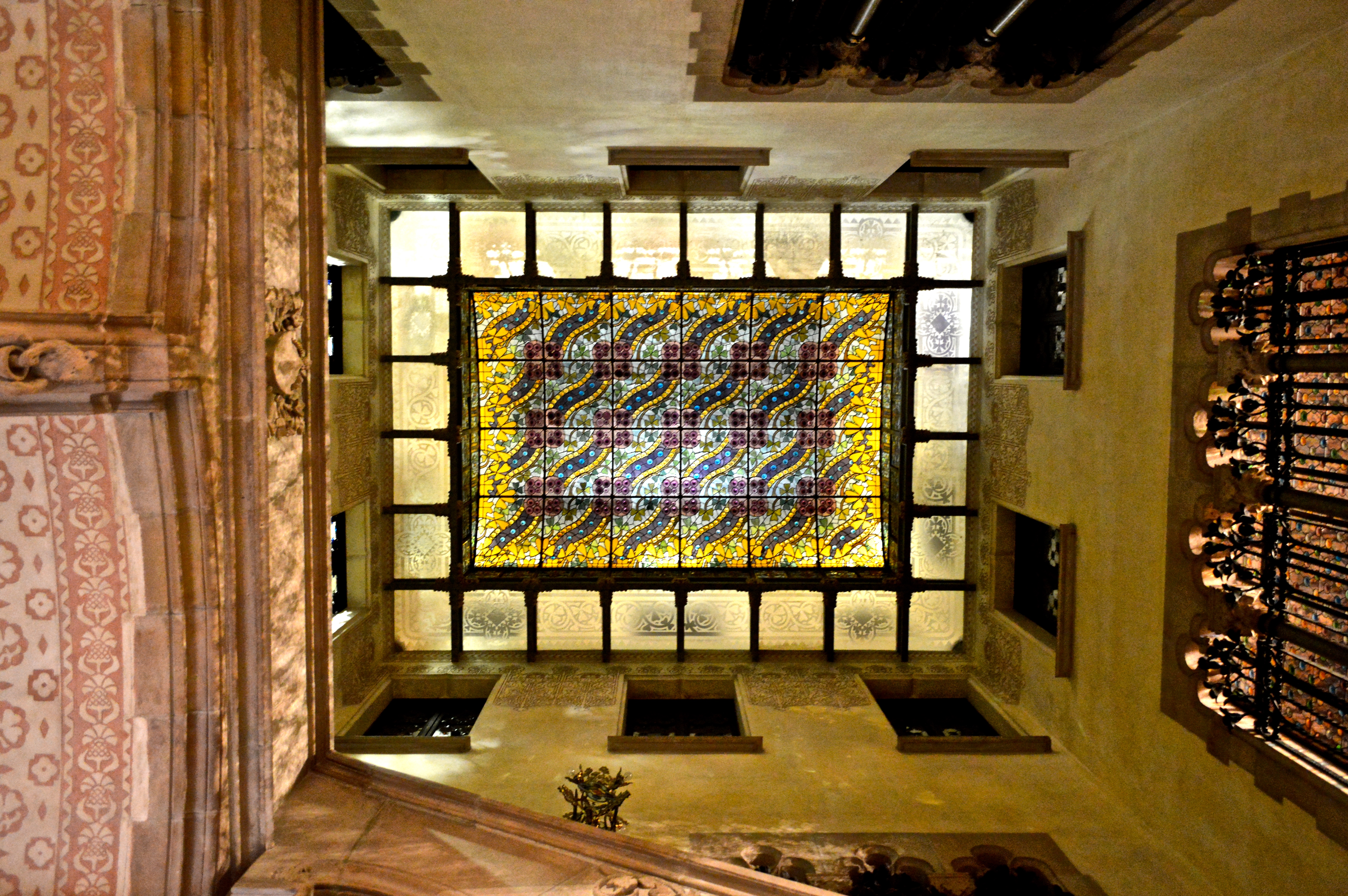
Looking up from the Casa Amatller's stair court, at the stained glass ceiling above.

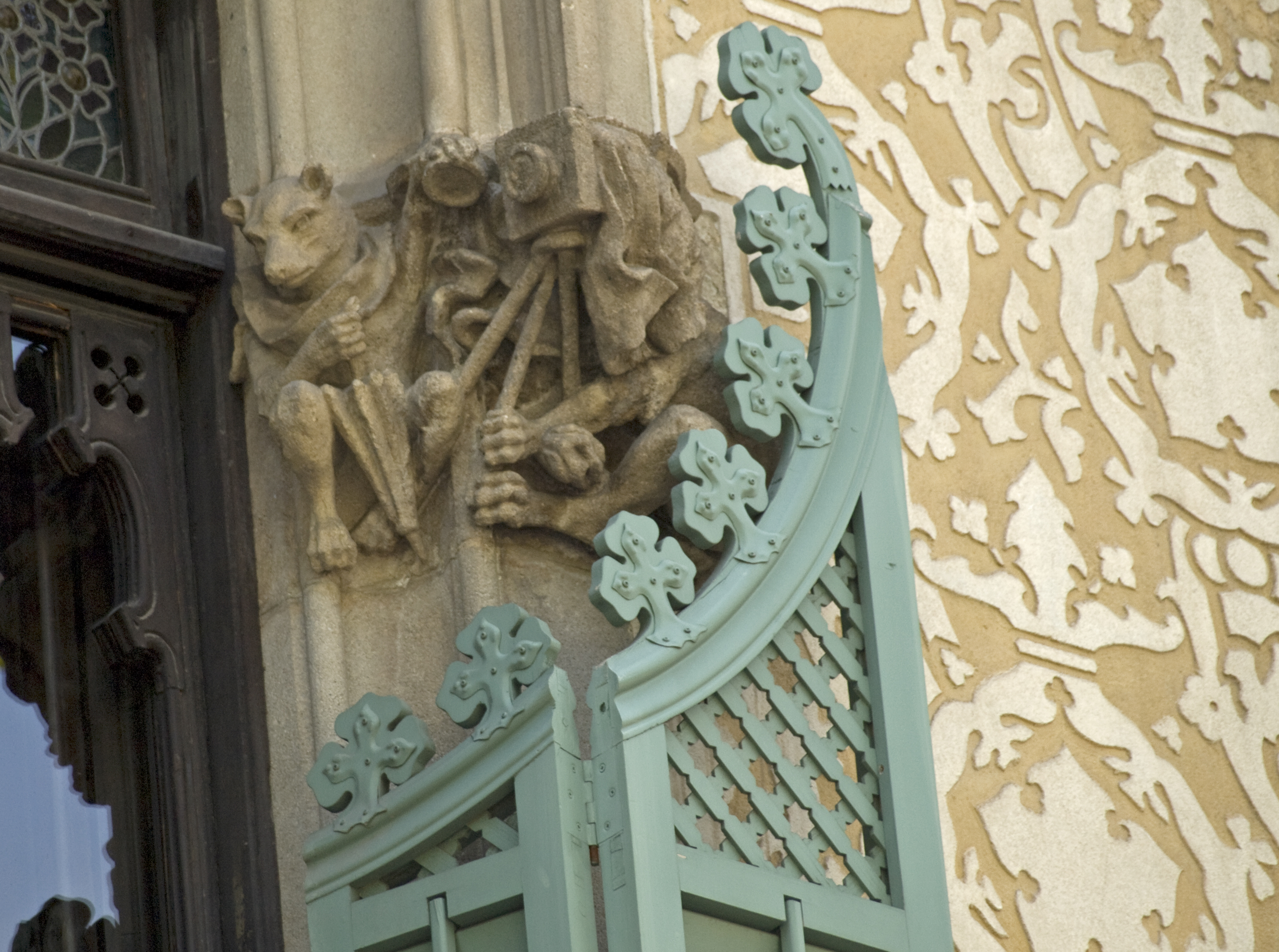
A rat with a camera, one of the sculpture compositions at the main facade

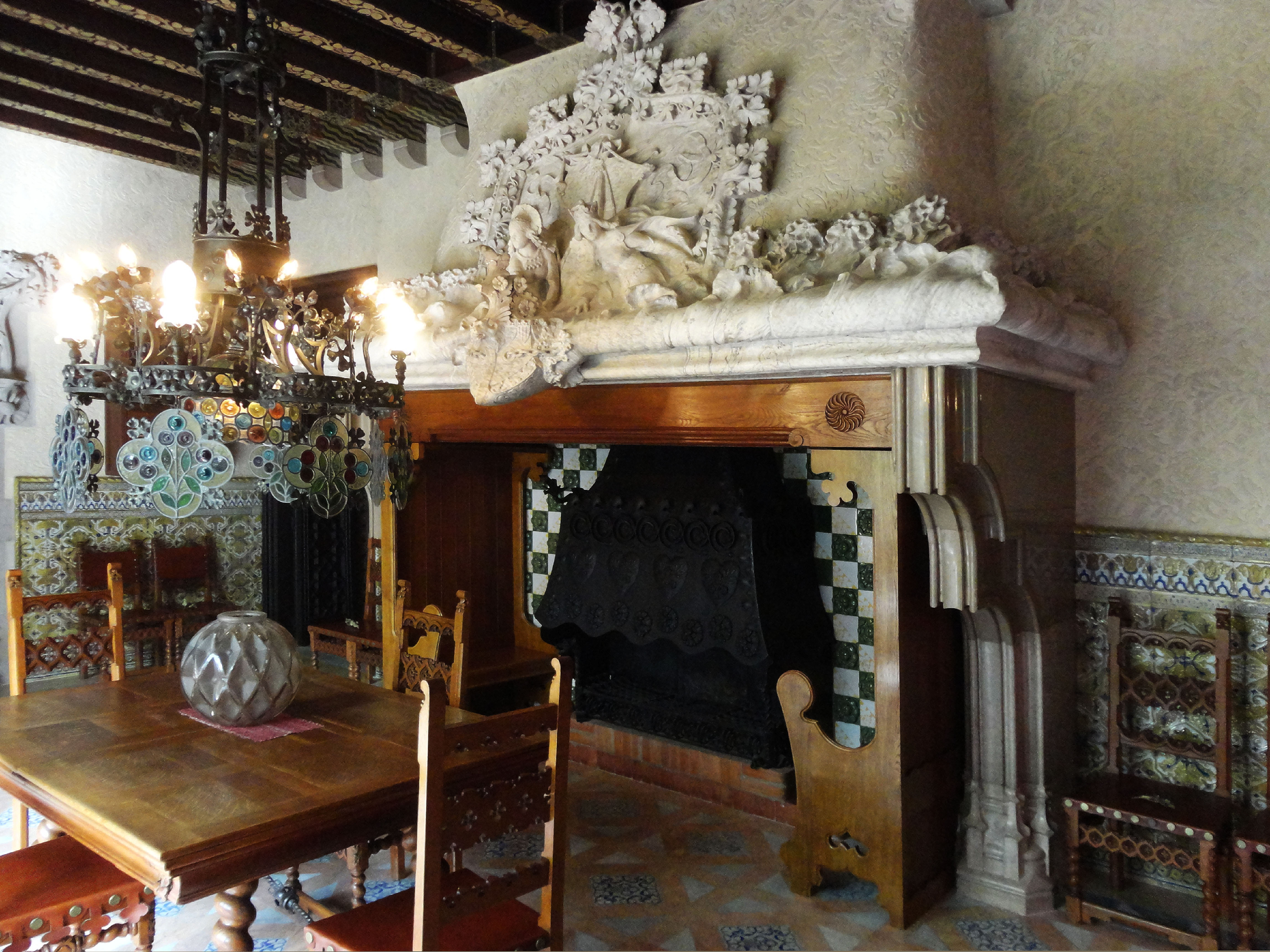
Dining room

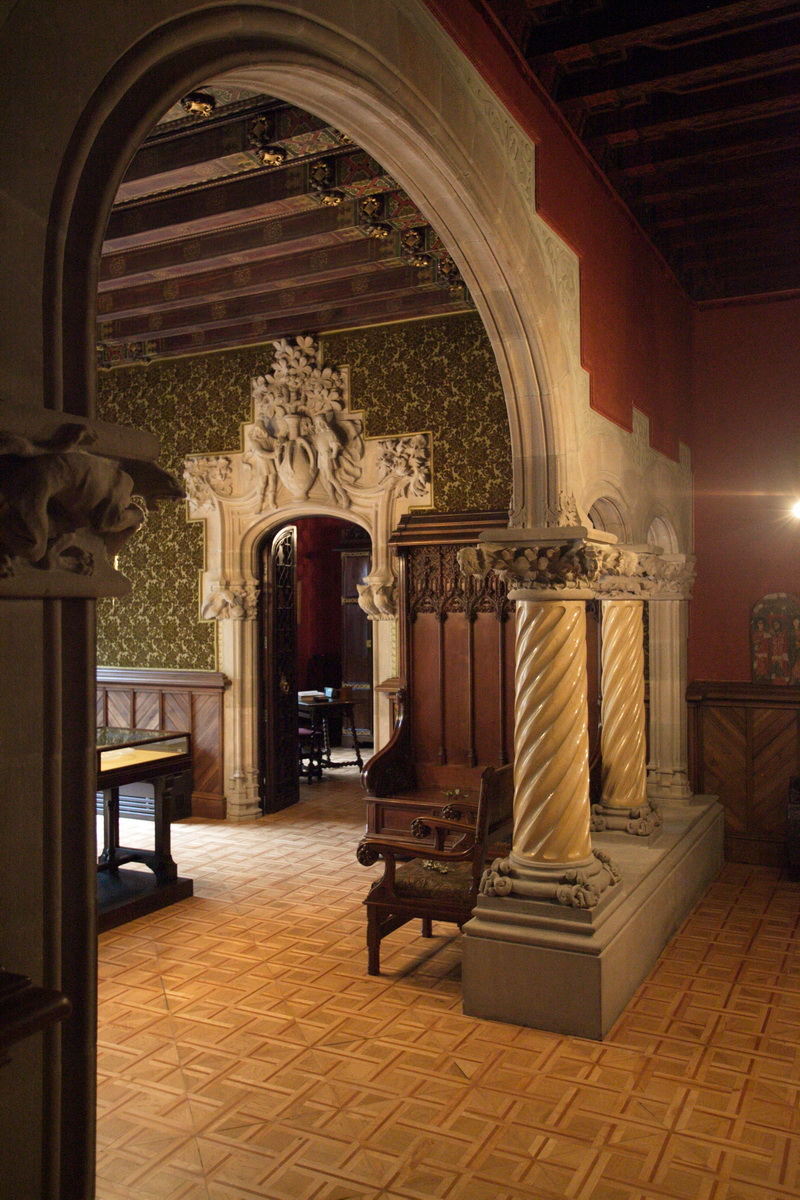
Salon

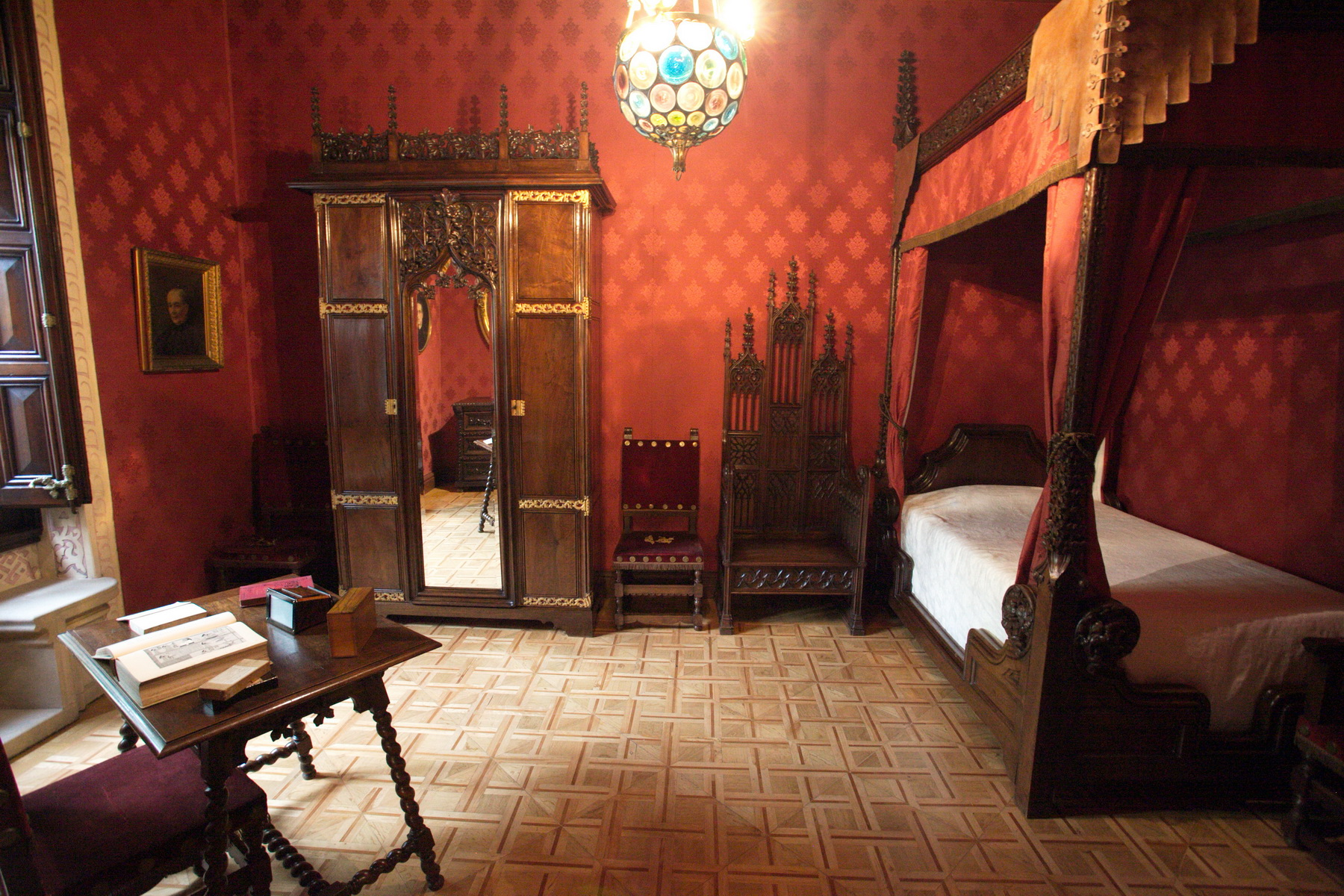
Bedroom of Antoni Amatller

== See also ==
- List of Modernisme buildings in Barcelona
