= Trinxet =

Trinxet may refer to:

- Casa Trinxet: Casa Trinxet was a building designed by the Catalan architect Josep Puig i Cadafalch
- Trinxets are a type of knife used traditionally by peasants in Mallorca, made by a trinxeter
- Joaquin Mir Trinxet (1873 – 1940) was a Spanish modernist artist
