= Terraced Village =

Painting by Joaquim Mir

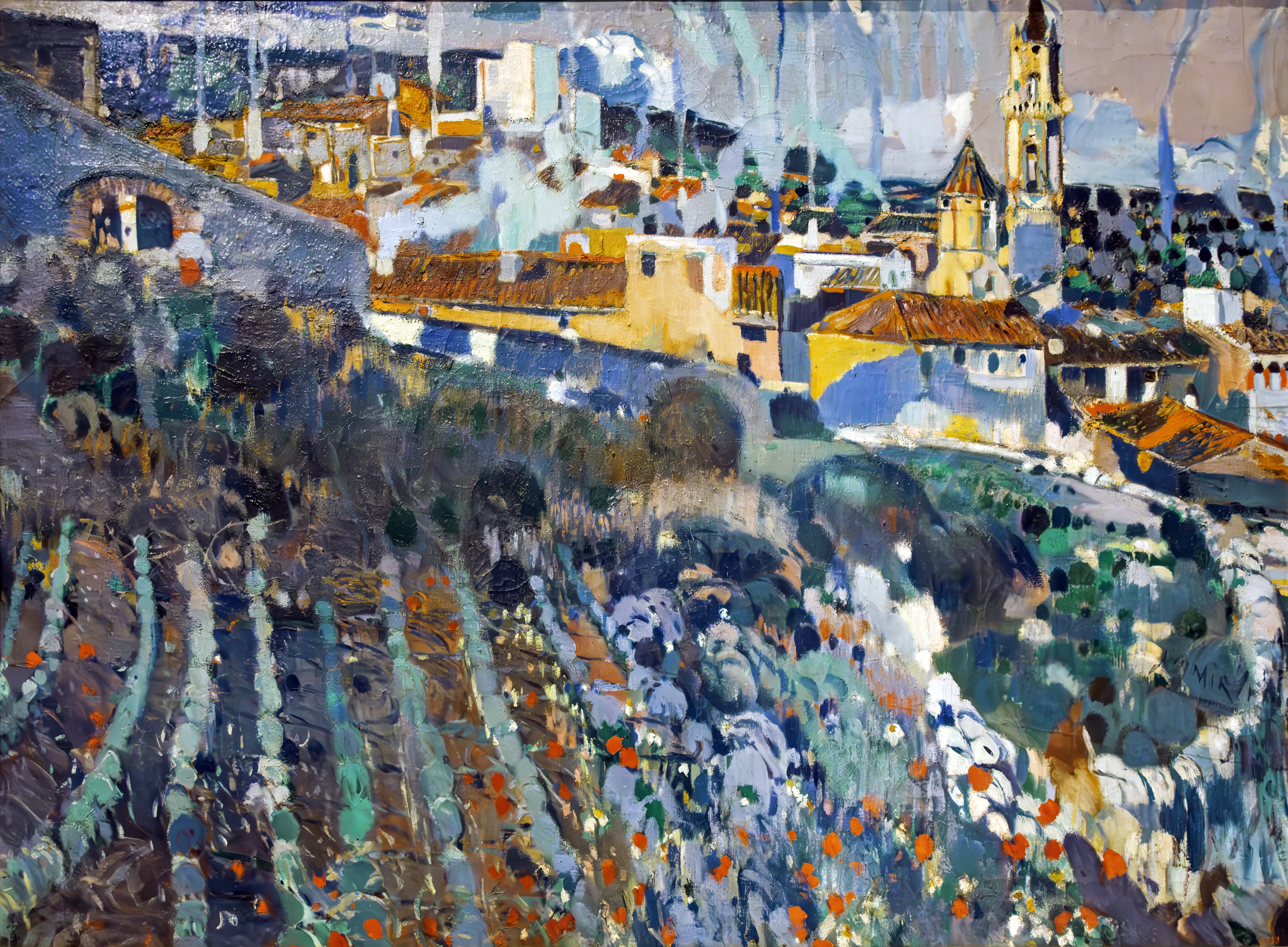
- Artist: Joaquim Mir
- Year: circa 1909
- Medium: Oil on canvas
- Subject: Village of Maspuljos
- Dimensions: 121 cm × 164 cm (48 in × 65 in)
- Condition: Good
- Location: Museu Nacional d'Art de Catalunya; Barcelona
- Website: http://www.museunacional.cat/en/colleccio/terraced-village/joaquim-mir/004633-000

Terraced Village is a painting by Joaquim Mir currently exhibited at the National Art Museum of Catalonia.

== Joaquim Mir ==
Joaquim Mir was a Catalan Spanish artist that is known for his impressionist and modern pieces. When he began painting, his first periods of works were regarding social issues although he is known best for his later works, which were mostly landscapes. For a time he received help from his uncle in exchange for works. He made decorations, murals, and stained glass windows for his uncles home, Casa Trinxet. His first exhibition was in 1901 in Barcelona and while the critical reviews of were positive the public found his works hard to understand. In 1905, he suffered an accident and was admitted to the Pere Mate Psychiatric Institute in Ruis. After his release he moved to the Camp de Tarragona area with this mother and sister. During his time here, his work with landscapes intensified. He participated in solo and group exhibitions and his work began to be accepted by the public.

In 1921, after bouncing around from town to town, he settled permanently in Vilanova I la Geltru. At the Barcelona International Exposition of 1929, he was awarded the first medal and at the National Exhibition of Madrid in 1930 he received the medal of honor for his works. These two awards were considered official recognition of his work. He died of kidney disease in 1940.

== Creation ==
Terraced Village or Poble Escalnot is a view of the village of Mapujols (Tarragona province). It was created during Mir's Camp de Tarragona years (1905 – 1913) after his mental breakdown/accident and hospital stay. Different sources have different dates for when the piece was painted but it has been narrowed down for somewhere in between 1906 and 1909. His landscape paintings from this time are his best known works. They have spurred on the rumors of his mental delirium, saying he lost himself in light and color in an attempt to merge with nature. Within these landscape works, he wanted to establish a vision of nature that no one had ever seen before.

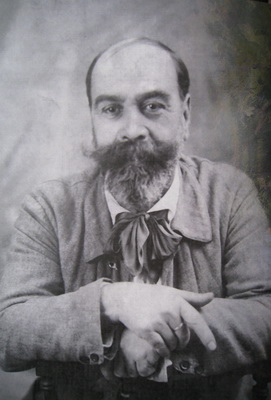
Joaquin Mir Trinxet

== Content ==
Mir used an explosion of pure color as a vivid reflection of his inner feelings. The innovative manner in which he interpreted the landscape stemmed from his great descriptive talent, from an inbred facility for rendering dazzling atmosphere and from an original way of applying patches of bold and vibrant colors, with harmonious chromatic gradations. Many of his impressionist's landscapes from this time period (1905-1913) possess this same use of vibrant color to detail his surroundings. The work displays the village in the background with nature being the forefront of the picture. The viewers eyes are drawn to the bursts of color and the way the artist has recreated the scene in an imaginative way. The artist uses different variations of light and dark to pull the viewers attention towards different areas making for a very dynamic piece.

== Materials ==
Terraced Village is a painting made from oil on canvas. Traditional oil painting techniques often begin with the artist making a sketch of what they are going to paint on the canvas. Depending on the consistency wanted by the artist, the oil paint can be mixed with linseed oil, mineral spirits or other solvents. Usually, the artist creates their own pigments. This allowed Mir to create whatever color he wanted and change colors frequently. Oil paints remain wet longer allowing the artist to change the color, texture and more to whatever they desire. During the Impressionist era, the wet-on-wet/alla prima approach was used. This was created because of outdoor use and allowed the artist to mix the paint directly on the canvas. Traditionally oil paintings are created on canvas that has been stretched over a wooden frame and tacked on.

== Entering Museums ==
The Museum of Modern Art in Barcelona purchased Terraced Village in 1932 as part of the Plandiura Collection. The National Museum of Art of Catalonia now holds the piece in its collection.

== Exhibition History ==
Date	Location	Exhibit
1971	Madrid	
1972	Barcelona	
November 14, 1985 - February 23, 1986	Hayward Gallery, London	Homage to Barcelona: The City and Its Art 1888-1936
Current Location	MNAC	It was on display in the Modern Art gallery before its recent renovation.

== Partage Plus ==
Terraced Village was selected to be a part of Partage Plus: Digitising and Enabling Art Nouvea for Europeana. The project started in March 2012 among 25 partner institutions and was slated to digitize 75,000 items in 24 months. The works selected were European Art Nouveau objects, artworks, posters, and buildings. The project was done to make all of the items available for access through Europeana.

== Related works ==
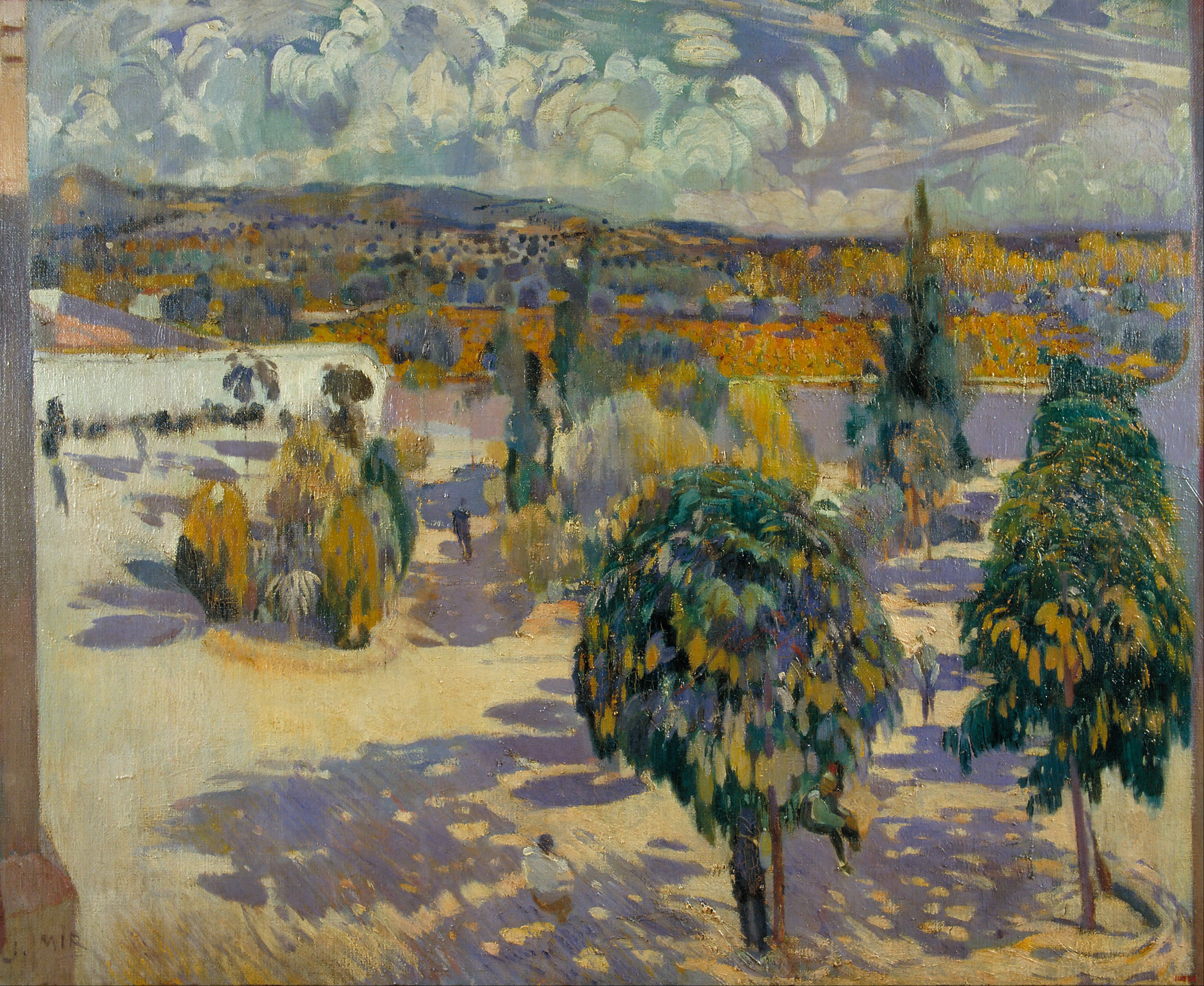
Thundery Sky (circa 1907). 1225 × 1514 mm. Museu Nacional d'Art de Catalunya.

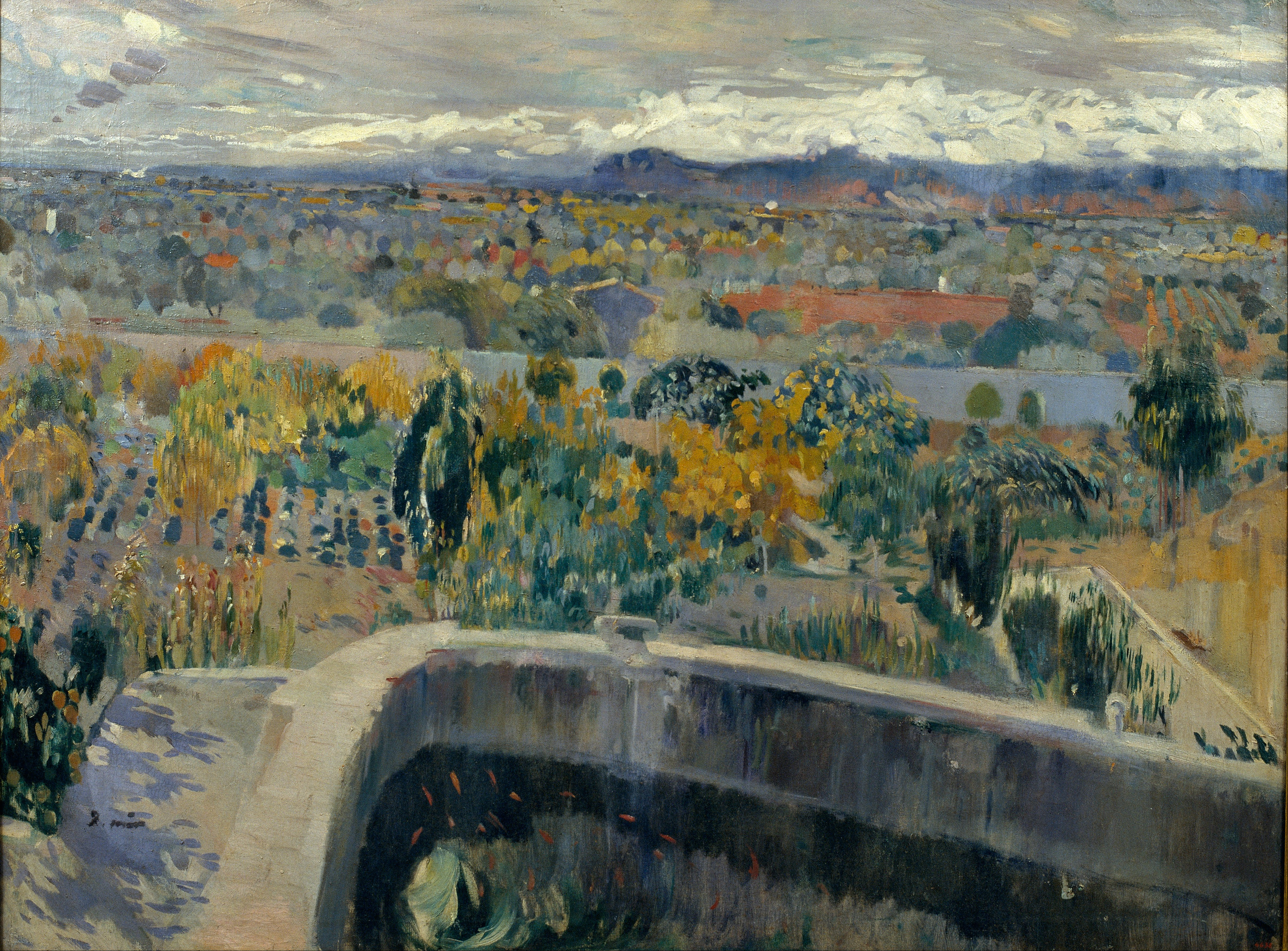
The New Pond (around 1907-1913). 123.5 × 165.5 cm. Museu Nacional d'Art de Catalunya.

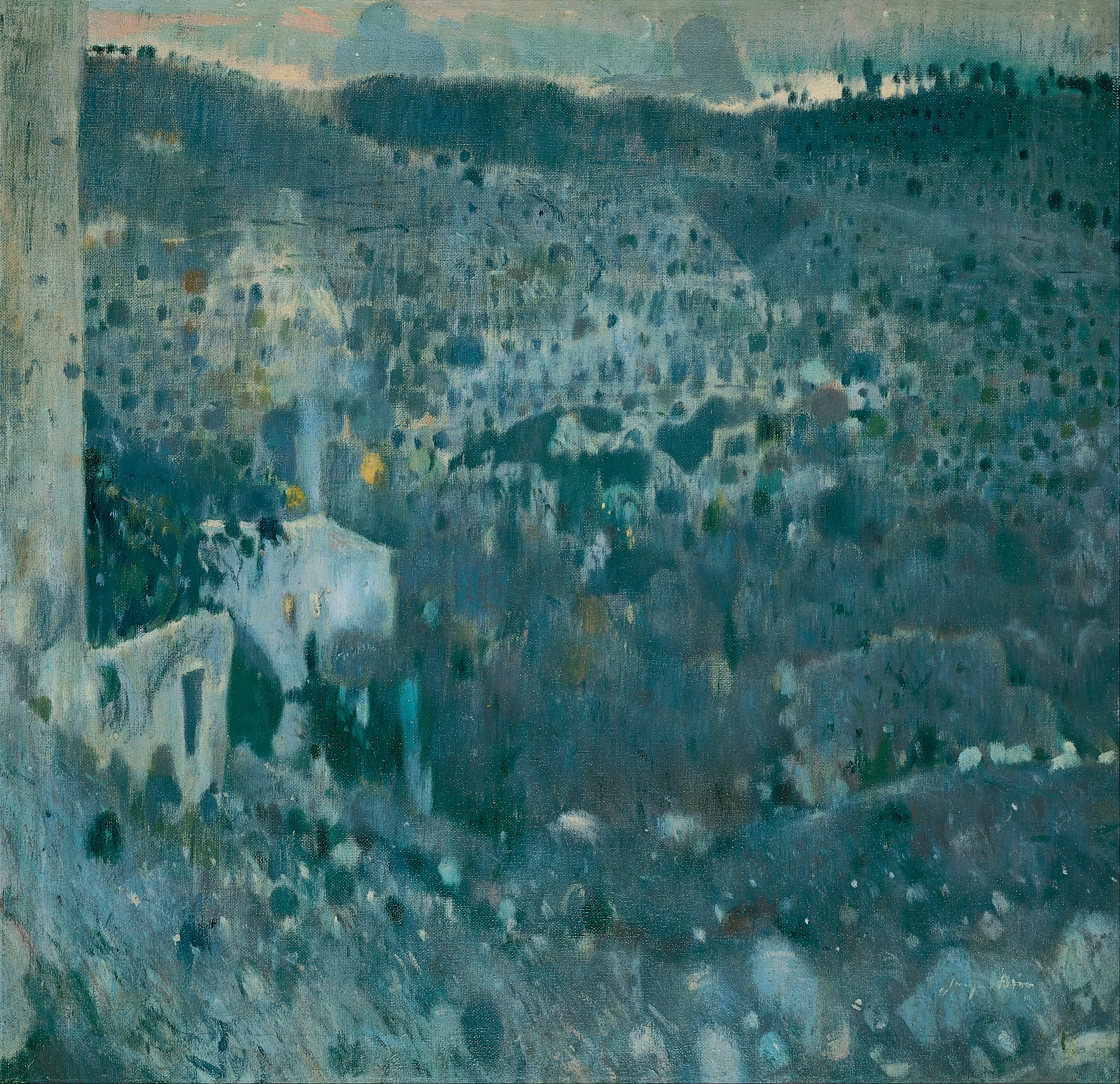
Spring (1910). 138 × 101 cm. Fundación Banco Santander.

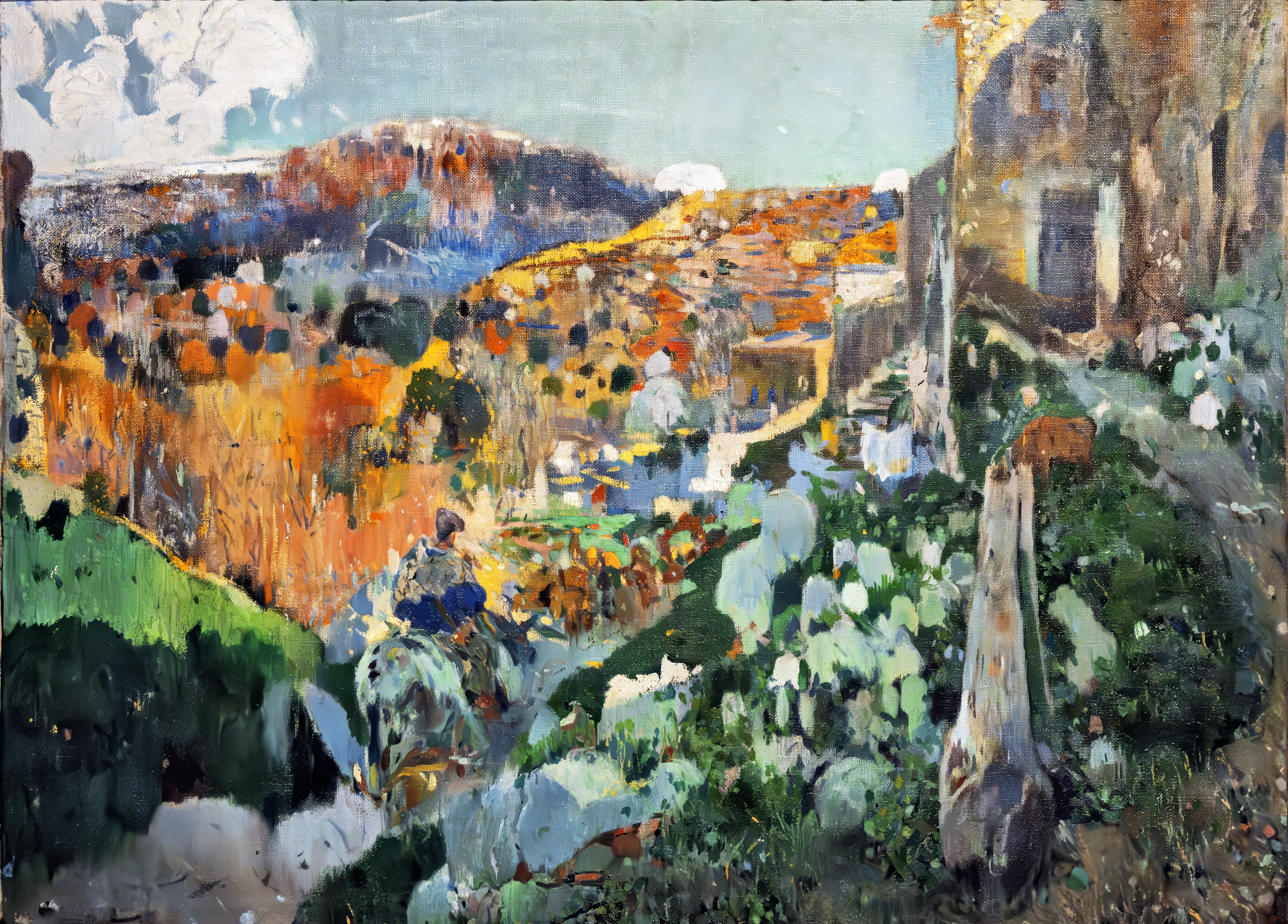
The Jewel (circa 1910). 125.5 × 168.5 cm. Museu Nacional d'Art de Catalunya.

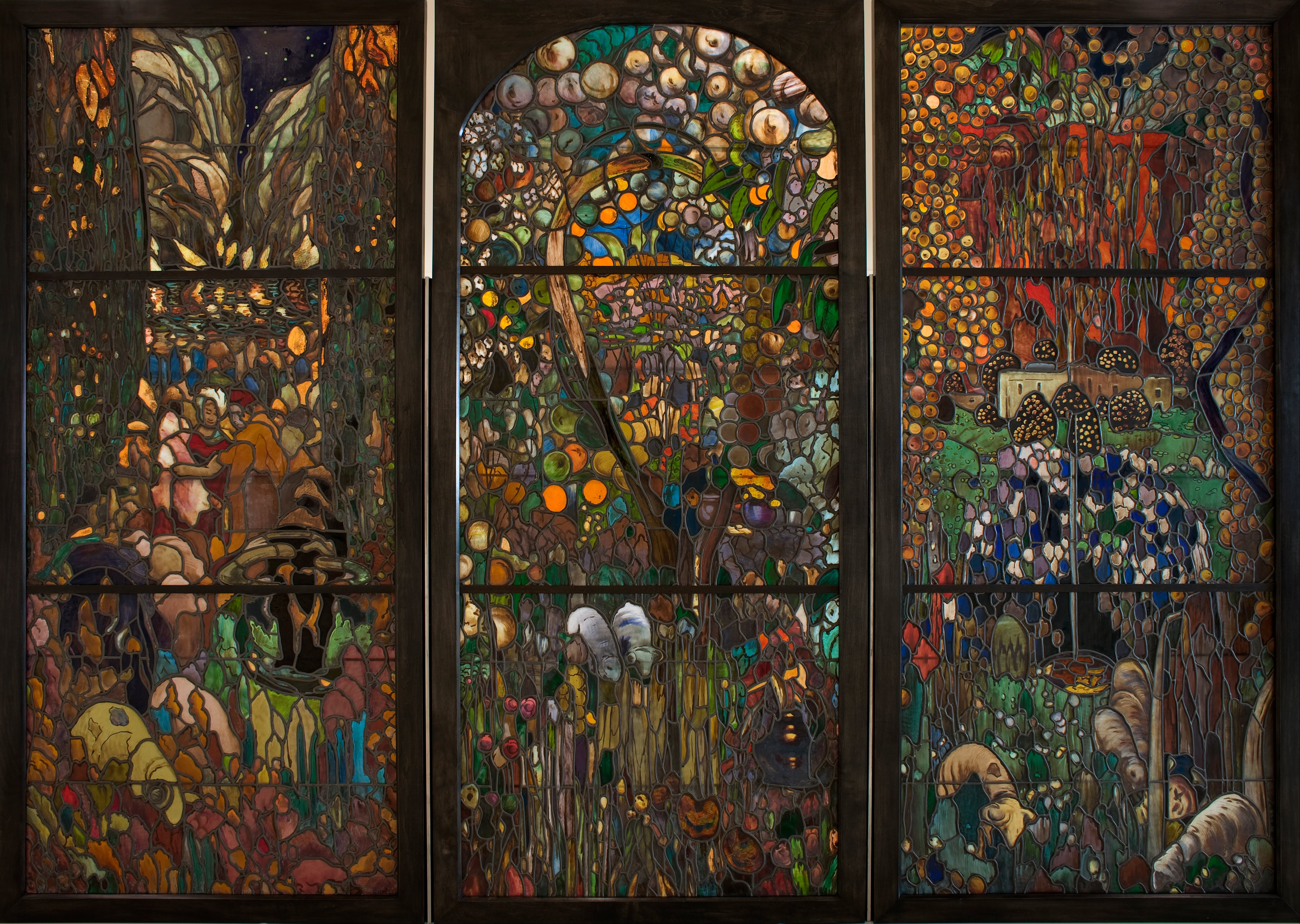
Stained glass triptych: El Gorg Blau (circa 1911). 222 × 294 mm. Museu Nacional d'Art de Catalunya.
