= Casa Calvet =

1900 building in Barcelona by Antoni Gaudí

Coordinates: 41°23′27″N 2°10′23″E

General information
- Architectural style: Modernisme
- Location: Barcelona, Spain
- Construction started: 1898
- Completed: 1900

Design and construction
- Architect: Antoni Gaudí

Spanish Cultural Heritage
- Type: Non-movable
- Criteria: Monument
- Designated: 24 July 1969
- Reference no.: RI-51-0003819

Casa Calvet (Catalan pronunciation: [ˈkazə kəlˈβɛt]) is a building, designed by Antoni Gaudí for a textile manufacturer which served as both a commercial property (in the basement and on the ground floor) and a residence. It is located at Carrer de Casp 48, Eixample district of Barcelona. It was built between 1898 and 1900.

Gaudí scholars agree that this building is the most conventional of his works, partly because it had to be squeezed in between older structures and partly because it was sited in one of the most elegant sections of Barcelona. Its symmetry, balance and orderly rhythm are unusual for Gaudí's works. However, the curves and double gable at the top, the projecting oriel at the entrance — almost baroque in its drama, and isolated witty details are modernista elements.

Bulging balconies alternate with smaller, shallower balconies. Mushrooms above the oriel at the center allude to the owner's favorite hobby.

Columns flanking the entrance are in the form of stacked bobbins — an allusion to the family business of textile manufacture. Lluís Permanyer claims that "the gallery at ground level is the façade's most outstanding feature, a daring combination of wrought iron and stone in which decorative historical elements such as a cypress, an olive tree, horns of plenty, and the Catalan coat of arms can be discerned".

Three sculpted heads at the top also allude to the owner: One is Sant Pere Màrtir Calvet i Carbonell (the owner's father) and two are patron saints of Vilassar, Andreu Calvet's home town.

Between 1899 and 1906, the Arts Building Annual Award (Concurso annual de edificios artísticos) awarded modernist pieces, like the Casa Calvet, the Casa Lleó Morera and the Casa Trinxet.

== See also ==
- List of Gaudí buildings

== See also ==
- List of Modernisme buildings in Barcelona
