= Pèl & Ploma =

Catalan artistic and literary journal (1899–1903)

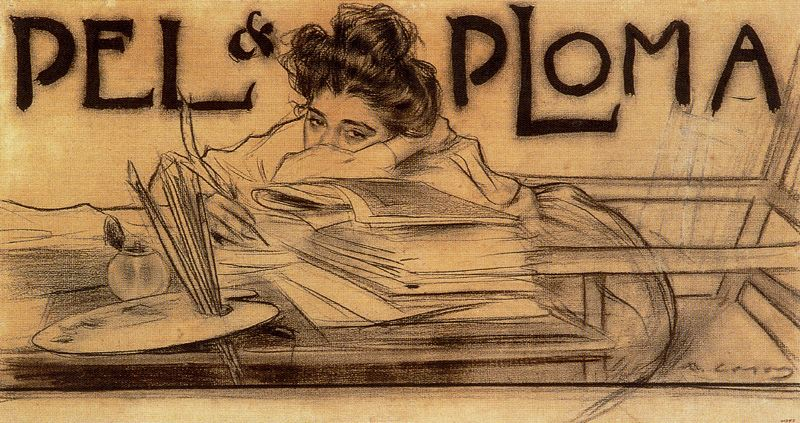
Cover of Pèl y Ploma, Issue 11, drawn by Ramón Casas in charcoal, pencil, and ink. 1899.

Pèl & Ploma was a Catalan artistic and literary journal that published 100 issues within four years between June 3, 1899 and December 1, 1903. Catalan artists Ramon Casas i Carbó and Miquel Utrillo ran the publication together, based out of the city of Barcelona. Casas financed the publication as well as provided the majority of covers, illustrations, and advertisements for each issue, while Utrillo directed the publication's literary components.

Pèl & Ploma is preceded by the journal Quatre Gats and succeeded by the journal Forma, which were both Catalan publications of the same genre. Together, these three journals provided a platform for Catalan Modernism, Pèl & Ploma being the longest-running and most popular of the three. Although it ceased circulation over a century ago, original issues and artworks of Pèl & Ploma are preserved today places such as the National Library of Catalonia and the National Art Museum of Catalonia.

In the first issue of Pèl & Ploma, Utrillo explained that the publication's title, which translates to “Hair & Feather” in English, had nothing to do with what it would publish; however, if one so wished, they could interpret “pèl”, or “hair” in Catalan, as “paintbrush” and “ploma”, or “feather” in Catalan, as a pen, thus referring to the magazine's display of art and prose.

== Origins of Pèl & Ploma and the Catalan press ==
The Catalan press originated during the 17th and 18th centuries and became widespread with publications such as Caxón de Sastre Cathalán, a magazine published around 1761. However, the modern magazine was not seen in circulation until the early 20th century. Around this time, Catalonia was experiencing the birth of a national conscience that was translated into two different genres of the modern Catalan magazine: literary and popular.

Literary magazines greatly contributed to the artistic and literary movements of the early 20th century, despite their struggles to attract a steady readership. In Catalonia, they promoted and documented what was occurring at the time in the worlds of Catalan art and literature. Among the first modern magazines of Catalonia were the three literature and art reviews directed by Ramon Casas and Miquel Utrillo: Quatre Gats, Pèl & Ploma, and Forma.

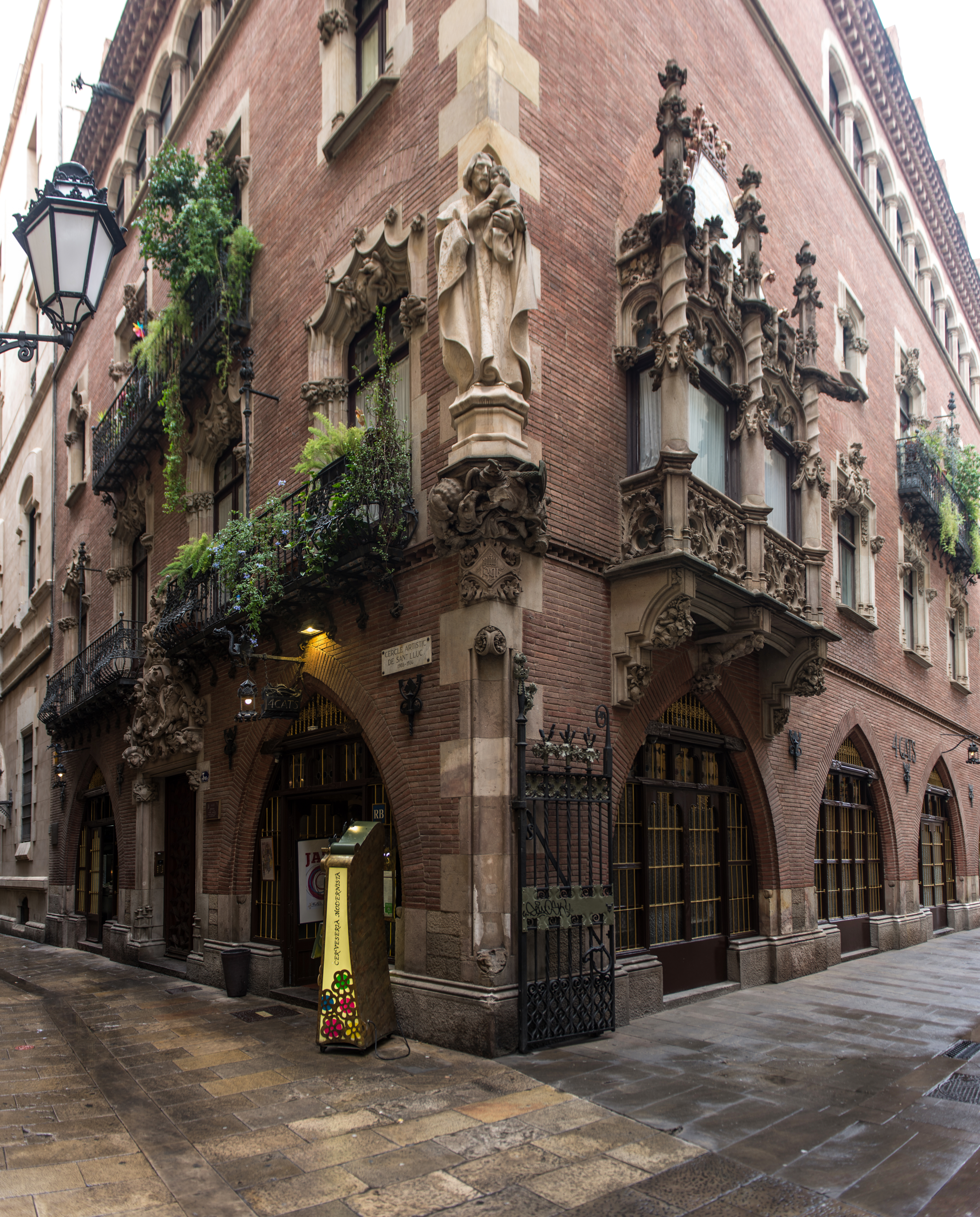
The outside of Els Quatre Gats café in Barcelona. This café served as a cultural hub for the artists and intellectuals of Catalan modernism, including Pèl & Ploma creators Ramón Casas and Miquel Utrillo.

Quatre Gats, the first of the three publications headed by the pair of artists, began circulation in 1899. The title Quatre Gats comes from the famous Els Quatre Gats café, which was a cultural hub at the time for modernist artists in Barcelona that the men frequented until it closed in 1903. Like the café, the magazine was a space for the growth and exploration of Catalan modernism. The team released an issue every week from February through May of that year, releasing its last issue on May 25.

Production of Pèl & Ploma immediately followed the cease of Quatre Gats, its first issue appearing on June 3, 1899—a week after the last of its predecessor. Its four years of publication can be divided into three distinct periods: its first year, second year, and final two years. At first, the magazine was released weekly, but resigned to a monthly distribution in its later years. Pèl & Ploma continued on with the role of Quatre Gats within the Catalan modernist movement until its last issue on December 1, 1903.

Forma was the third and final publication of this group of literary magazines. It carried out the same role as its two predecessors from its start in 1904 until its discontinuation in 1908.

Casas and Utrillo also found inspiration for this particular series of publications in Gil Blas and other culturally important Parisian publications of the time. Both men spent many years in Paris before they began publishing their own reviews.

== Format and content ==
The format of Pèl & Ploma followed that of Quatre Gats, both having been created by relatively the same staff. This format was at first a folio consisting of four pages; a color cover on the first, literary texts and drawings in the remaining pages, and advertisements included on the last page. This basic format did, however, change most drastically during the publication's third year.

During its first year, Casas took advantage of his authority over the publication and used it as a platform for his own work. Nearly all of the covers, illustrations, and advertisements in each issue were works of his own. Likewise, Utrillo wrote most of the prose featured in these issues, his texts sometimes serious but more often than not humorous. Eventually, the men relinquished page space to other artists and writers, yet still contributed a great deal themselves to each issue. During its second year, the publication began to feature more written contributions and include more illustrations. The most drastic change occurred its third year and remained in its fourth, when it was only released on a monthly basis yet with additional pages and contributions from artists outside of Catalonia.

The magazine's covers were of great importance to not only its own success but also significantly to the success of Casas. The artist designed each cover, which he always created in color as to attract the eye of the public and gain readership. This platform brought him a great deal of recognition for his artwork. He used a mixture of mediums, such as pencil, charcoal, and ink, to create these covers. Some of the original drawings are on display in the National Art Museum of Catalonia. Perhaps the most recognizable of these images is the cover from issue 11, published 12 August 1899. The drawing features a woman slouched on a desk behind a stack of papers, a feather quill in hand and the magazine's title etched above her.

Another significant piece of content published by the magazine was Utrillo's profile of Catalan painter Pablo Picasso, whose work was gaining great recognition at the time. This piece was the first extensive article to cover the life and work of the famous artist, who was part of the Els Quatre Gats and Catalan modernist community.

== Notable contributors ==
- Ramón Casas
- Lambert Escaler
- Joaquín Mir
- Isidre Nonell
- Pablo Picasso
- Auguste Rodin
- Santiago Rusiñol
- Miquel Utrillo
- Luïsa a Vidal

== General themes and legacy ==
In general, the articles and artwork published in Pèl & Ploma brought awareness to international artistic trends. Barcelona, the city the publication was based out of, experienced a new wave of modernity via the content that Pèl & Ploma and similar reviews were published.

Pèl & Ploma, its predecessor Quatre Gats, and its successor Forma were distinct from other magazines of the moment because they were largely artistic journals instead of literary ones. Their focus on art allowed them to present a different conversation to the public, in which they rejected the existing, ornate culture of Art Nouveau and refused to follow any common trends with its content.

Much of the work published in Pèl & Ploma denounced the art of the past and academic art, which had once been of great prestige but now appeared too artificial. The publication's rejection of past artistic moments and trends emphasized its overall goal to promote and contribute to a fresh and innovative culture in Catalonia and the art world in general.

Pèl & Ploma documented and upheld the legacy of the famed Els Quatre Gats café. The café closed its doors in 1903 and didn't reopen until 1989, now more of a historic site than a cultural hub. The publication created a lasting record of the iconic culture and important ideas that instigated Catalan Modernism and resulted in a great portion of Catalonia's modern culture.
