= Joaquin Mir Trinxet =

Spanish artist (1873–1940)

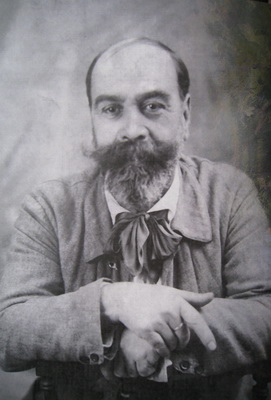
- Joaquin Mir Trinxet (1915)
- Born: 6 January 1873; Barcelona, Spain
- Died: 8 April 1940 (aged 67)
- Known for: Painting, drawing
- Movement: Modernisme

Joaquin Mir Trinxet (Note: Also quoted as «Joaquin Mir y Trinxet» or «Joaquim Mir i Trinxet».) (Barcelona 6 January 1873 – 8 April 1940) was a Spanish artist known for his use of color in his paintings. He lived through a turbulent time in the history of his native Barcelona. His paintings helped to define the Catalan art movement known as modernisme.

== Barcelona and Paris ==
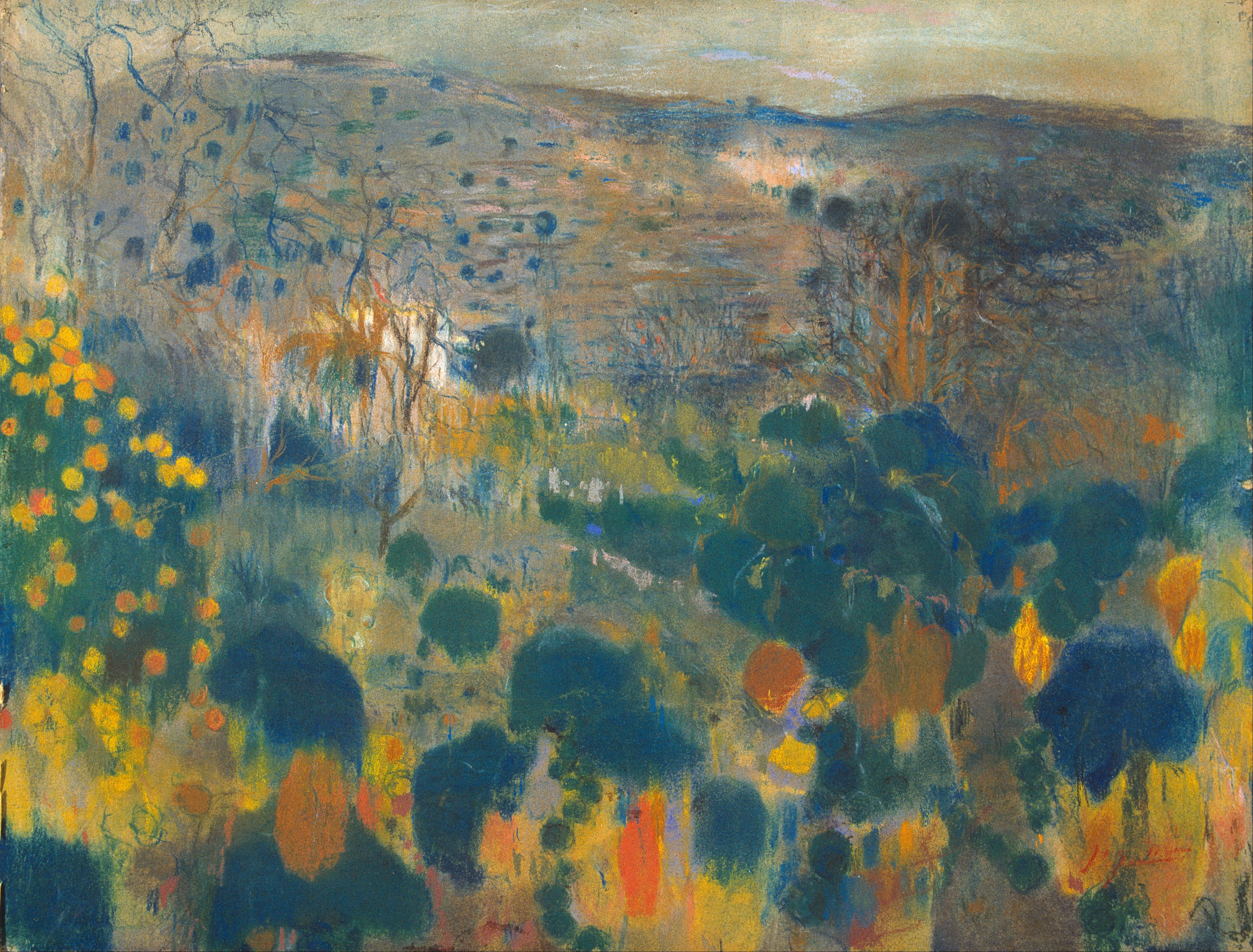
Landscape (around 1900-03). 496 × 646 mm. Museu Nacional d'Art de Catalunya.

Mir Trinxet was born in Barcelona to a well-off Catalan family. His father was representative of foreign firms, some of them from Nuremberg. Mir studied at the Llotja before joining the Colla del Safrà group with Canals, Nonell, and Pichot. Thanks to an agreement with his uncle Avelino Trinxet Casas, he was able to work as a painter and in 1899 Mir went to Mallorca with Santiago Rusiñol, where he met the mystic Belgian painter William Degouve de Nuncques, whose work would influence his own. Working in isolated circumstances in Mallorca, Mir painted odd landscapes in which forms and chromatic colors merged. In his first exhibition in Barcelona in 1901, the critical reviews were positive but the public found his paintings difficult to comprehend. He started in Mallorca a solitary artistic process, full of colors without forms, which finished when he suffered an accident in 1905.

In 1913 he returned to more realistic positions, receiving recognition for his work. From this period, his paintings tended to become more mystic, more abstract, and highly colored evocations of nature rather than topographical scenes.

Among the artists he met in this period of his life, and who influenced him, were Laureà Barrau, Santiago Rusiñol, Eugène Carrière, Pierre Puvis de Chavannes, and Ignacio Zuloaga.

He was one of the rare Spanish painters of the period who did not continue his artistic education in Paris. But he visited Ramon Casas i Carbó (Casas) and Rusiñol, who lived together at the Moulin de la Galette in Montmartre, regularly, along with painter and art critic Miquel Utrillo and the sketch artist Ramon Canudas. Rusiñol chronicled these times in a series of articles "Desde el Molino" ("From the Mill") for La Vanguardia.

He had not the same influence from the French Impressionists as Casas. The style that would become known as modernisme had not yet fully come together, but the key people were beginning to know one another, and successful Catalan artists were increasingly coming to identify themselves with Barcelona as much as with Paris.

Meanwhile, the Bohemian circle that included Casas and Rusiñol began with greater frequency to organize exhibitions of their own in Barcelona and Sitges. With this increasing activity in Catalonia, he settled more in or around Barcelona.

Mir Trinxet contributed several murals to Casa Trinxet after his trip to Majorca with Santiago Rusiñol, where he met the mystic Belgian painter William Degouve de Nuncques in 1899, and before his move to Reus. He started his work in the house in 1903.

The personal papers of Joaquim Mir are preserved in the Biblioteca de Catalunya.

== Mir Trinxet Private Art Manifiesto ==
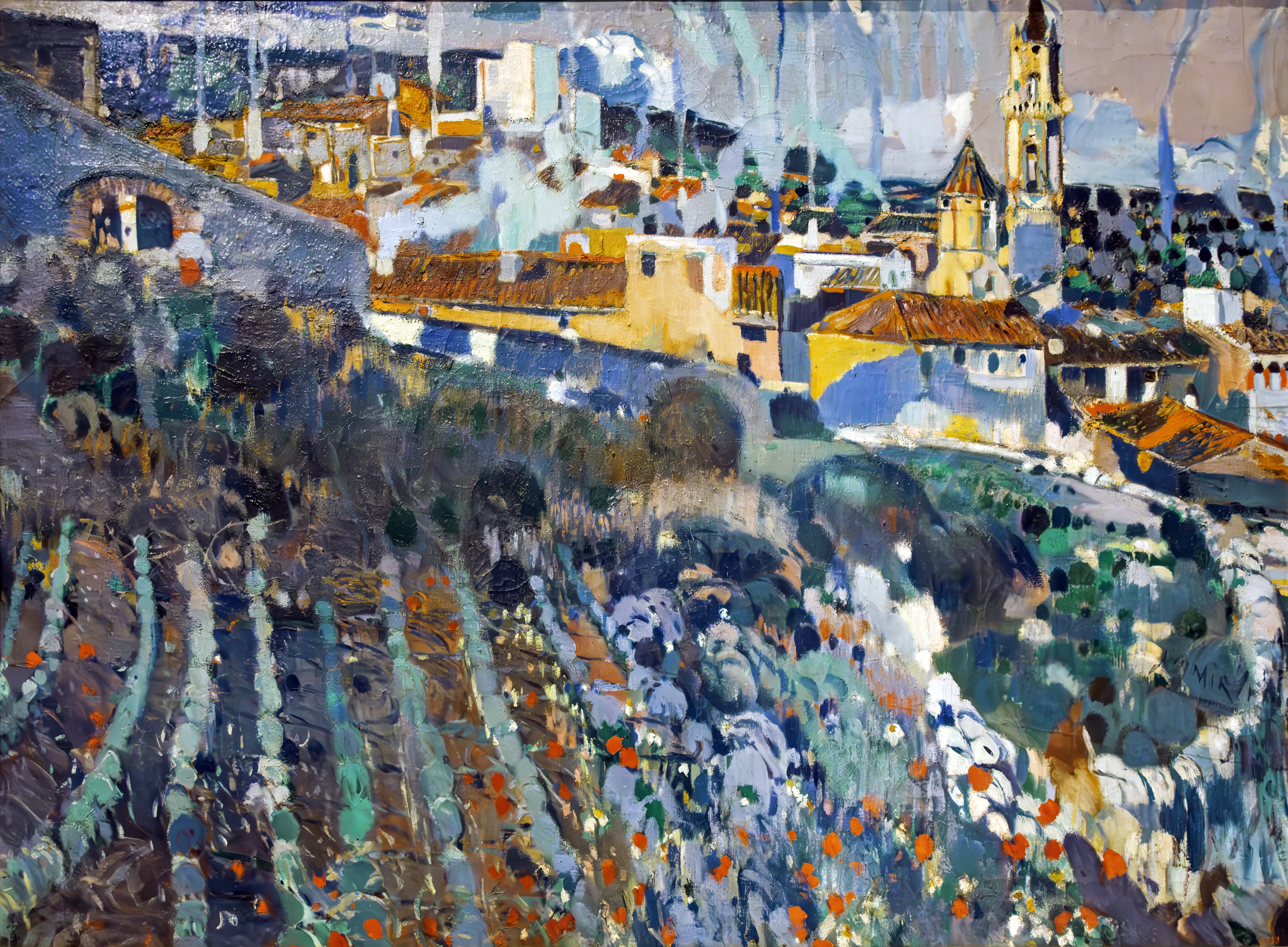
Terraced Village (circa 1909). 121 × 164 cm. Museu Nacional d'Art de Catalunya.

Mir Trinxet summed up his private art manifesto in 1928: "All I want is for my works to lighten the heart and flood the eyes and the soul with light."

Colour and light meant everything to Mir, and he used them to build a personal idiom in which he created a surprisingly modern oeuvre, beyond the art movements like Impressionism or Symbolism with which critics have often sought to associate him. Although his artistic development varied between realism and abstraction, two features crop up throughout his entire output: the urge to establish a new vision of nature and an unremitting search for beauty marked by genuine creative tension.

Mir Trinxet painted landscapes in Tarragona and Majorca (perhaps his best-known works, and certainly the ones that contributed most to create the myth of the artist that merged with nature and lost himself in a delirium of light and colour). In his late works created in Vilanova i la Geltrú, Mir Trinxet intensified the realist side of his work. He also produced works during his campaigns in places like Andorra, Montserrat, Miravet and Gualba.

== Casa Trinxet ==
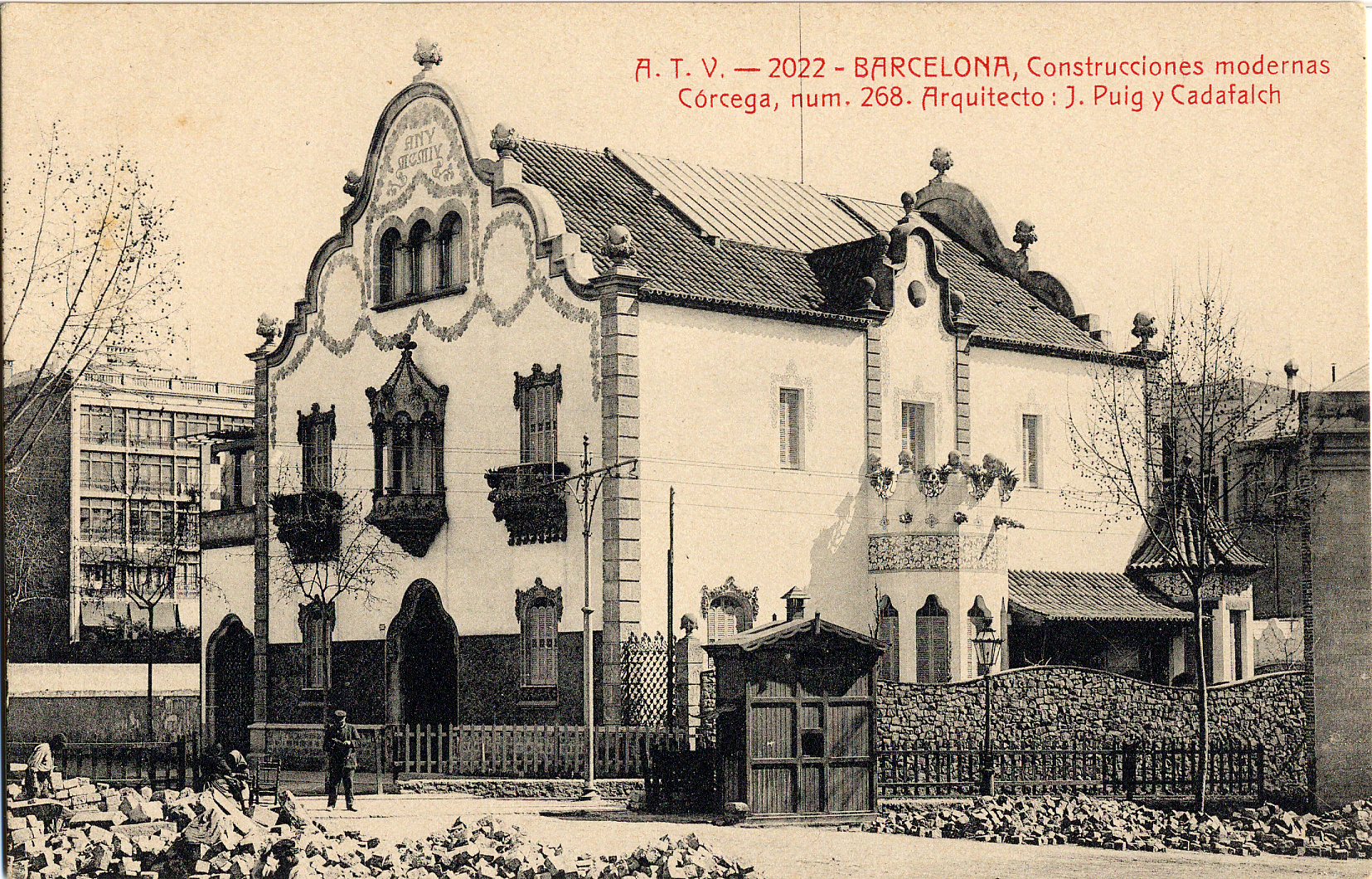
Casa Trinxet

Special consideration has the major works for the Casa Trinxet in Barcelona, in which Mir Trinxet captured his total conception of the landscape.

Casa Trinxet was a building designed by Catalan Modernist architect Josep Puig i Cadafalch and built during the years 1902–1904, in the Eixample district of Barcelona. Casa Trinxet was "one of the jewels of Barcelona Modernism" and one of the buildings of Barcelona's Illa de la Discòrdia ("Block of Discord"), because of the competing attitudes of Domènech i Montaner, Puig i Cadafalch and Antoni Gaudí.

The building was commissioned by Mir Trinxet's uncle Avelino Trinxet Casas, of the textile industry family Trinxet, from Barcelona. Avelino Trinxet was also the owner of the Trinxet factory built in 1907 by Joan Alsina i Arús in Can Trinxet, Hospitalet, near Barcelona, in a modernist fashion.

The vidres were made in picture-style appearance, like the commissioned by Trinxet from the Rigalt, Granell y Cía. firm in 1910-1912, following instructions from Joaquín Mir Trinxet.

The Casa Trinxet was demolished in 1968 despite attempts by artists and intellectuals to save it for conversion into a museum of Modernism, in the period of Porcioles council, for the builders Nuñez i Navarro.

Lastly movements were late to save Casa Trinxet.

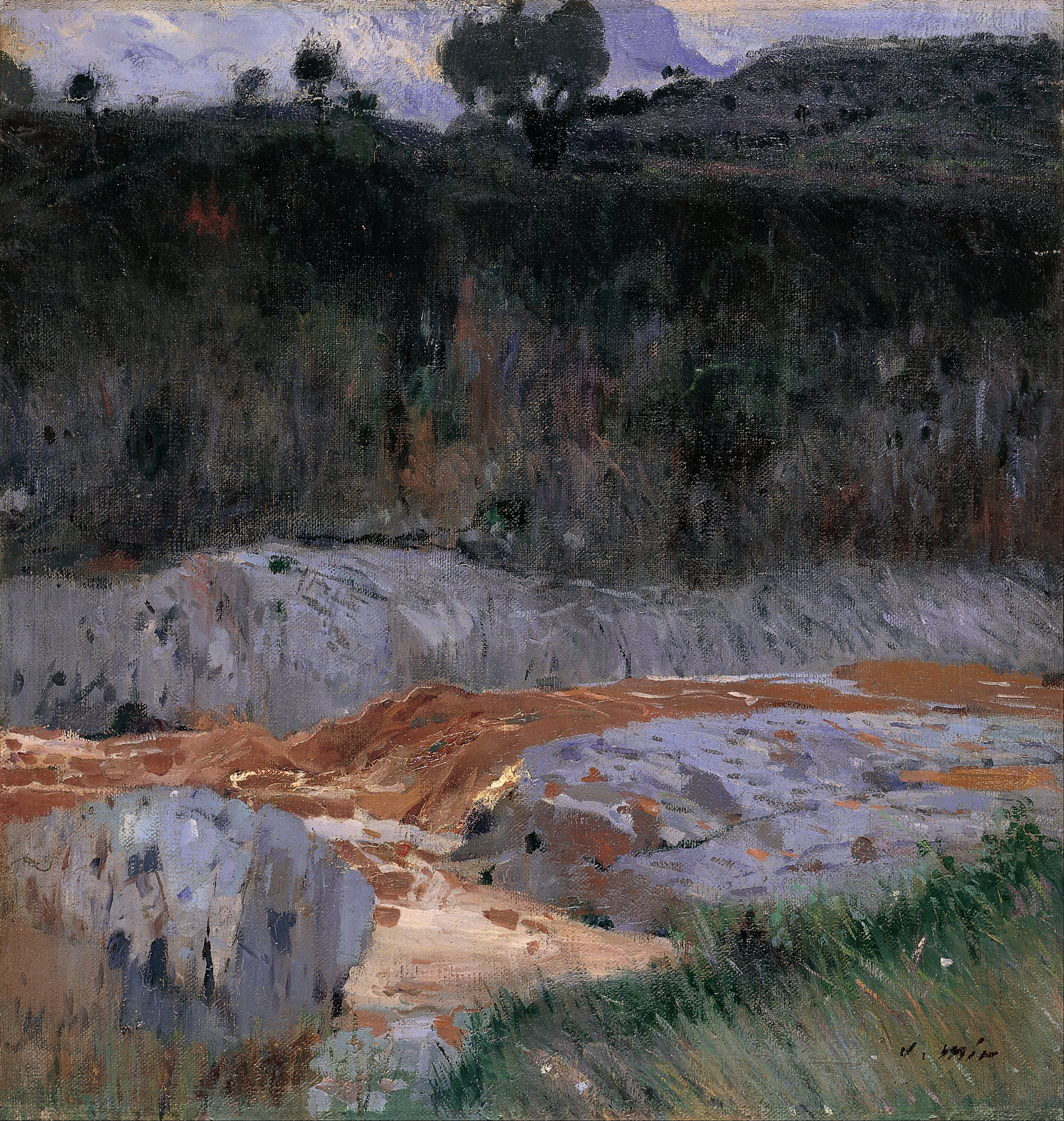
Red Earth (1921). 107 × 101 cm. Fundación Banco Santander.

== Impressionist, landscape artist ==
It is true that the range of colours in his palette coincided with the one the Impressionists used; he also coincided with them in excluding the colour black, using a host of combinations to paint shadow. But Mir used these technical resources to create a world of his own, a new landscape. Rather than assimilate and reproduce the theories predominating at the time, his work developed more out of an inner need brought into being by his idiosyncratic way of looking at nature and light.

Essentially, Mir was a landscape artist who took the landscape into a new, as yet unknown dimension. To do so, he played with and revamped a broad range of complementary colours. This is the key to the power of colour in Mir's painting and the tool that enabled him to structure his works on colour rather than form, imbuing his landscapes with genuine soul. His style was followed by Salvador Masana.

== Mir Trinxet as a film director ==
Titled Mir's Moving Eye, the audiovisual work presents his activities as an amateur film director. The films, shot between 1930 and 1936 as Mir's life drew to a close, are currently held in the artist's son's collection. In addition to these early film explorations, viewers can see what life was like in the Mir family and compare real scenes with the results in his works.

== Catalan modernism ==
In January 2011, the Fondation de l'Hermitage in Lausanne organized a major exhibition devoted to Spanish art at the dawn of the 20th century. Focusing on painters of “The Generation of 1898” who emerged from the severe upheavals endured by Spain throughout the 19th century, the exhibition highlights how these artists evolved. Oscillating between respect for Hispanic traditions and modernity, their works were part of the contemporary surge to broaden horizons that arose among the Spanish avant-garde. The Fondation de l'Hermitage selected several works of Joaquin Mir Trinxet.

According to the Fondation: "The painters who pushed and cajoled Spain into the modern era in art are hardly familiar names outside Spain: Bereute, Santiago Rusiñol, Casas, Anglada, Pinazo, Juaquin Mir Trinxet, Regoyos, and many others, are all but forgotten figures outside of Spain who nevertheless decidedly contributed to the character of Spanish painting at the dawn of the 20th century".

== Els Quatre Gats ==
The emerging modernista art world gained a center with the opening of Els Quatre Gats, a bar modeled on Le Chat Noir in Paris. Casas largely financed this bar on the ground floor of Casa Martí, a building by Architect Josep Puig i Cadafalch, the designer of Casa Trinxet, in Montsió Street near the center of Barcelona; it opened in June 1897 and lasted for six years (and was later reconstructed in 1978). The bar hosted tertulias and revolving art exhibits, including one of the first one-man shows by Pablo Picasso.

Like Le Chat Noir, Els Quatre Gats attempted its own literary and artistic magazine. That was short-lived, but was soon followed by Pèl & Ploma, which would slightly outlast the bar itself, and Forma (1904–1908). Pèl & Ploma sponsored several prominent art exhibitions.

It is not clear if Mir Trinxet was a frequent or infrequent habitué of El Quatre Gats, where he met many of the modernist painters.

Mir Trinxet, sometimes, like Casas, adopted the Art Nouveau style that would come to define modernisme.

== Other selected works ==
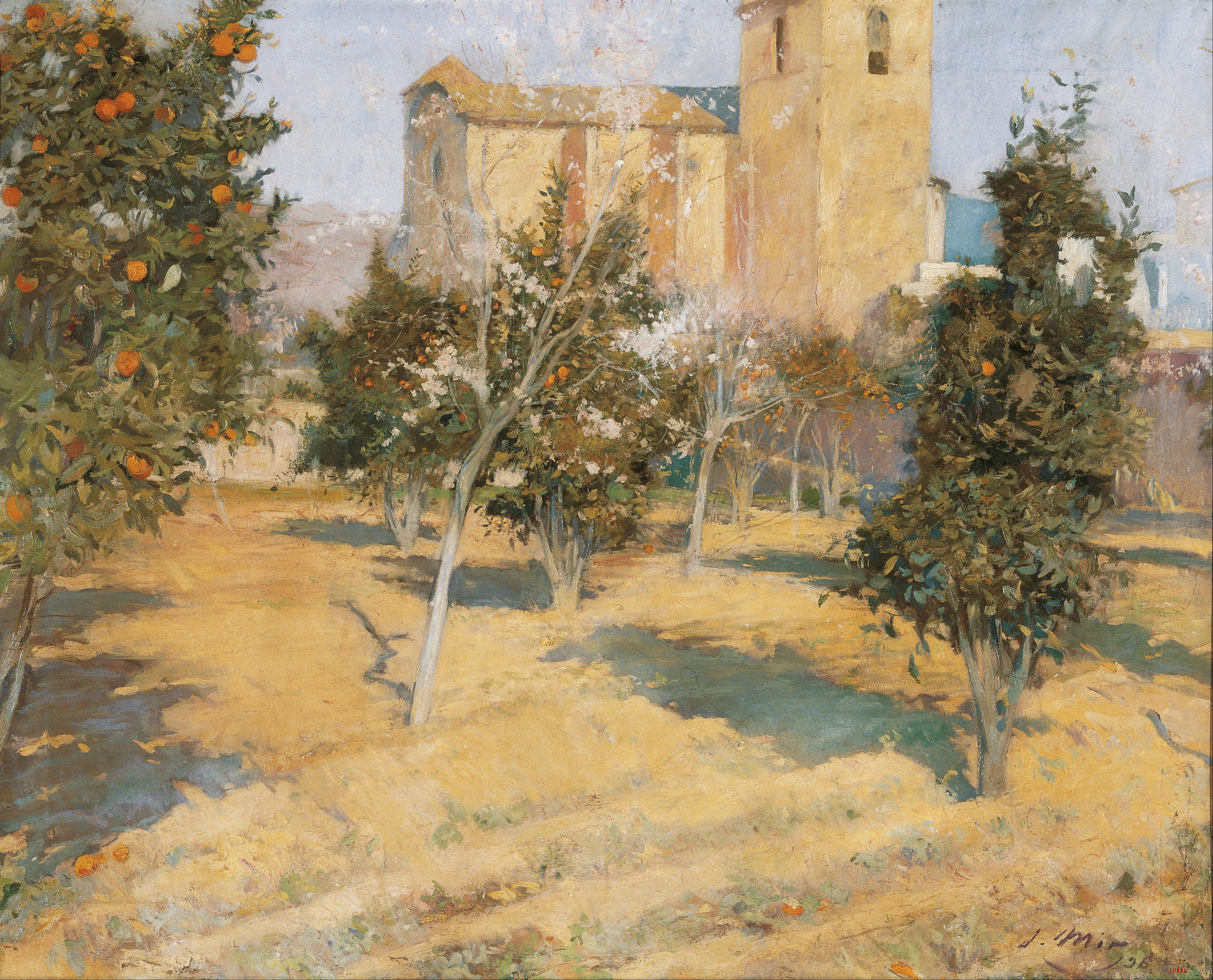
The Rector's Orchard (1896). 100.5 × 126 cm. Museu Nacional d'Art de Catalunya.

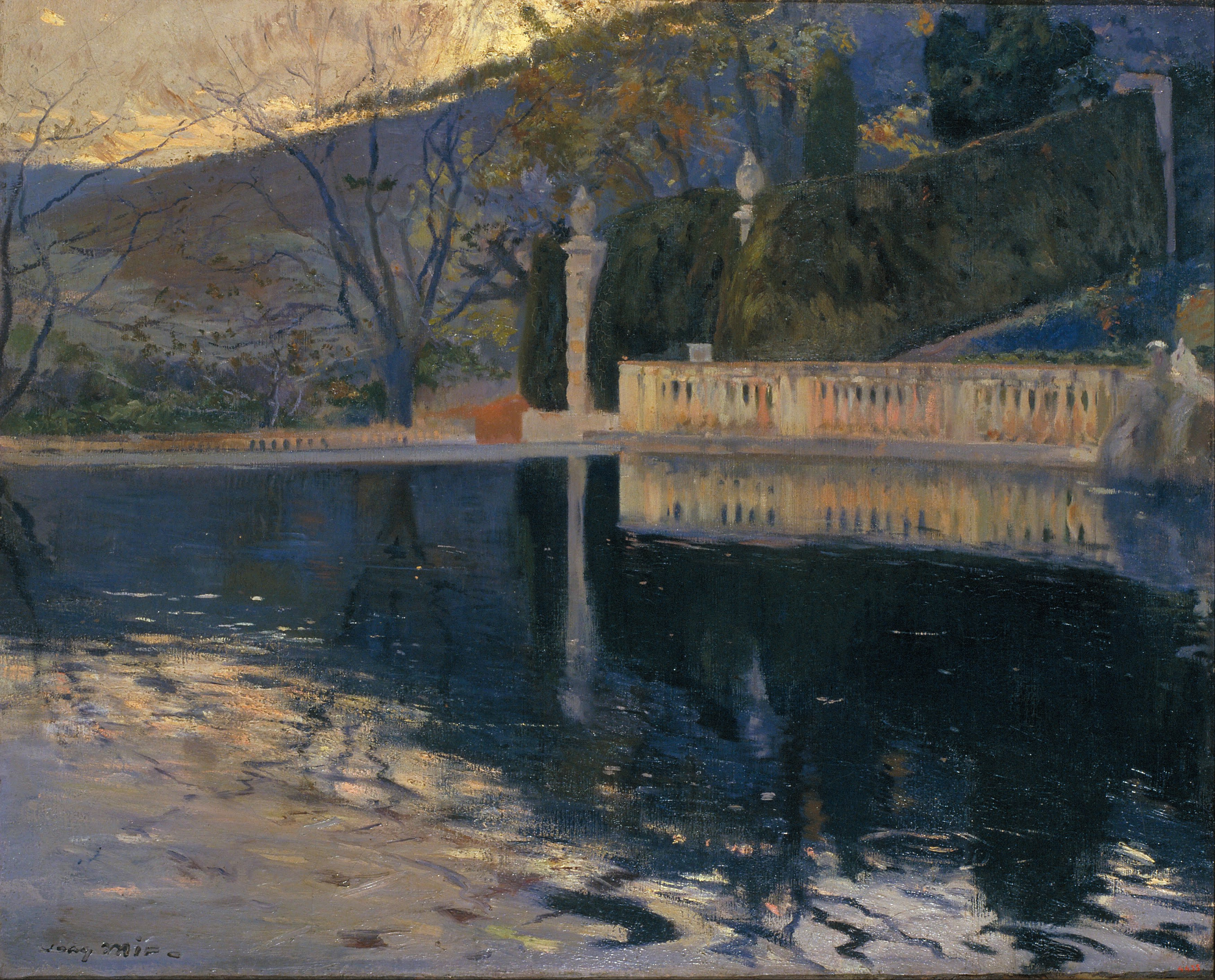
The Labyrinth (Horta, Barcelona) (circa 1898). 115.5 × 141.5 cm. Museu Nacional d'Art de Catalunya.

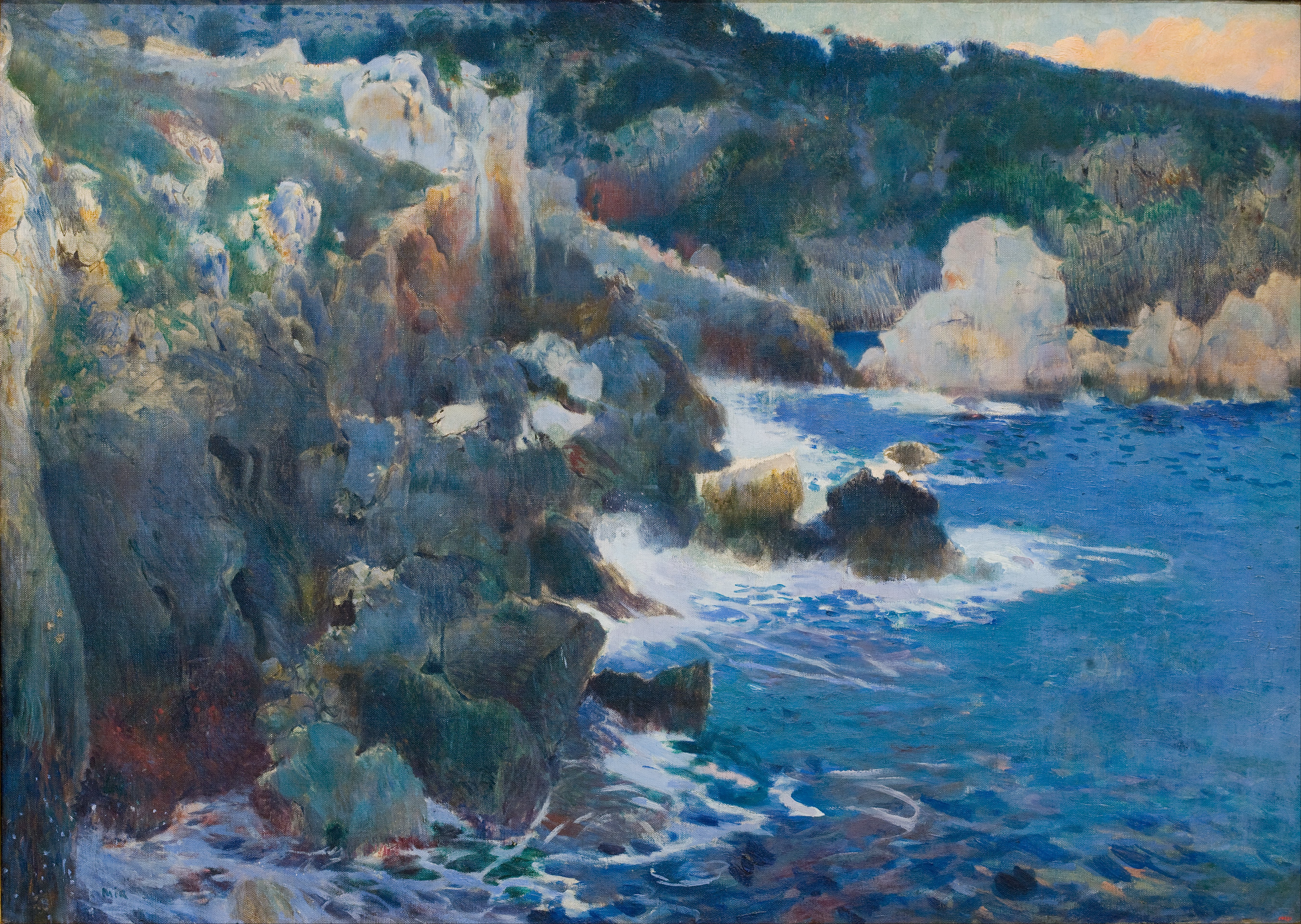
Cala Encantada (Majorca) (circa 1901). 86.5 × 121 cm. Museu Nacional d'Art de Catalunya.

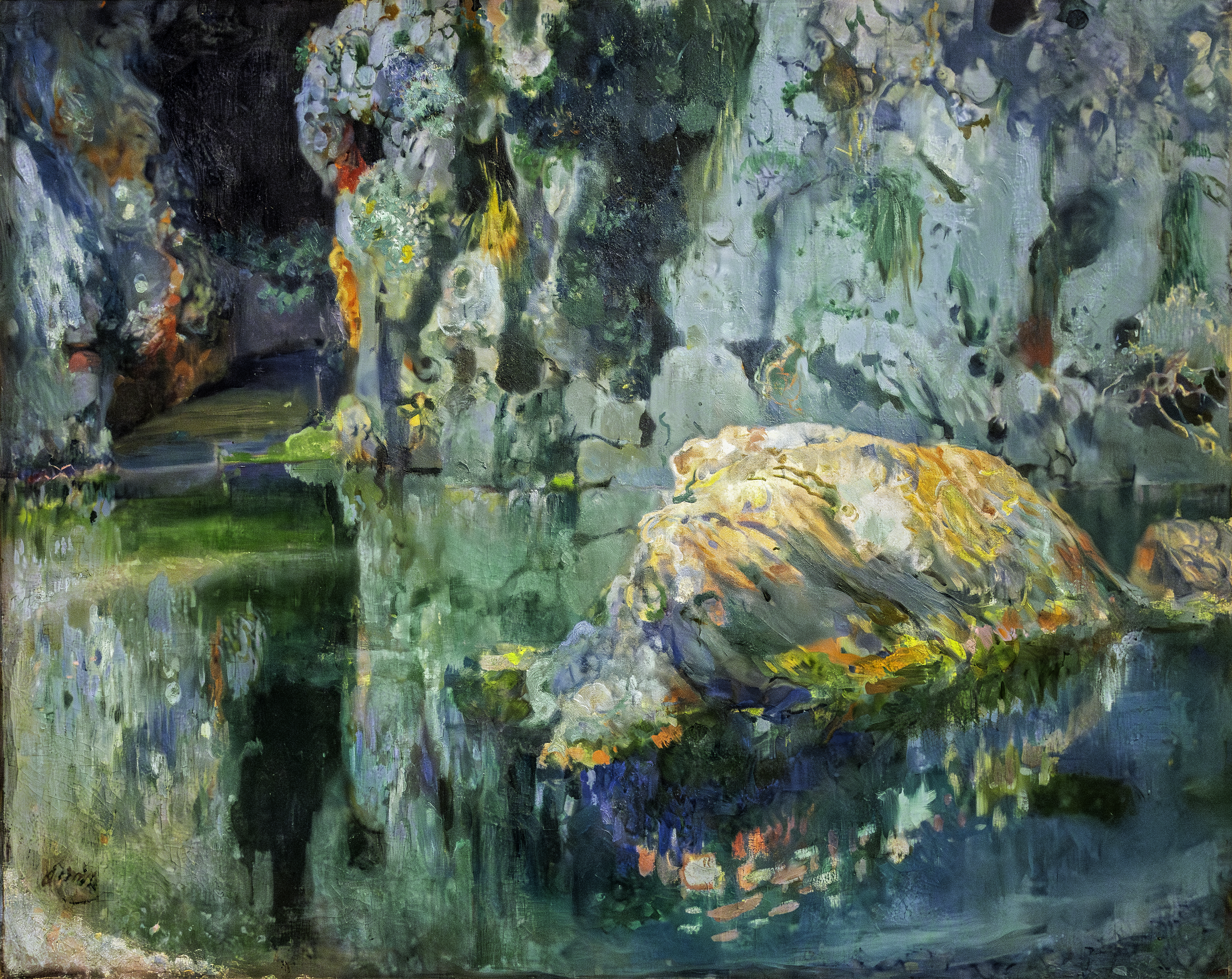
The Rock in the Pond (circa 1903). 102 × 128 cm. Museu Nacional d'Art de Catalunya.

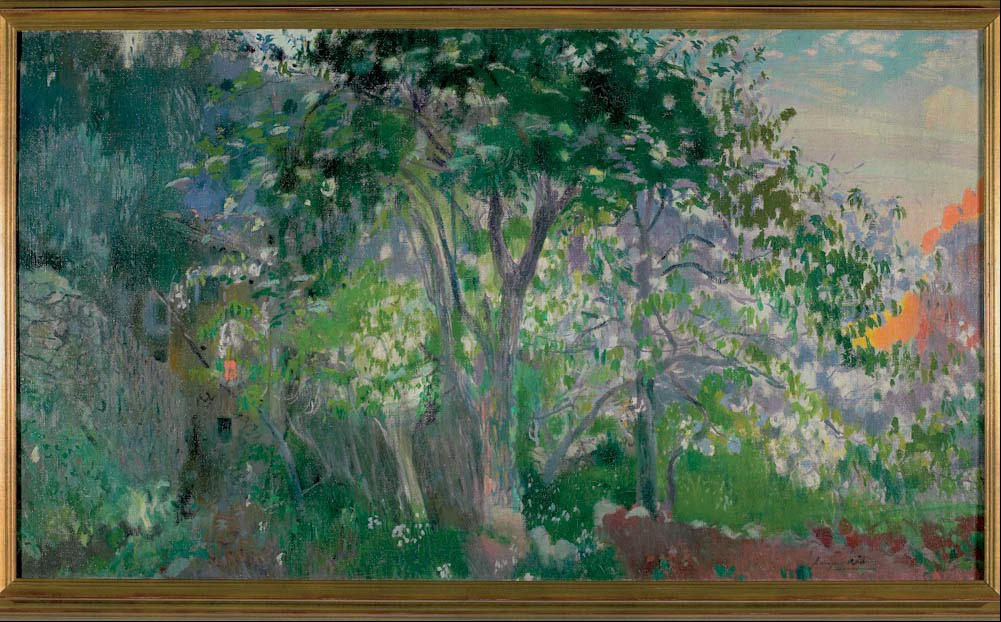
The Big Tree, Sa Calobra (1903). 98 × 174 cm. Fundación Banco Santander.

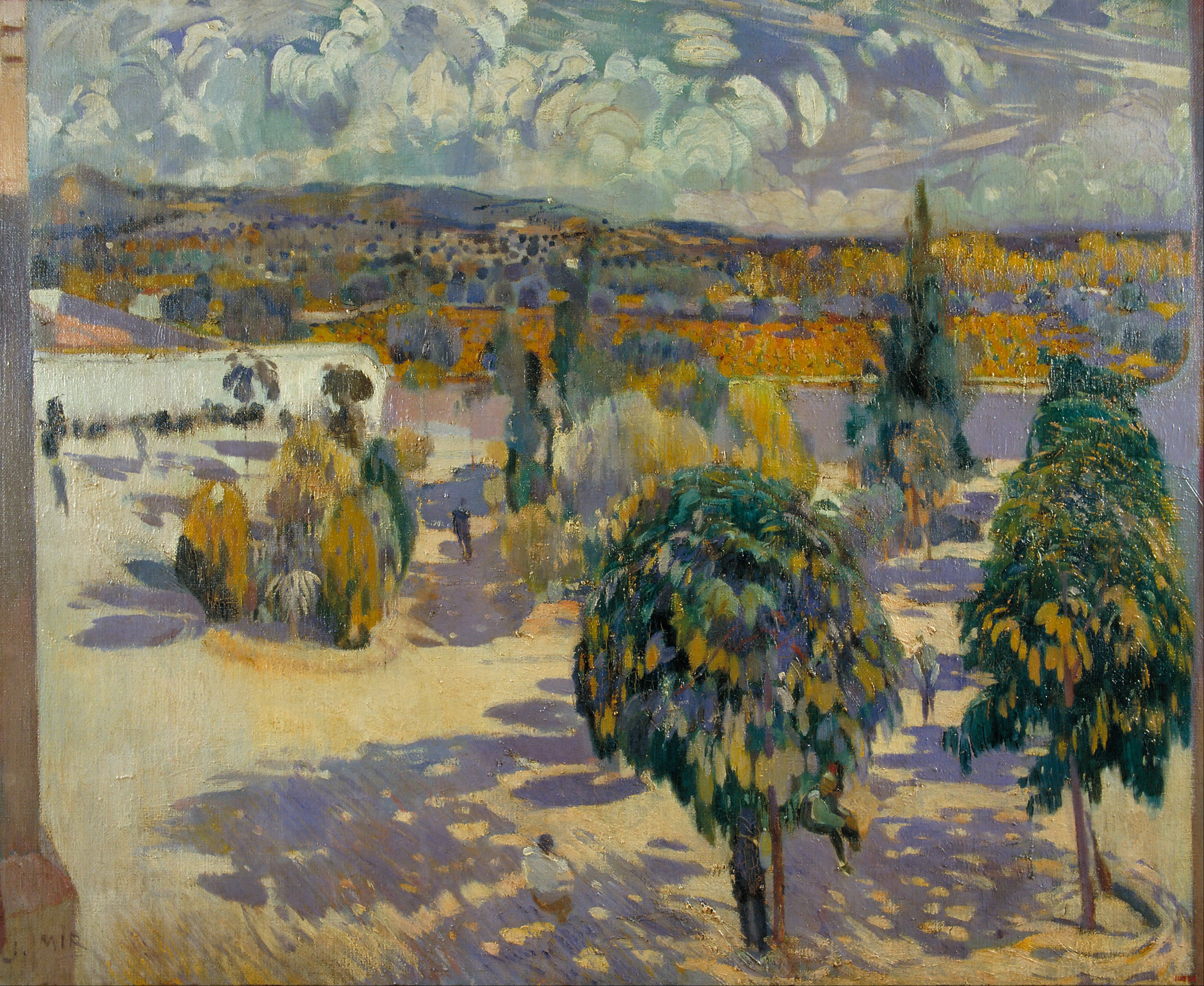
Thundery Sky (circa 1907). 1225 × 1514 mm. Museu Nacional d'Art de Catalunya.

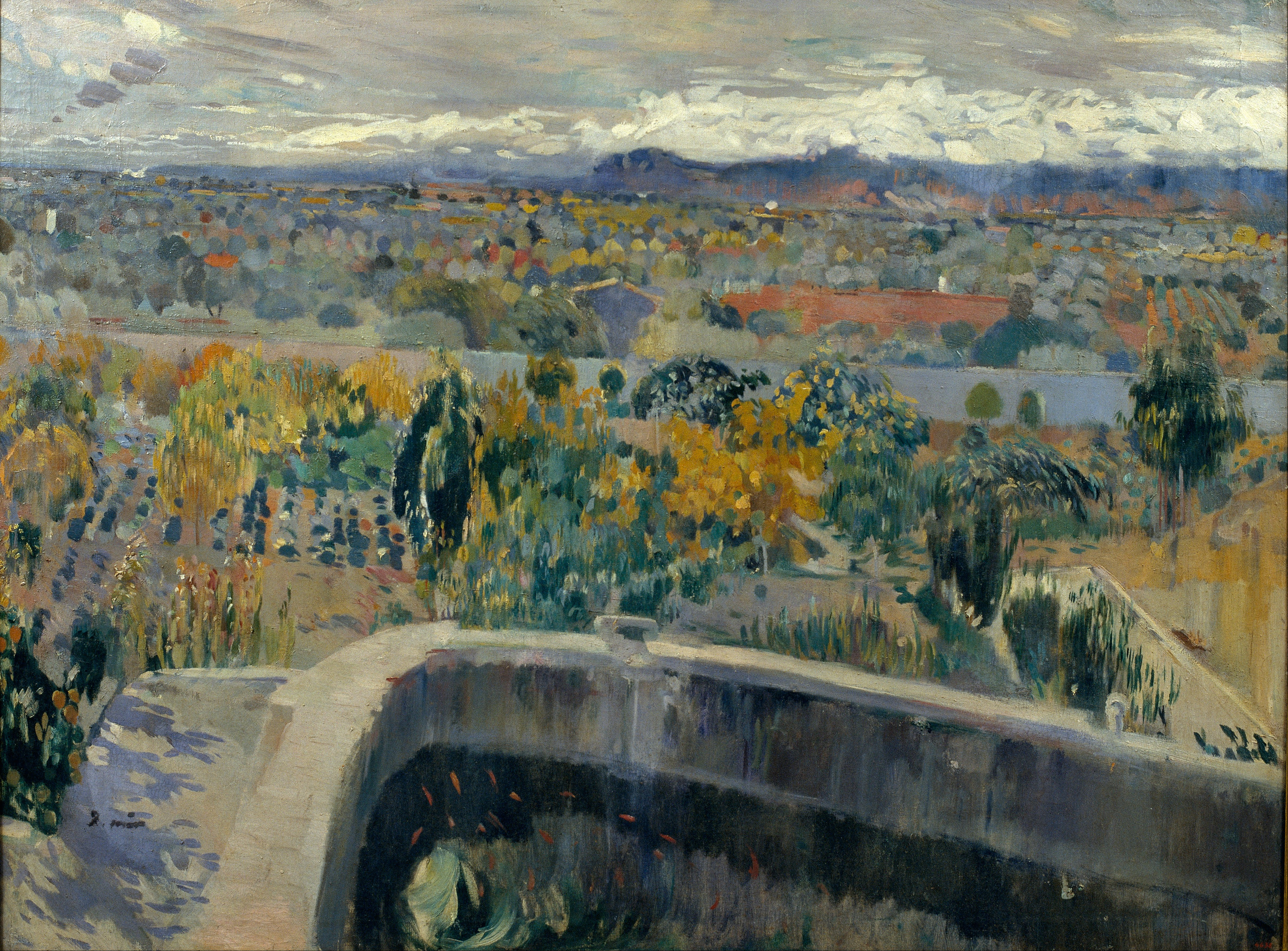
The New Pond (around 1907-1913). 123.5 × 165.5 cm. Museu Nacional d'Art de Catalunya.

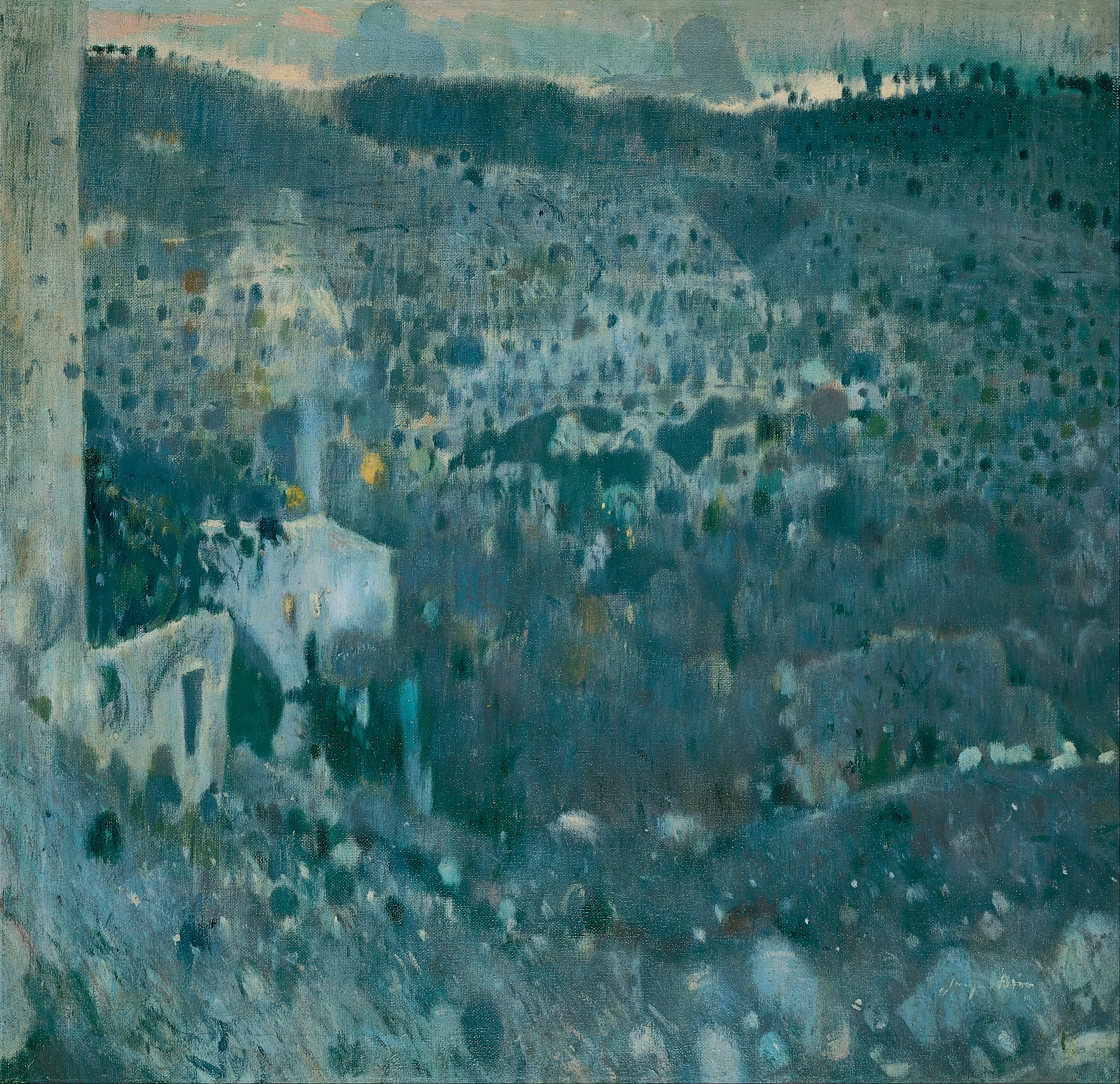
Spring (1910). 138 × 101 cm. Fundación Banco Santander.

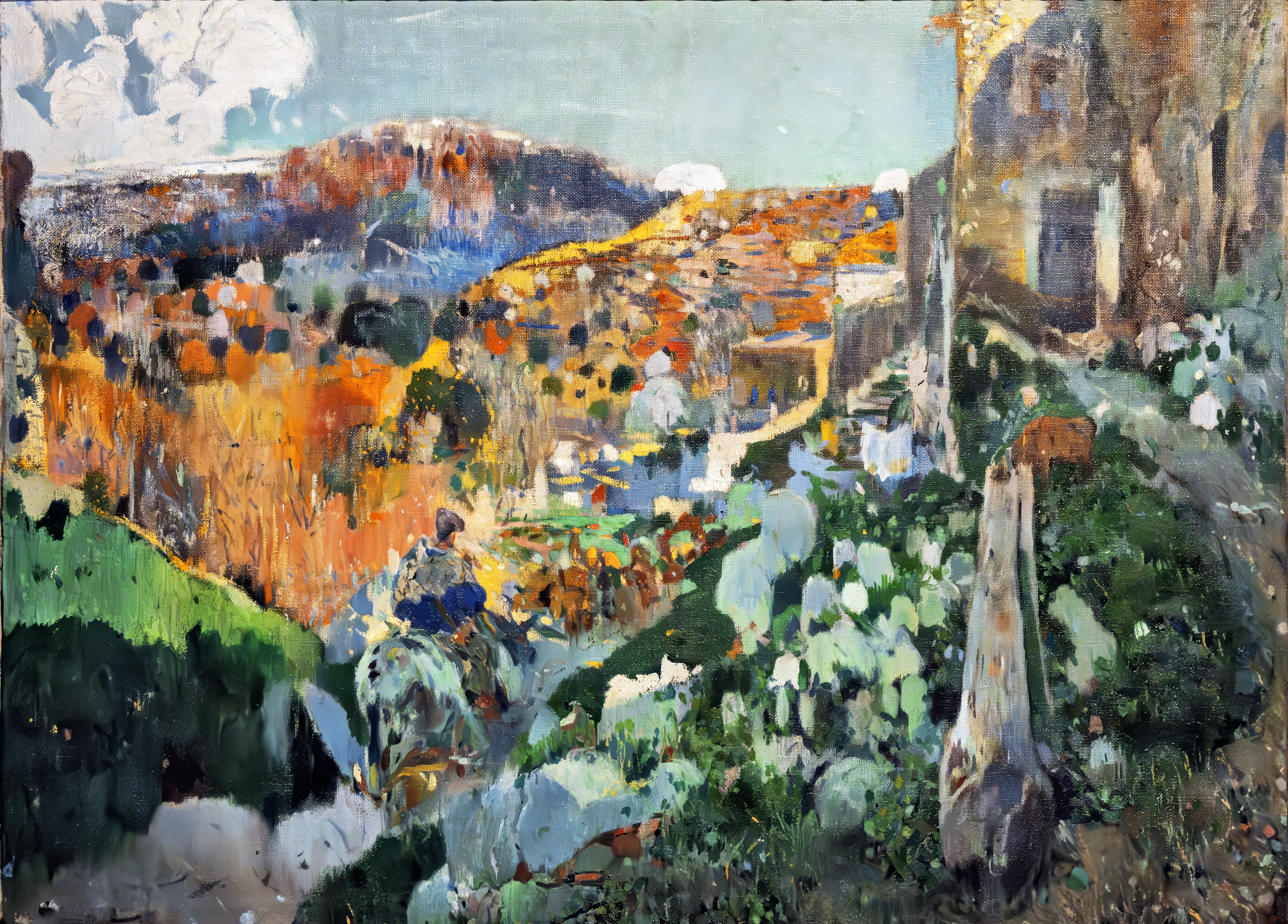
The Jewel (circa 1910). 125.5 × 168.5 cm. Museu Nacional d'Art de Catalunya.

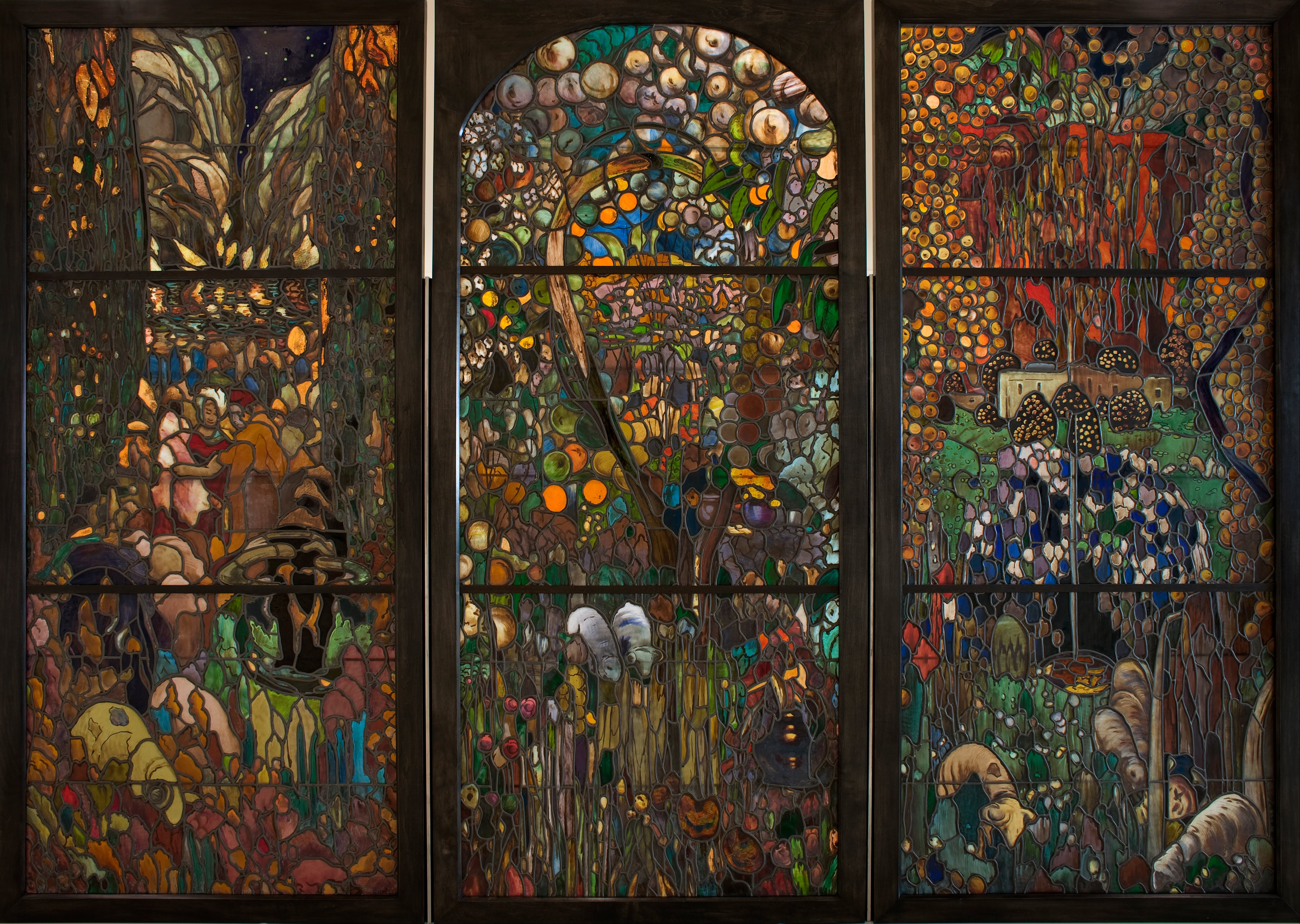
Stained glass triptych: El Gorg Blau (circa 1911). 222 × 294 mm. Museu Nacional d'Art de Catalunya.

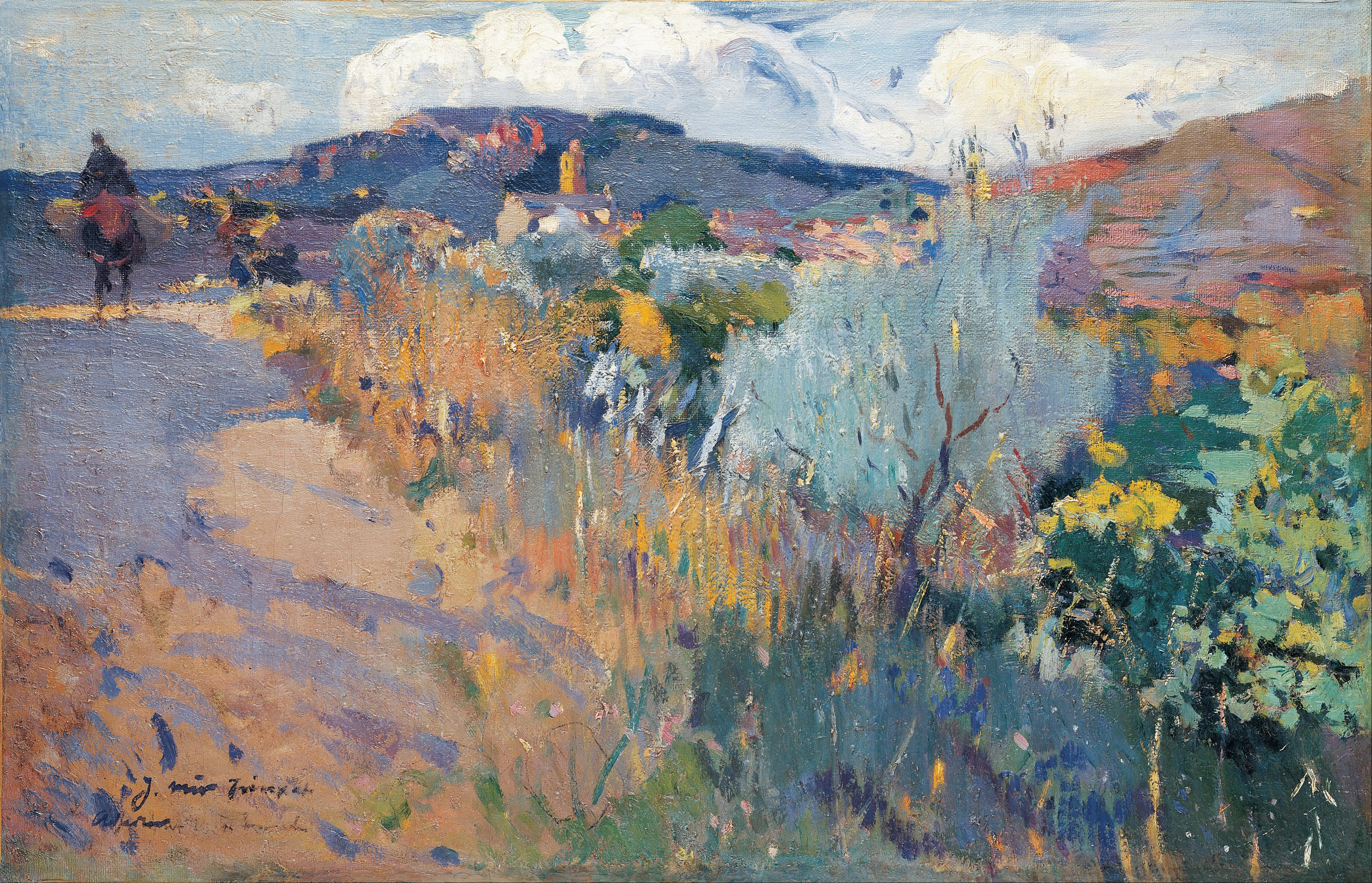
View of L'Aleixar (c. 1915-1919). 62.5 × 92.5 cm. Bilbao Fine Arts Museum.
- Fragmento de la decoración del comedor grande de la casa Trinxet (Fragment de la décoration de la grande salle à manger de la maison Trinxet), vers 1903 huile sur toile, 142 x 174 cm. Fundación Francisco Godia, Barcelone.
