= Miquel Utrillo =

Spanish art critic, scenographer, painter and engineer (1862–1934)

Miquel Utrillo i Morlius
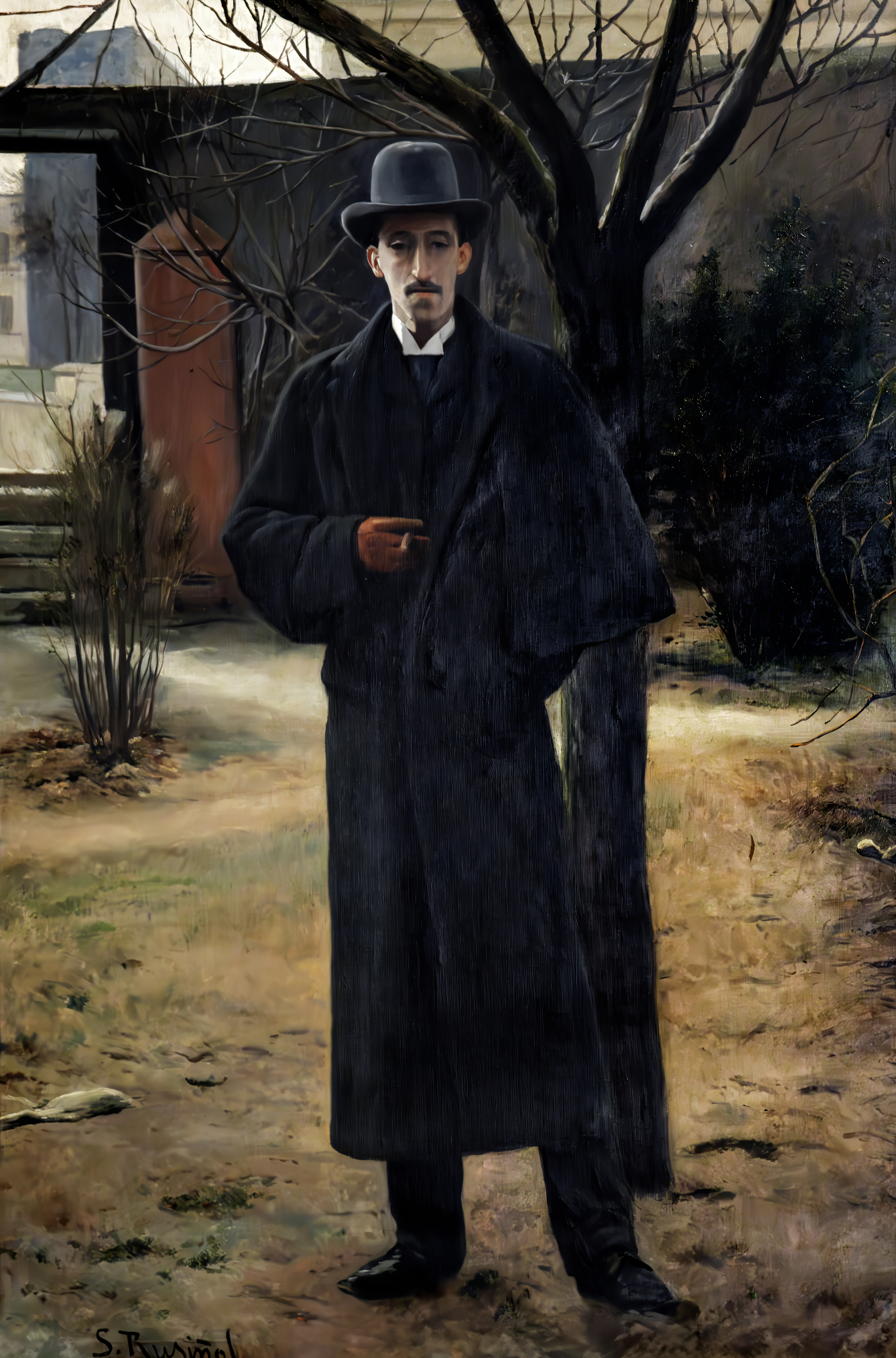
- Miquel Utrillo; portrait by Santiago Rusiñol
- Born: February 16, 1862; Barcelona
- Died: January 20, 1934 (aged 71); Sitges
- Education: Institut National Agronomique
- Known for: Art critic, scenographer, painter, engineer
- Spouse: Lola Vidal
- Partner: Suzanne Valadon
- Children: Maurice Utrillo
- Parents: Miquel Utrillo i Riu (father); Ramona Morlius i Borràs (mother)
- Awards: Legion of Honor
- Patrons: Charles Deering

Miquel Utrillo i Morlius (16 February 1862 in Barcelona – 20 January 1934 in Sitges) was a Spanish art critic, scenographer, painter and engineer.

== Biography ==
He was born to the lawyer, Miquel Utrillo i Riu, originally from Tremp, a liberal republican who lived in exile in France from 1867 to 1882, and his wife, Ramona Morlius i Borràs, from Lleida. He and his mother followed his father into exile, and Miquel was given a bilingual education, initially in Avignon. Later, from 1880 to 1882, he studied engineering at the Institut National Agronomique. When his parents returned to Spain, he remained in Paris and was attracted to the artistic milieu in Montmartre. He was a frequent visitor to the cabaret, Le Chat Noir, where he met the artist, Suzanne Valadon, and became her lover. In 1883, she gave birth to a son; Maurice. She never identified the father, and was known to have had other lovers.

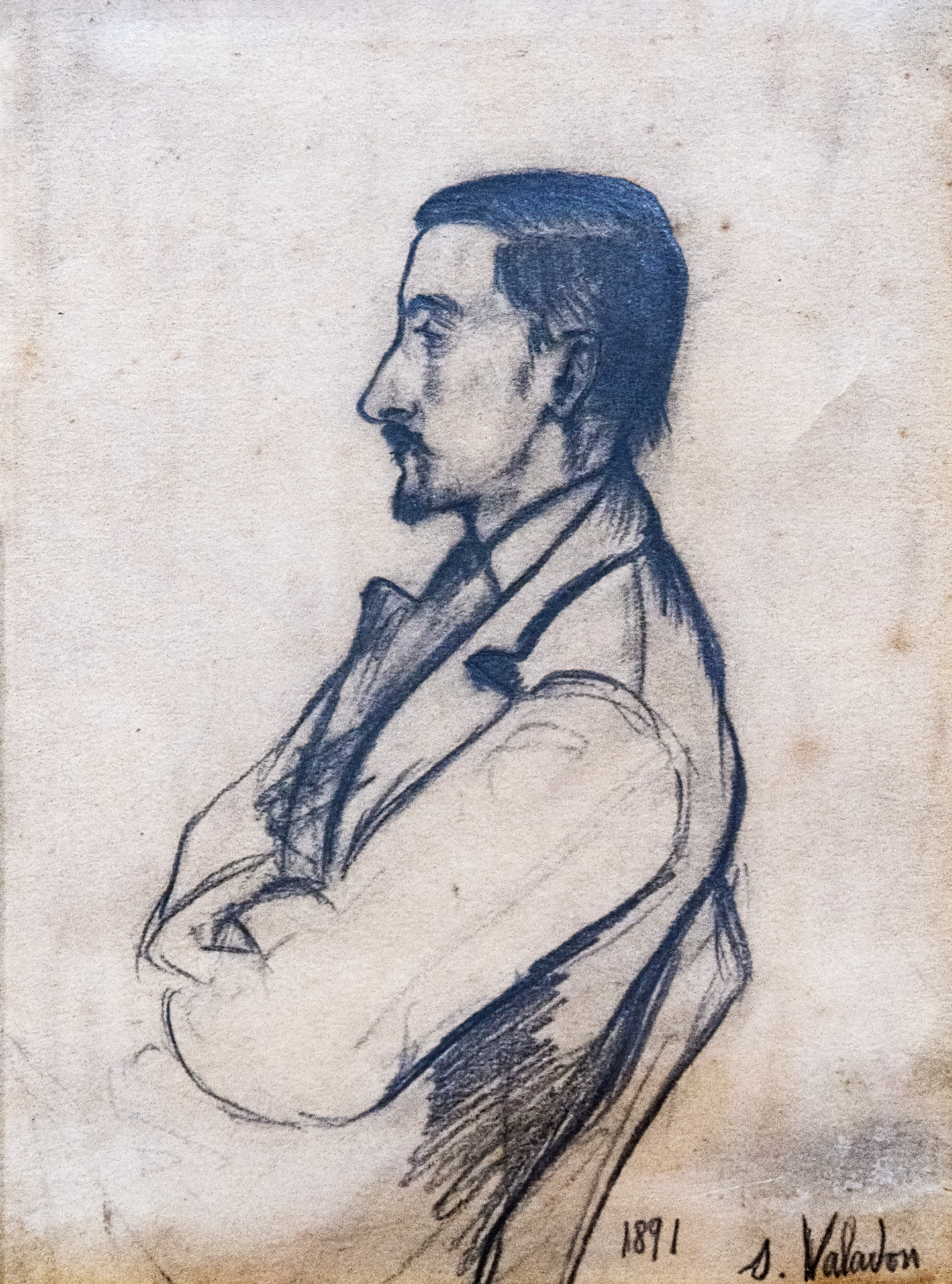
Drawing of Utrillo by Suzanne Valadon

In 1885, after travelling to Belgium and Germany, he joined his father in Madrid. Three years later, he was part of a team of engineers who helped prepare the 1888 Barcelona Universal Exposition. The following year, he returned to Paris, as a correspondent for the newspaper, La Vanguardia, to report on the Exposition Universelle. He would stay there to work as an art critic. In 1890, he met Suzanne, who was now calling her son "Maurice Utrillo Valadon". In 1891, after much contention, he agreed to sign papers declaring his paternity. That same year, he worked on a theatrical production, with music provided by Erik Satie. Two years later, after discovering that she was having an affair with Satie, he left France for Chicago, to participate in the World's Columbian Exposition. Chicago was not to his liking, however, so he went to back to Paris when the exposition closed.

After two years there, he returned to his homeland; moving in with Santiago Rusiñol, a friend from his previous stay in Spain, who had become part of a growing artistic community in Sitges. There, he worked to develop his talents as a painter, while once again providing art criticism for La Vanguardia. Later, their collective launched an annual "Festes modernistes de Sitges", for which he provided scenography and posters. He also worked with the poet, Joan Maragall, to produce illustrations for his translation of Iphigénie en Tauride, an opera by Christoph Willibald Gluck. From 1899 to 1903, together with Rusiñol and Ramon Casas, he helped produce Pèl & Ploma, an artistic and literary journal.

In 1910, he married Lola Vidal, a sister of the painter Lluïsa Vidal, and a widow with a grown son, whom he had known for fifteen years. Around that same time, the Franco-American art collector, Charles Deering, commissioned Utrillo to design a space near Sitges to house his collection. For this purpose, Deering bought the Hospital de Sant Joan Baptista, dating from the Middle Ages. He would work on this project until 1919. In the meantime, however, he continued his usual activities, which included helping to organize the Exhibition of French Arts in Barcelona. This earned him the Legion of Honor in 1916.

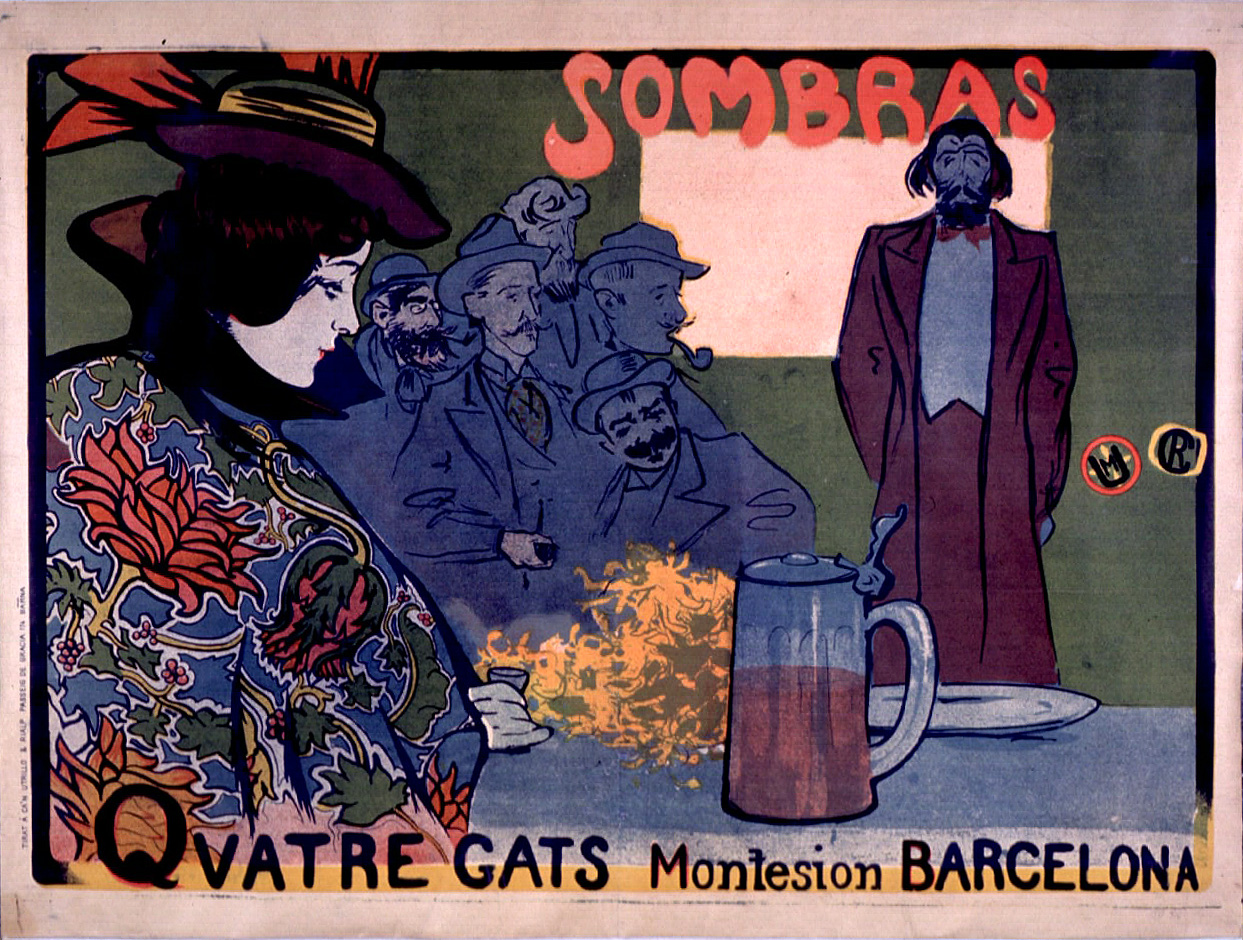
Poster for the shadow theatre at Els Quatre Gats

The year 1921 saw the beginning of what would be known as the "Affaire Deering". Among many other complaints, it involved accusations that Utrillo had stolen parts of the old building for his personal use. The issues were never resolved. His reputation was tarnished but, ultimately, he was affected more by the European economic crisis. This was alleviated somewhat by his participation in the 1929 Barcelona International Exposition, where he helped design and create the architectural museum known as the "Poble Espanyol".

In 1930, his friend Rusiñol made efforts to rehabilitate Utrillo's reputation, as part of converting his home into what is now known as the Cau Ferrat Museum. Rusiñol died in 1931, followed by his wife Lola, in 1932. During that time, he was working on a history of the local artistic community, which was published after his death in 1934.
