= Casa Trinxet =

1904 building by Josep Puig i Cadafalch

Coordinates: 41°23′39″N 2°09′24″E

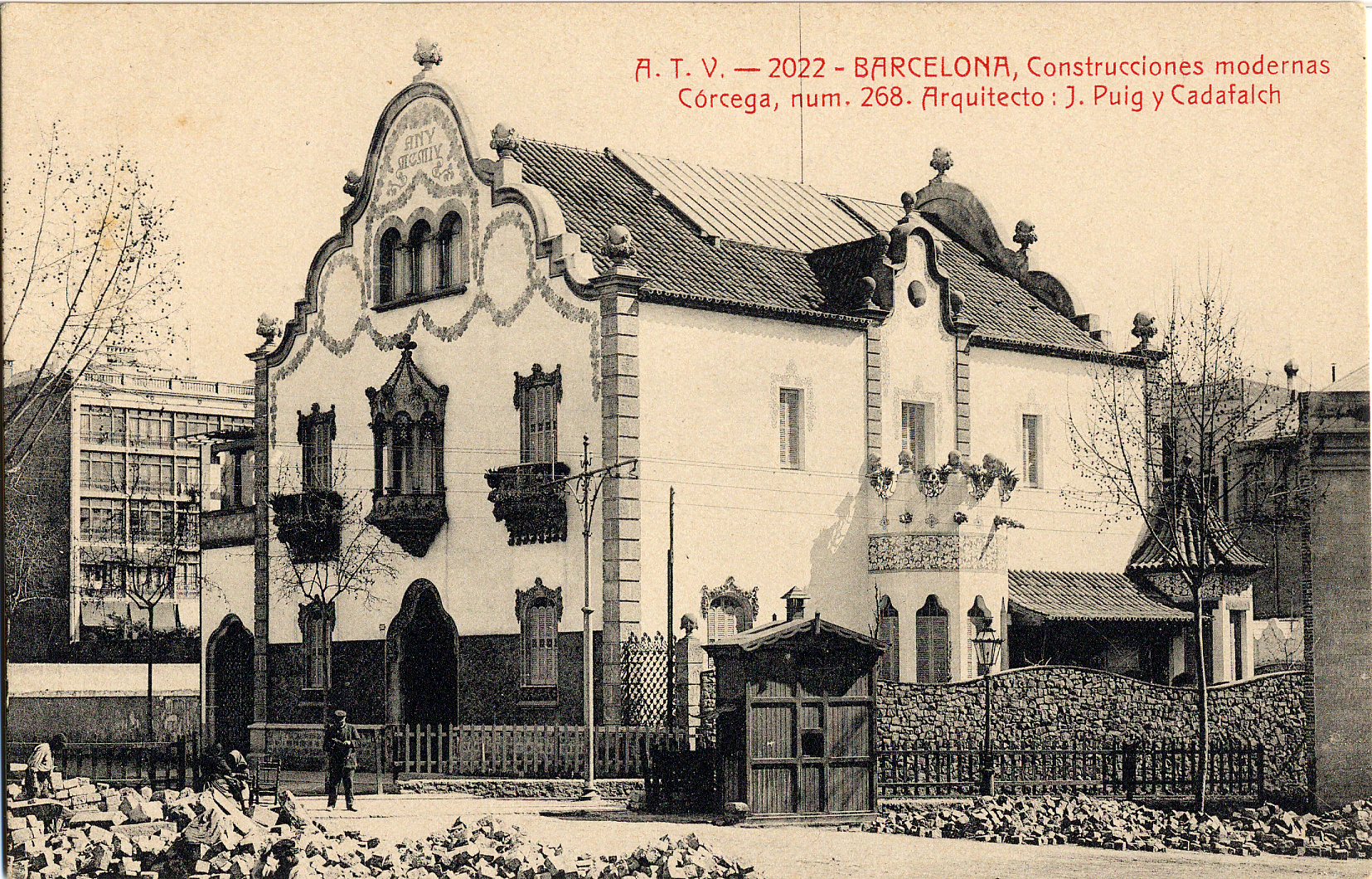
Casa Trinxet

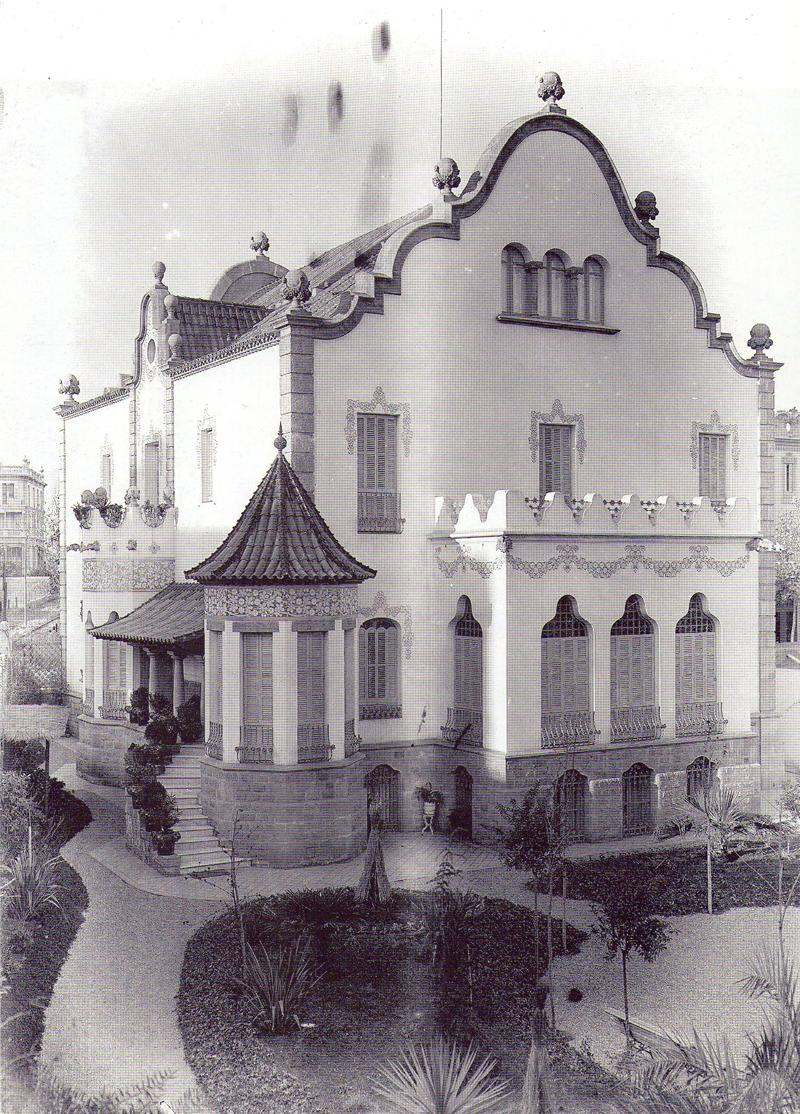
Back facade of the Casa trinxet.

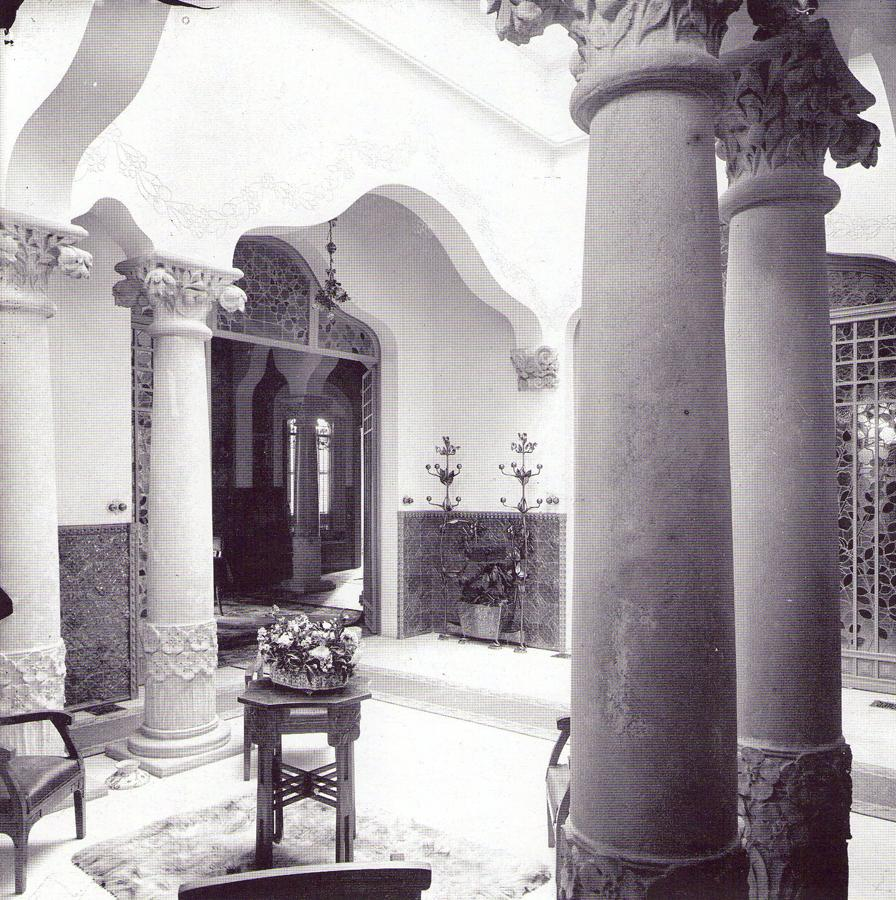
A courtyard of the Casa Trinxet.

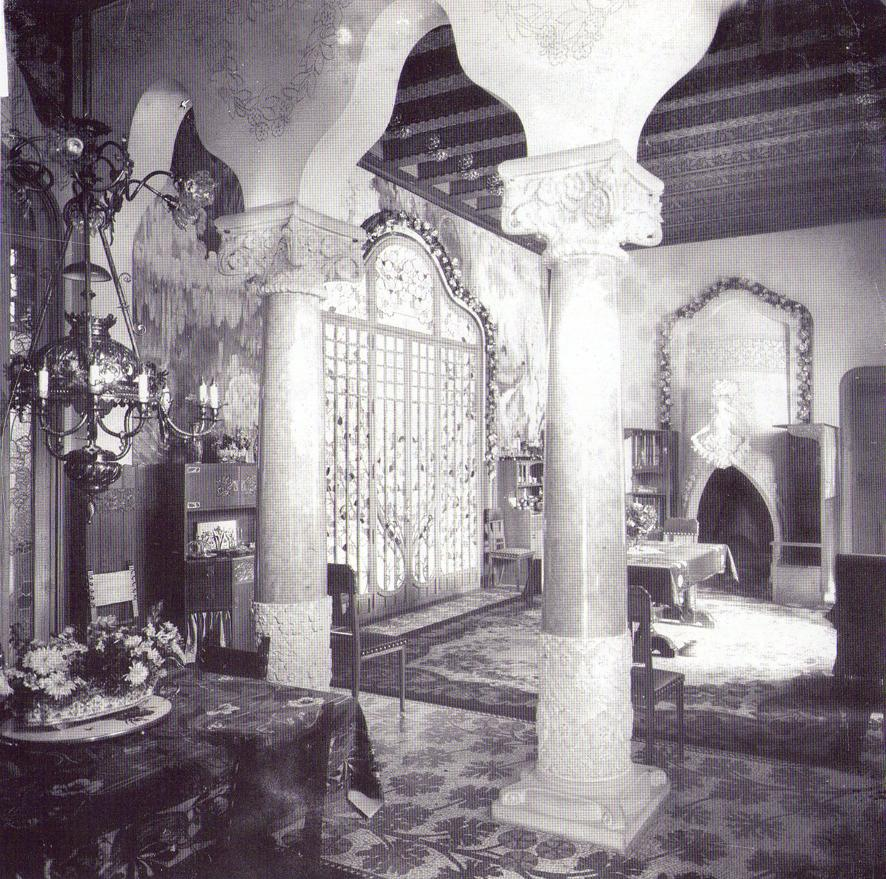
Interior of the Casa Trinxet.

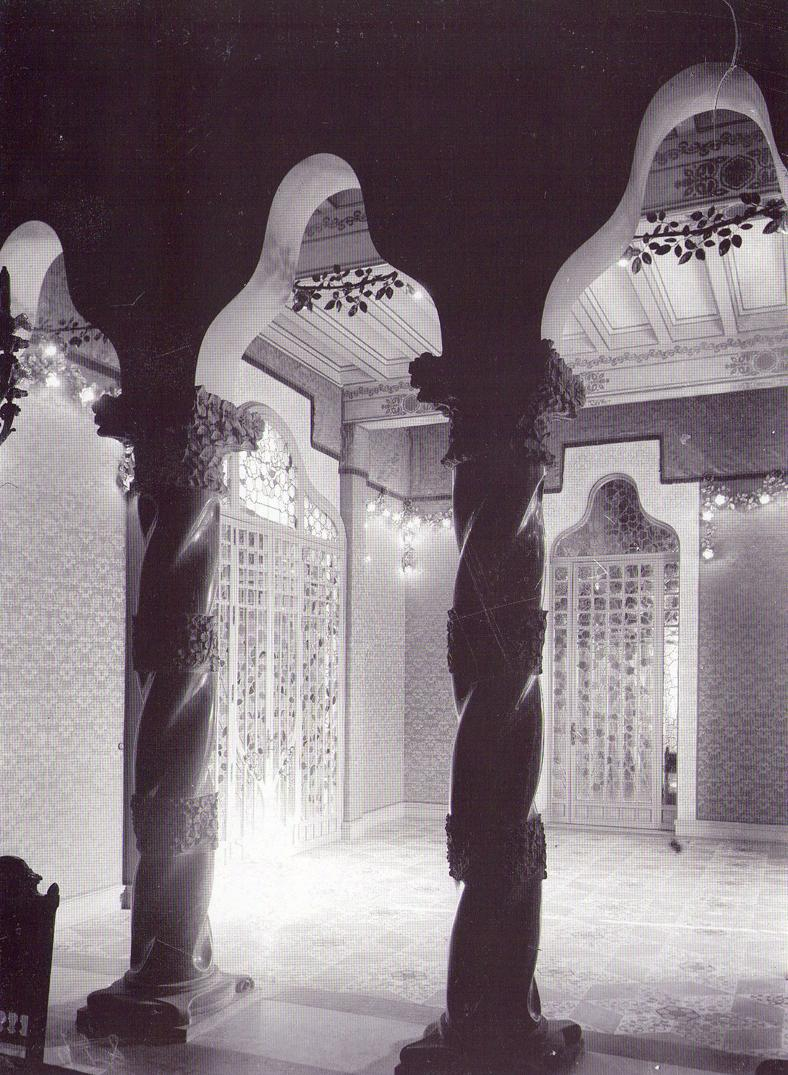
Casa Trinxet.

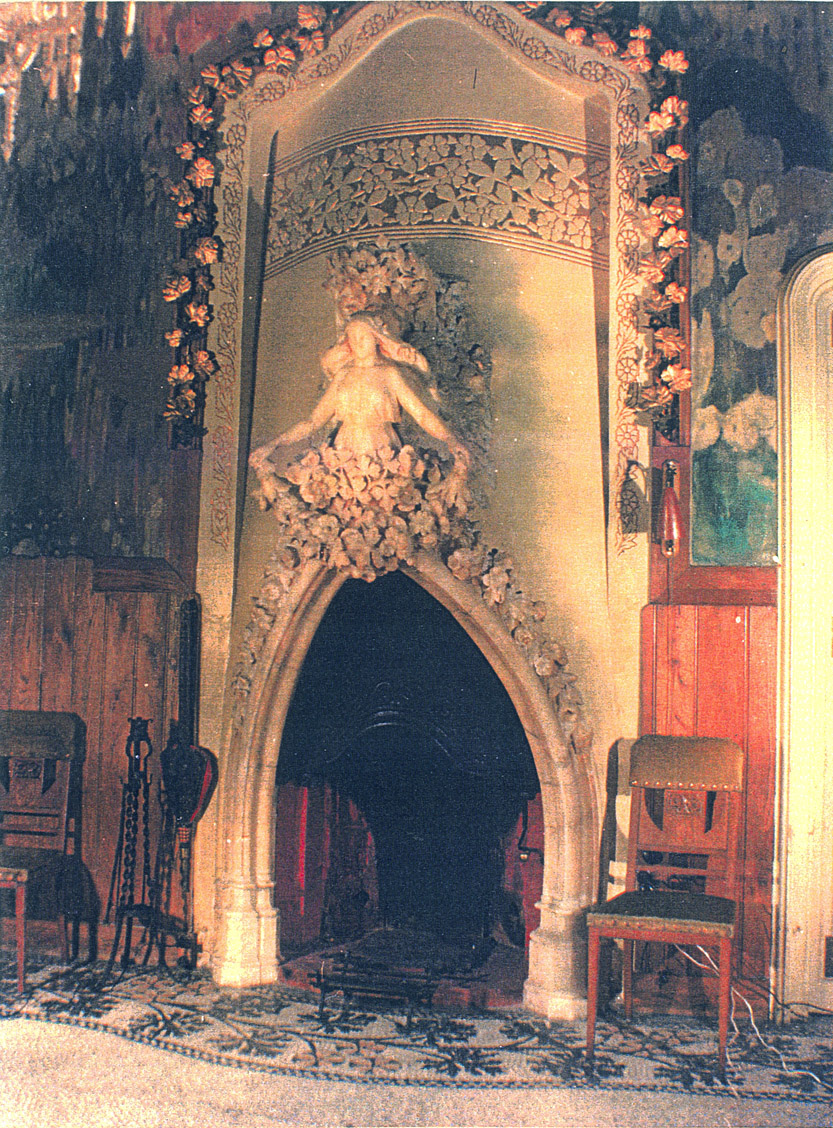
Detail of the alabaster fireplace made by Llimona for the Casa Trinxet.

Casa Trinxet was a building designed by the Catalan Modernisme architect Josep Puig i Cadafalch (also architect of Casa Amatller) and built during the years 1902–1904, officially considered completed in 1904. It was located at the crossroads of Carrer Balmes and Carrer del Consell de Cent, in the Eixample district of Barcelona, Catalonia, Spain. Casa Trinxet was "one of the jewels of Barcelona Modernisme" and one of the buildings of Barcelona's Illa de la Discòrdia ("Block of Discord"), because of competing attitudes among Domènech i Montaner, Puig i Cadafalch and Antoni Gaudí.

The building was commissioned by Avelino Trinxet Casas, Mir Trinxet's Uncle, who belonged to the textile industrial family Trinxet, from Barcelona.

== Mir Trinxet paintings ==
Joaquin Mir Trinxet (Barcelona, 1873–1940) contributed several murals to the house, after his trip to Majorca with Santiago Rusiñol, where he met the mystic Belgian painter William Degouve de Nuncques in 1899, and before his move to Reus. He started his work on the house in 1903

This being his major work, Mir captured his total conception of the landscape.

Mir Trinxet's style is curious in this house, paint impressionistically scattered, in contrast to his other work that is decidedly less fragmented. It is a blur of colored vision, a haze of dots that travel across the eye. In the house, Mir Trinxet use a technique that gives the painting a mysticism, an almost magical luminosity, as flowers glow as orange and yellow lamps on a bed of lush green. Here we have all the warmth and freshness of a garden, intensity provided in colored blooms, and dew that clings to leaves and grass seeped into a crisp pale green. It is a painting that transports its viewer, absorbs them into an atmosphere, fitting for a mural, which has the power to change the room it commands.

These mural paintings were the most artistic period of Mir Trinxet.

== Catalan Modernism in architecture and painting ==
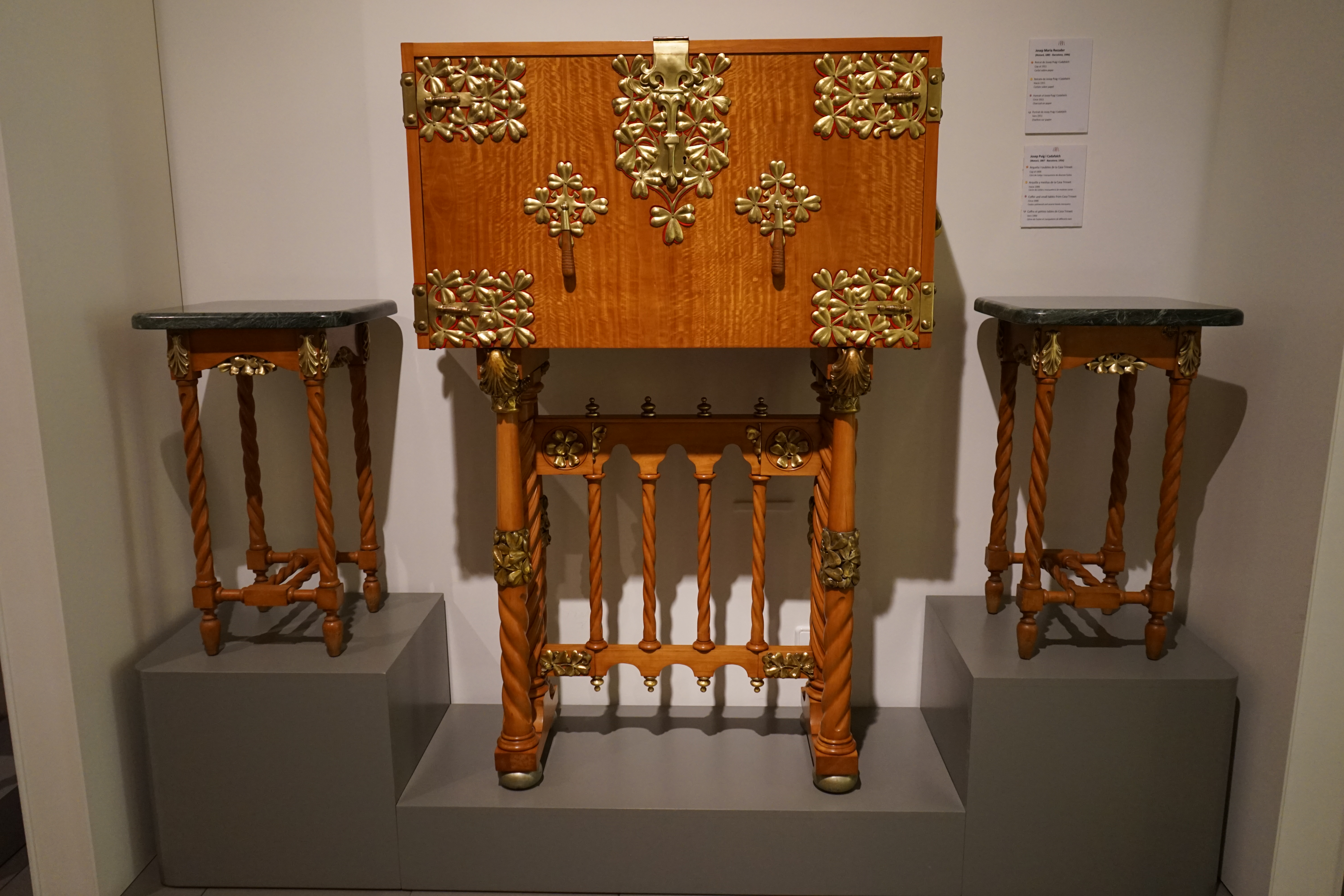
Coffer and small tables from Casa Trinxet made in Ceylon satinwood with marquetry. By Josep Puig i Cadafalch ca. 1906. On display at Museu del Modernisme Català, Barcelona

In the Spanish histories of art, not only did a thriving school indeed exist in the main centers of Barcelona and Madrid, but its character was wide-ranging, bountiful, and in some cases astonishingly original. The painters who pushed Spain into the modern era in art are hardly familiar names outside Spain. Painters like Bereute, Santiago Rusiñol, Casas, Anglada, Pinazo, Juaquin Mir Trinxet, Regoyos, and many others, contributed to the character of Spanish painting at the dawn of the 20th century.

The Catalan modernism is often understood as an equivalent to a number of fin-de-siècle art movements, such as Art Nouveau, Jugendstil, Secessionism, and Liberty style, and was active from roughly 1888 (the First International Exhibition of Barcelona) to 1911 (the death of Joan Maragall). The Modernisme movement was centered on the city of Barcelona, and is best known for its architectural expression, especially the work of Antoni Gaudí, but was also significant in sculpture, poetry, theatre and painting.

The earliest example of Modernista architecture is the café "Castell dels tres Dragons" designed by Lluís Domènech i Montaner in the "Parc de la Ciutadella" for the 1888 Universal Exhibition. It is a search for a particular style for Catalonia drawing on Medieval and Arab styles. Like the currents known in other countries as Art Nouveau, Jugendstil, Stile Liberty, Modern Style or Sezessionstil, Modernisme is basically derived from the English Arts and Crafts movement and the Gothic Revival. As well as combining a rich variety of historically-derived elements, it is characterized by the predominance of the curve over the straight line, by rich decoration and detail, by the frequent use of vegetal and other organic motifs, the taste for asymmetry, a refined aestheticism, and the dynamic shapes.

Influential architects were Antoni Gaudí, Lluís Domènech i Montaner and Josep Puig i Cadafalch, and later Josep Maria Jujol and Enrique Nieto.

1893 saw the formation in Barcelona of the independent Colla del Safrá group including, more particularly, painters Isidre Nonell i Monturiol and Joaquim Mir i Trinxet.

La Ilustració Catalana published on 10 March 1907: "Spaniards....made already comments....about the works of Domènech, Puig i Cadafalch, Sagnier, Gaudí and others ".

By 1910, Modernisme had been accepted by the bourgeoisie and had turned into a fad. It was around this time that Noucentista artists started to ridicule the rebel ideas of Modernisme and propelled a more bourgeois art.

== History ==
During the modernism period, the catalán bourgeoisie commissioned buildings (ocupping the principal floor) and the most wealthy constructed a house. The Casa Trinxet, like many buildings constructed at the time, it was named after its owner. It was built for the Trinxet family. Avelino Trinxet was also the owner of the Trinxet fabric, build in 1907 by Joan Alsina i Arús en Can Trinxet, in Hospitalet, near Barcelona, in a modernist fashion.

It was located near to the Casa Serra, also planned by Josep Puig i Cadafalch (in 1903) which both in its time were two of the best examples of single-family urban houses in Barcelona.

Casa Trinxet was a triumph of Modernism, exquisite in design and thus entirely decadent when it came to decoration. It had a spectacular interior. The vidres were made in picture-style appearance, like the commissioned by Trinxet to the Rigalt, Granell y Cía. firm in 1910–1912, following instructions from Joaquín Mir Trinxet.

The Casa Trinxet was demolished in 1968 despite attempts by artists and intellectuals to save it for conversion into a museum of Modernism, in the period of Porcioles council, for the builders Nuñez i Navarro.

Lastly, movements were late to save Casa Trinxet.

== Noteworthy ==
- The building was awarded. Between 1899 and 1906, the Arts Building Annual Award (Concurso annual de edificios artísticos) awarded modernist pieces, like the Casa Calvet, the Casa Lleó Morera and the Casa Trinxet.
- "All I want is for my works to lighten the heart and flood the eyes and the soul with light." That was how Joaquim Mir, "one of the most famous and influential artists in Catalan art circles in the early 20th century", summed up his private art manifesto in 1928

== Casa Trinxet in the literature ==
Mentioned in more than two dozen books, including:

- Torres García: Pasión Clásica
- Miscel•lània en homenatge a Joan Ainaud de Lasarte
- Cuadernos de arquitectura: Números 63-66
- Art català contemporani
- Barcelona modernista
- Joan Rubió i Bellver y la fortuna del gaudinismo
- El pintor Joaquín Mir, by Josep Pla

== Antecedents of the Casa Trinxet ==
Antecedents of Casa Trinxet were Casa Amatller and Casa Batlló. In the first case, in 1898, the chocolatier industrial Antoni Amatller, bought a building in 1875 to establish his family. He commissioned the transformation of the house to Josep Puig i Cadafalch, which decided give the building an appearance of urban gotic palace, like the solution he employed lately in the Baron de Quadras palace ( Palau del Baró de Quadras) and in the Casa Macaya.

== Bibliography ==
- Urbanization General Treatise
- Gaudi: complete work. ISBN 9788496137295.
- El pintor Joaquín Mir, by Josep Pla
- Interior of Barcelona in the 19th century

== See also ==
- Bohemianism
- Fin de siècle
- Illa de la Discòrdia
- List of Modernista buildings in Barcelona
- List of missing landmarks in Spain
