= Casa Bonet (Barcelona) =

House in Barcelona, Spain

- Casa Bonet
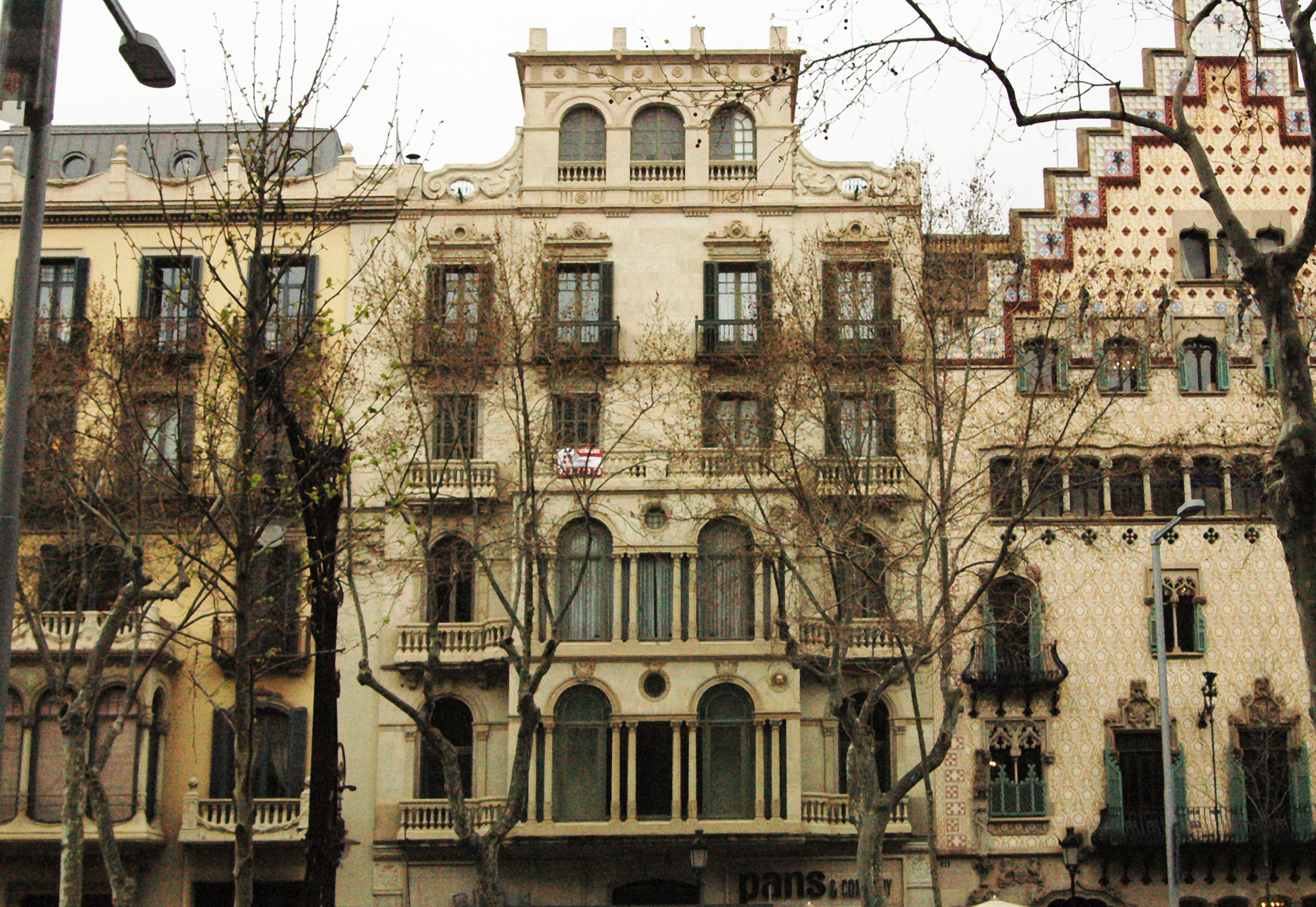
- Casa Bonet

- Location within Barcelona
- Alternative names: Casa Josefina Bonet

General information
- Type: Town house
- Location: Passeig de Gràcia 39, Barcelona, Spain
- Coordinates: 41.39143°N 2.16517°E
- Completed: 1887
- Renovated: 1915
- Client: Delfina Bonet

Technical details
- Material: stone

Design and construction
- Designations: Bé Cultural d'Interès Local (BCIL) 08019/1517

Renovating team
- Architect: Marceliano Coquillat

Casa Bonet is a house in Barcelona, Catalonia, Spain, located on the Passeig de Gràcia in the Eixample district. Originally built in 1887, it was remodelled in an eclectic Neo-Baroque style by Marcel·lí Coquillat in 1915. The house forms part of a row of buildings known as the Illa de la Discòrdia (or Mansana de la Discòrdia, the "Block of Discord").

The Illa de la Discòrdia derives its name from its clashing architectural styles, and while the block is best known for its Modernista architecture (most notably Antoni Gaudí's Casa Batlló of 1906), the more conservative classical style of Casa Bonet contrasts sharply with its more opulent neighbours.

== History ==
Casa Bonet was built in 1887 by Jaume Brossa and was known as the Casa Torruella. In 1915, Delfina Bonet commissioned the architect Marcel·lí Coquillat to redesign the facade, remodelling it in an Italianate Neo-Baroque style with a two-storey loggia and neo-baroque ornamental details decorating the upper floor lintels.

Today the building is occupied by the Barcelona Perfume Museum.
