= Perfume Museum (Barcelona) =

Museum in Barcelona

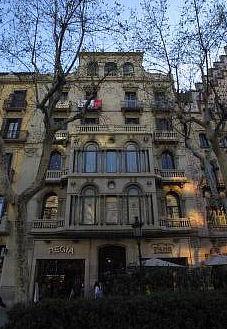

- Location within Catalonia
- Established: 1961
- Location: Eixample, Barcelona
- Coordinates: 41.3913°N 2.1650°E
- Type: Collection
- Website: Official website (in Spanish)

The Perfume Museum of Barcelona, officially known in Catalan as Museu del Perfum, was founded in 1961 to exhibit an evolution of perfume vessels throughout the ages.

== Description ==
The museum presents a wide collection of nearly 5,000 essence and perfume vessels from different cultures and civilizations. The collection covers long historical periods ranging from Egyptian vases, Greek pottery, Roman and Punic glass, Arabic and Eastern recipients, to an interesting collection of essences jars made of porcelain, crystal and noble materials, from 17th to 19th centuries.

There is also an exhibition of industrialized perfumery, from its beginning to the present day.

== Collection ==
The collection includes very special items such as a perfume box containing two essence recipients which belonged to Queen Marie Antoinette and a scent bottle called "Le Roi Soleil" designed by Salvador Dalí, as well as many other unique pieces in the world of perfumery.
