= Casa Batlló =

Building by Antoni Gaudí in Barcelona, Spain

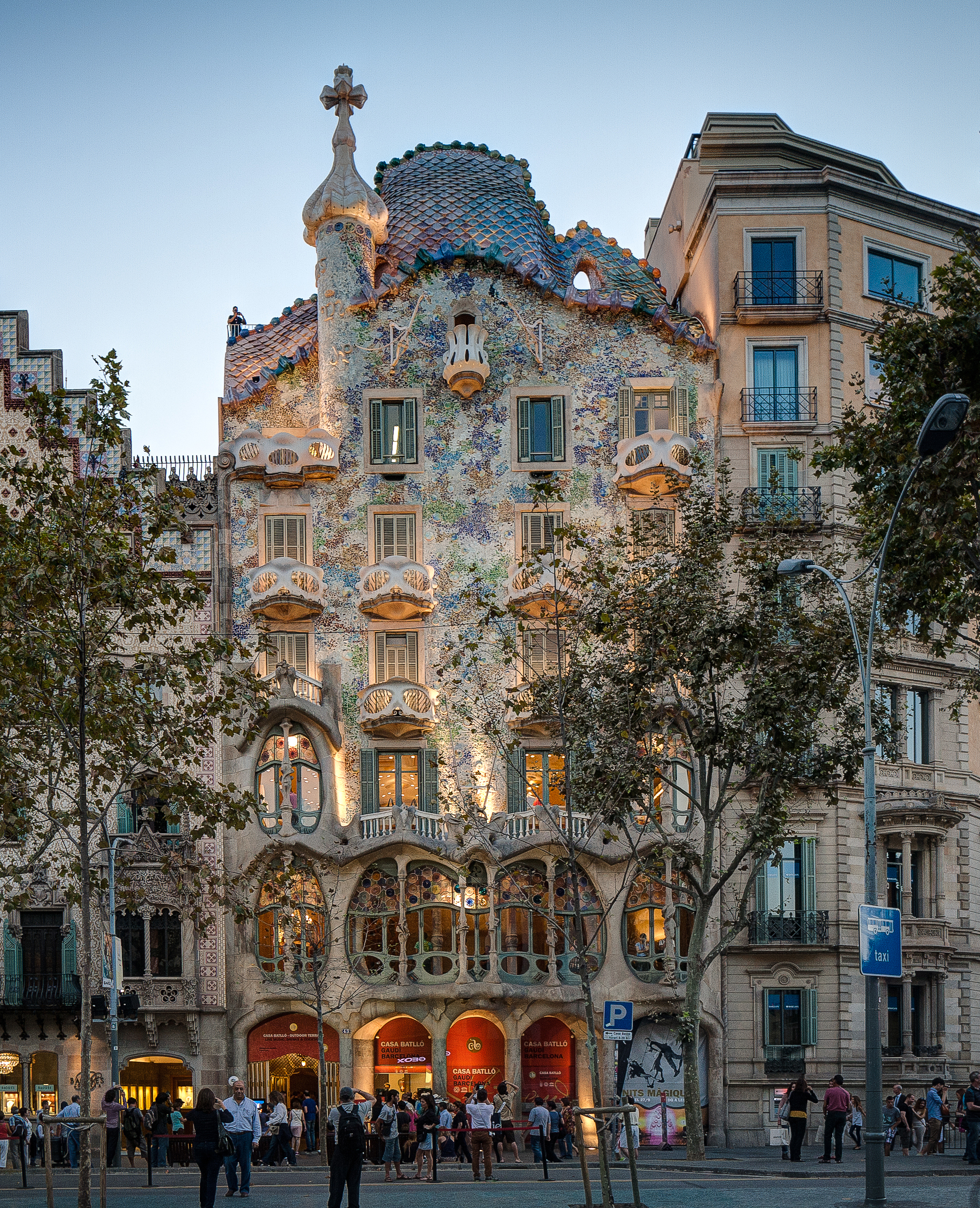
- Former names: House of bones
- Alternative names: Casa dels ossos (House of Bones)

General information
- Location: Barcelona, Spain
- Coordinates: 41°23′30″N 2°09′54″E

Technical details
- Material: stone, metal, wood, ceramic

Renovating team
- Architect: Antoni Gaudí
- Other designers: Domènec Sugrañes i Gras, Josep Canaleta, Joan Rubió

Website
- www.casabatllo.es/en/

UNESCO World Heritage Site
- Part of: Works of Antoni Gaudí
- Criteria: Cultural: (i), (ii), (iv)
- Reference: 320-006
- Inscription: 1984 (8th Session)
- Extensions: 2005

Spanish Cultural Heritage
- Type: Non-movable
- Criteria: Monument
- Designated: 24 July 1969
- Reference no.: RI-51-0003815

Casa Batlló (Catalan pronunciation: [ˈkazə βəˈʎːo]) is a building in the center of Barcelona, Spain. It was designed by Antoni Gaudí, and is considered one of his masterpieces. A remodel of a previously built house, it was redesigned in 1904 by Gaudí (although the actual construction had not begun at this point) and has been refurbished several times since. Gaudí's assistants Domènec Sugrañes i Gras, Josep Canaleta and Joan Rubió also contributed to the renovation project.

Casa Batlló is located on the Passeig de Gràcia in the Eixample district and forms part of a row of houses known as the Illa de la Discòrdia (or Mansana de la Discòrdia, the "Block of Discord"), so named because it features four striking, and strikingly different, buildings by noted Modernista architects of Barcelona.

Like everything Gaudí designed, Casa Batlló is only identifiable as Modernisme in the broadest sense. The ground floor, in particular, has unusual tracery, irregular oval windows and sculpted stonework with sinuous, squiggly forms. There are few straight lines, and much of the façade is decorated with a colorful mosaic made of broken ceramic tiles (trencadís).

In 2005, Casa Batlló became a UNESCO World Heritage Site.

== History ==
=== Initial construction (1877) ===
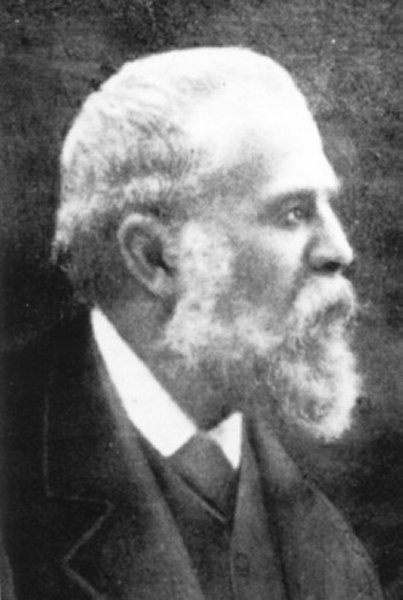
Antoni Gaudí in 1910

The building that is now Casa Batlló was built in 1877. Commissioned by Lluís Sala Sánchez, it was designed by Emili Sala Cortés, one of Gaudí's professors at Escuela Técnica Superior de Arquitectura de Barcelona. Cortés's building was a classical building without remarkable characteristics within the eclecticism traditional in the late 19th century. The building had a basement, a ground floor, four other floors, and a garden in the back.

=== Batlló family ===
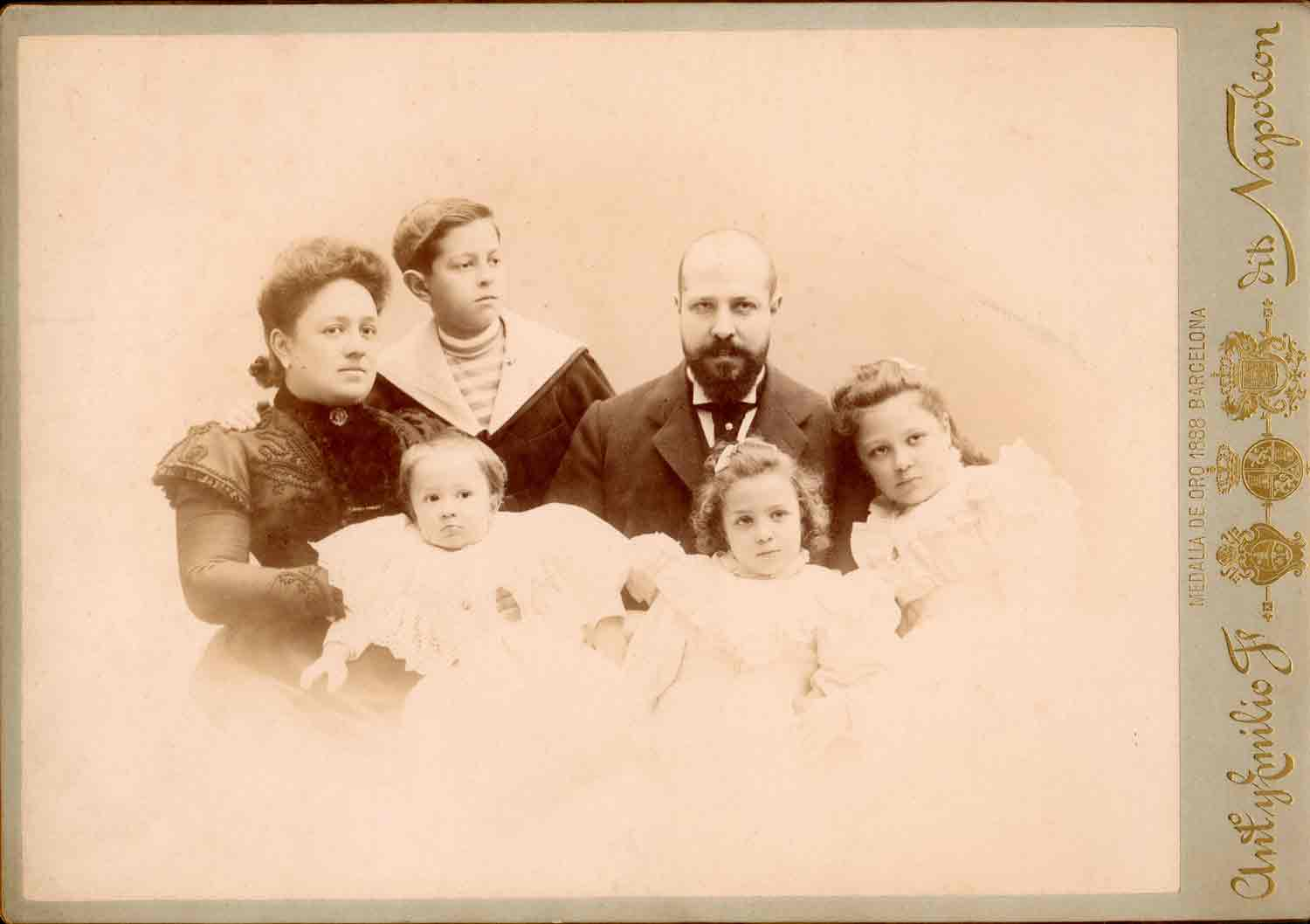
The Batlló family

The house was bought by Josep Batlló in 1903. The design of the house made the home undesirable to buyers but the Batlló family decided to buy it nonetheless due to its location in the middle of Passeig de Gràcia, which in the early 20th century was as a very upscale, fashionable area. It was an area where the prestigious family could draw attention to themselves.

The Barcelona-based architect and architecture critic Rafael Gomez-Moriana sketches in the social milieu, in which leading lights in the city's social-climbing upper class were striving to outdo one another:

By the end of the 19th century, the Eixample's Passeig de Gràcia had become Barcelona's most fashionable boulevard for the wealthiest bourgeois families. As Michael Eaude writes in his insightful 2024 book Antoni Gaudí, the city's wealthy industrialists "united to combat the anarchist‑led working class, but fought with each other to build the finest house on the street." A fierce rivalry started in 1898, when the chocolatier Antoni Amatller hired architect Josep Puig i Cadafalch to reform a building at Passeig de Gràcia 41, which Puig did by adding a Flemish stepped gable and lavish neo‑gothic ornament. This provoked Francesca Morera just a few doors away to hire architect Lluís Domènech i Montaner in 1902 to renovate a building she had inherited, in this case in a florid Catalan art nouveau style. Textile industrialist Josep Batlló, owner of the house adjacent to Casa Amatller, then hired Gaudí in 1904 to put the others to shame. The resulting clash of styles earned this city block the nickname illa de la discòrdia (block of discord).

The Batlló family was very well known in Barcelona for its contribution to the textile industry in the city. Josep Batlló i Casanovas was a textile industrialist who owned a few factories in the city. Batlló married Amàlia Godó Belaunzarán, from the family that founded the newspaper La Vanguardia. Josep wanted an architect who would design a house that was like no other and would stand out as being audacious and creative. Both he and his wife were open to anything; they decided not to limit Gaudí. Josep did not want his house to resemble any of the houses owned by the rest of the Batlló family, such as Casa Pía, built by the Josep Vilaseca. He chose the architect who had designed Park Güell because he wanted him to come up with an eye-catching, iconoclastic plan.

=== Renovation (1904-1906) ===
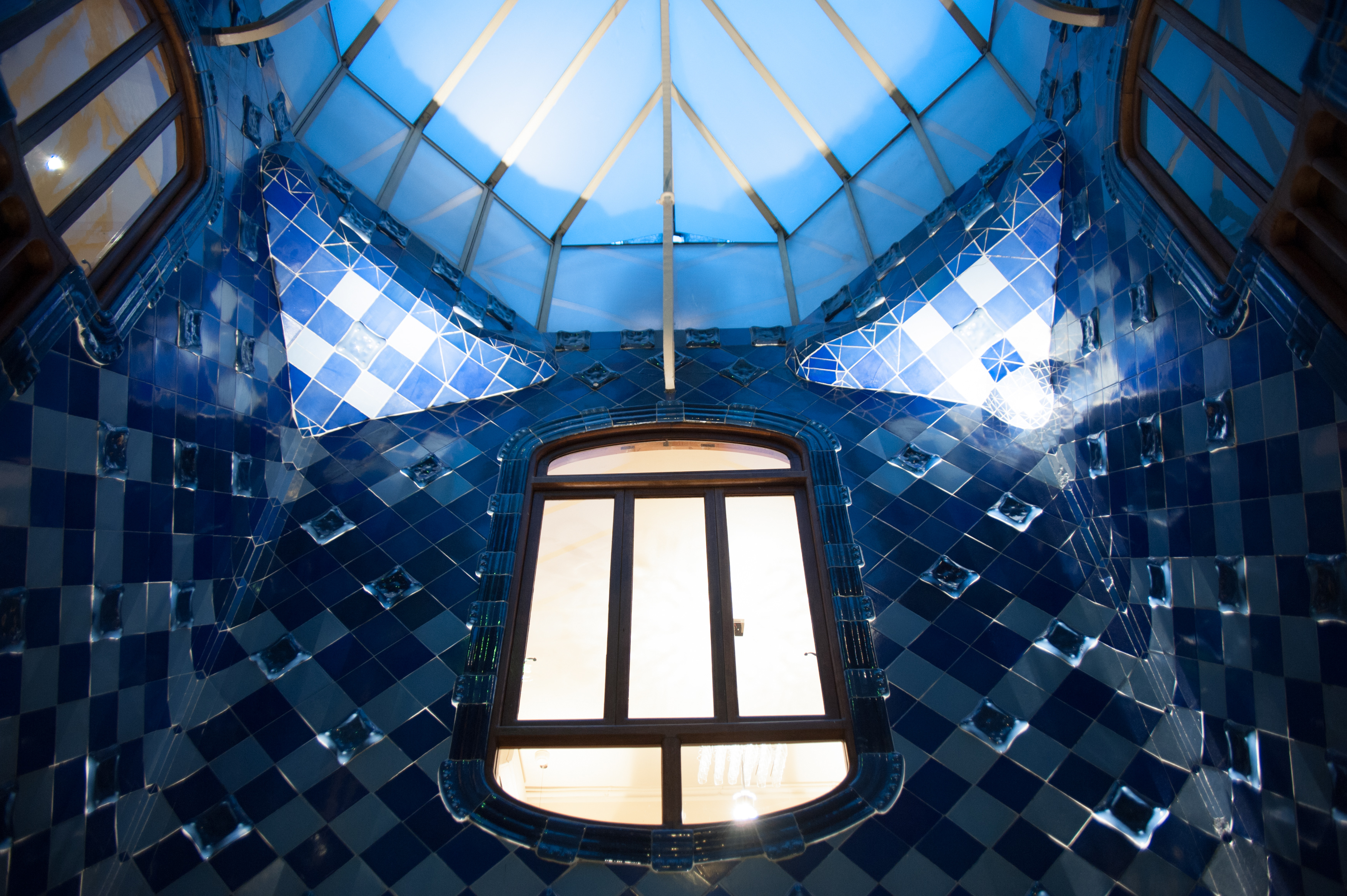
The atrium; Gaudí convinced Batlló to let him expand the central well of the building to let in light, instead of rebuilding.

In 1904, Josep Batlló hired Gaudí to design his home; at first his plans were to tear down the building and construct a completely new house. Gaudí convinced Josep that a renovation was sufficient and was also able to submit the planning application the same year. The building was finished and refurbished in 1906. Gaudí completely changed the main apartment, which became the residence for the Batlló family. He expanded the central well in order to supply light to the whole building and also added new floors. That same year (1906), the Barcelona City Council selected the house as a candidate for that year's best building award. (Despite Gaudí's trailblazing design, the award was given to another architect.)

=== Refurbishments ===
Josep Batlló died in 1934 and the house was kept in order by the wife until her death in 1940. After the death of the two parents, the house was kept and managed by the children until 1954. That year, an insurance company named Seguros Iberia acquired Casa Batlló and set up offices there. In 1970, the first refurbishment occurred mainly in several of the interior rooms of the house. In 1983, the exterior balconies were restored to their original color and a year later the exterior façade was illuminated in the ceremony of La Mercè.

=== Multiple uses ===
In 1993, the Bernat family, owners of Chupa Chups lollipops, bought the Casa Batlló. According to Elle Decor, the Bernats "made it a mission to properly restore and maintain the building." In 1999, the elevator was reformed to adapt it to modern standards preserving its original appearance. The project was by Joan Bassegoda Nonell and collaborators Bibiana Sciortino and Mario Andruet. Two years later, in 1995, Casa Batlló began to hire out its facilities for different events. More than 2,500 square meters of rooms within the building were rented out for many different functions. Due to the building's location and the beauty of the facilities being rented, the rooms of Casa Batlló were in very high demand and hosted many important events for the city.

== Design ==
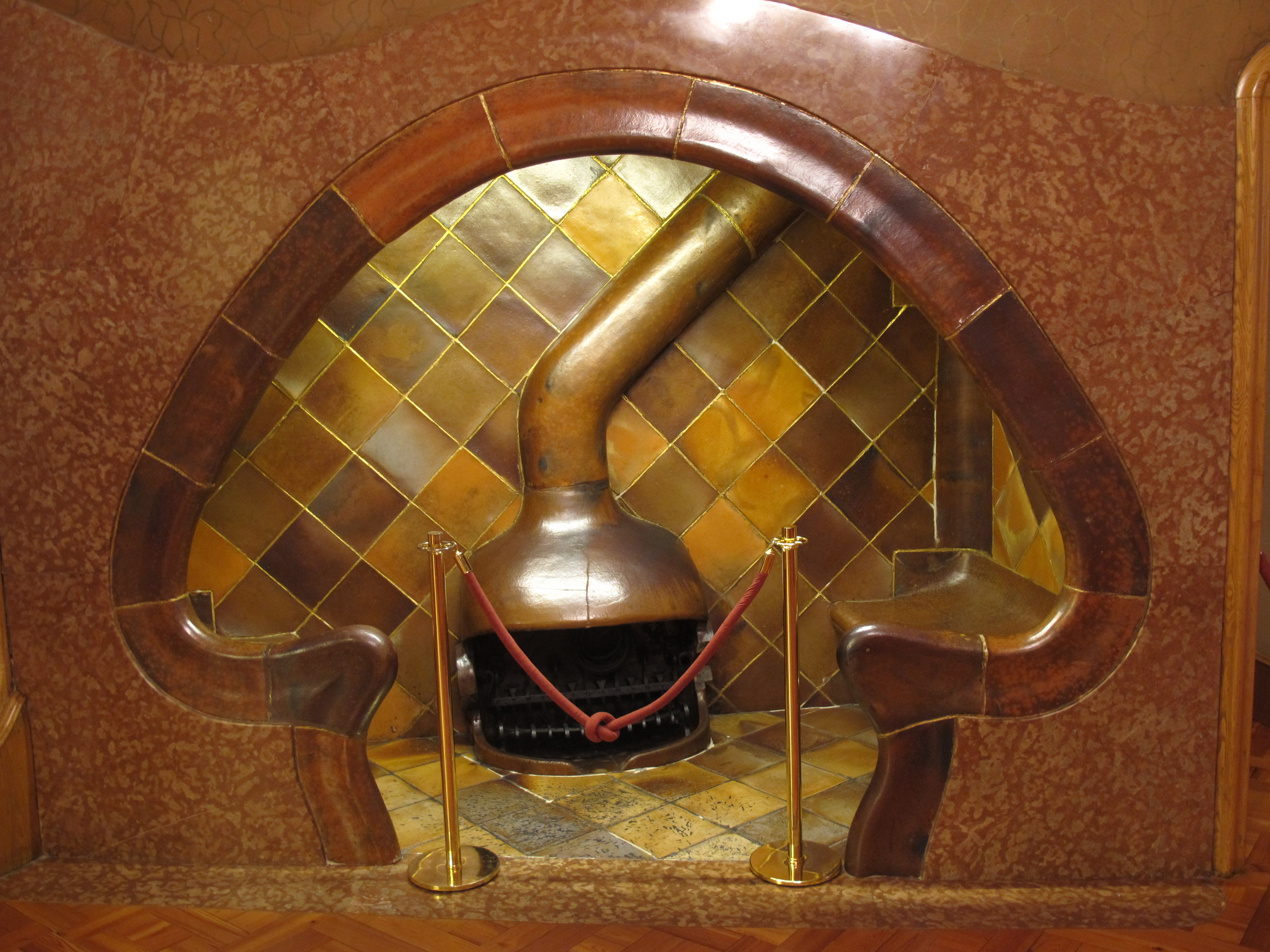
Casa Batlló fireplace seat

=== Overview ===
The local name for the building is Casa dels ossos (House of Bones), as its biomorphic aesthetic has a skeletal quality. Like everything Gaudí designed, Casa Batlló can only be considered Modernisme or Art Nouveau in the broadest sense. The ground floor is especially striking, with tracery, irregular oval windows, and flowing sculpted stone work. Much of the façade is decorated with a mosaic made of broken ceramic tiles (trencadís) that starts in shades of golden orange moving into greenish blues.

Gaudí seems to have wanted to avoid straight lines completely. "There are no straight lines or sharp corners in nature," he famously observed. "Therefore, buildings must have no straight lines or sharp corners." The roof is arched and was likened to the back of a dragon or dinosaur. A common theory about the building is that the rounded feature to the left of centre, terminating at the top in a turret and cross, represents the lance of Saint George (patron saint of Catalonia, Gaudí's home), which has been plunged into the back of the dragon.

=== Loft ===
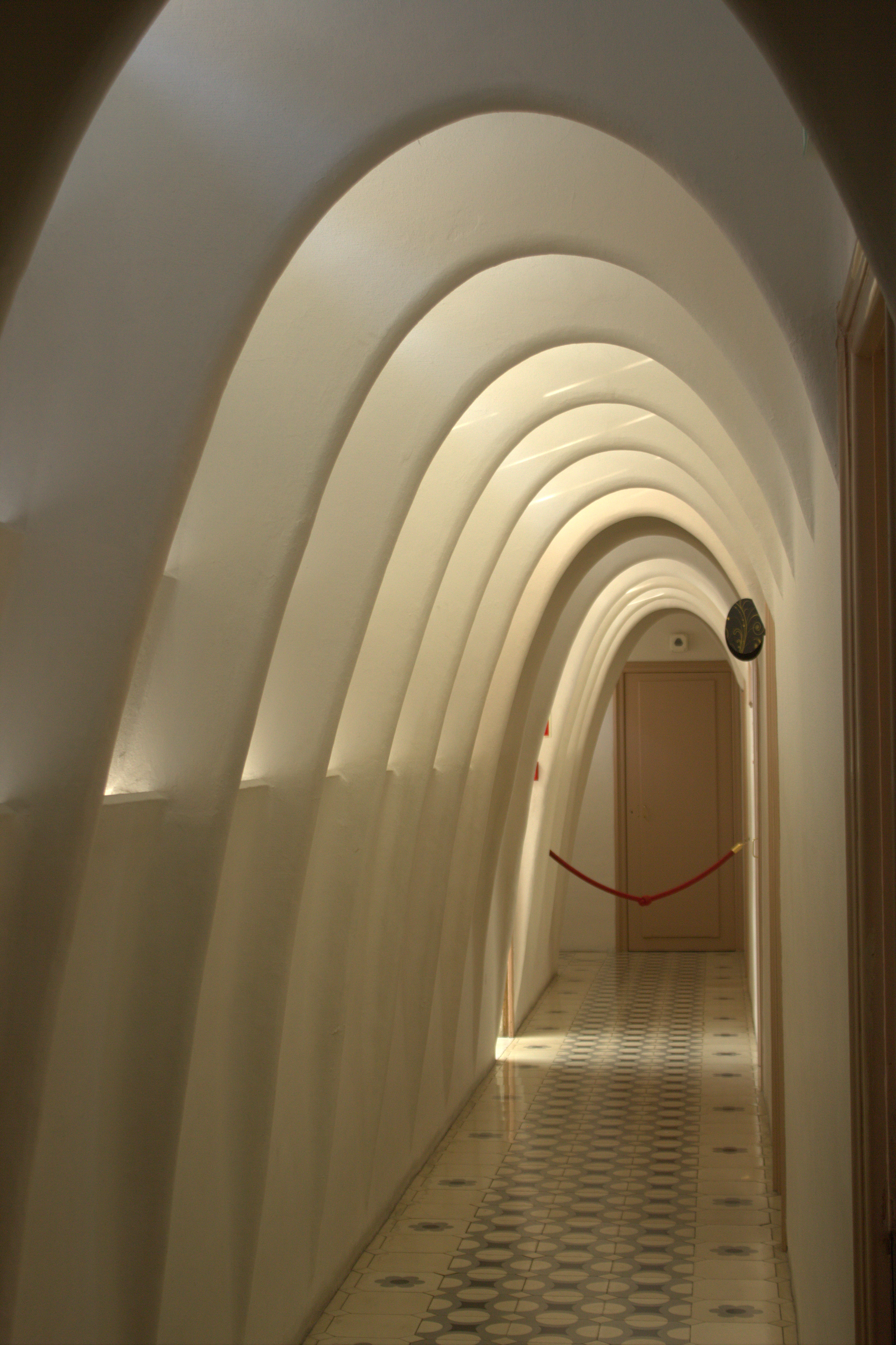
The loft, originally a service area, has sixty catenary arches

The loft is considered to be one of the most unusual spaces. It was formerly a service area for the tenants of the different apartments in the building which contained laundry rooms and storage areas. It is known for its simplicity of shapes and its Mediterranean influence through the use of white on the walls. It contains a series of sixty catenary arches that creates a space which represents the ribcage of an animal. Some people believe that the "ribcage" design of the arches is a ribcage for the dragon's spine that is represented in the roof.

=== The Atrium (light well) ===
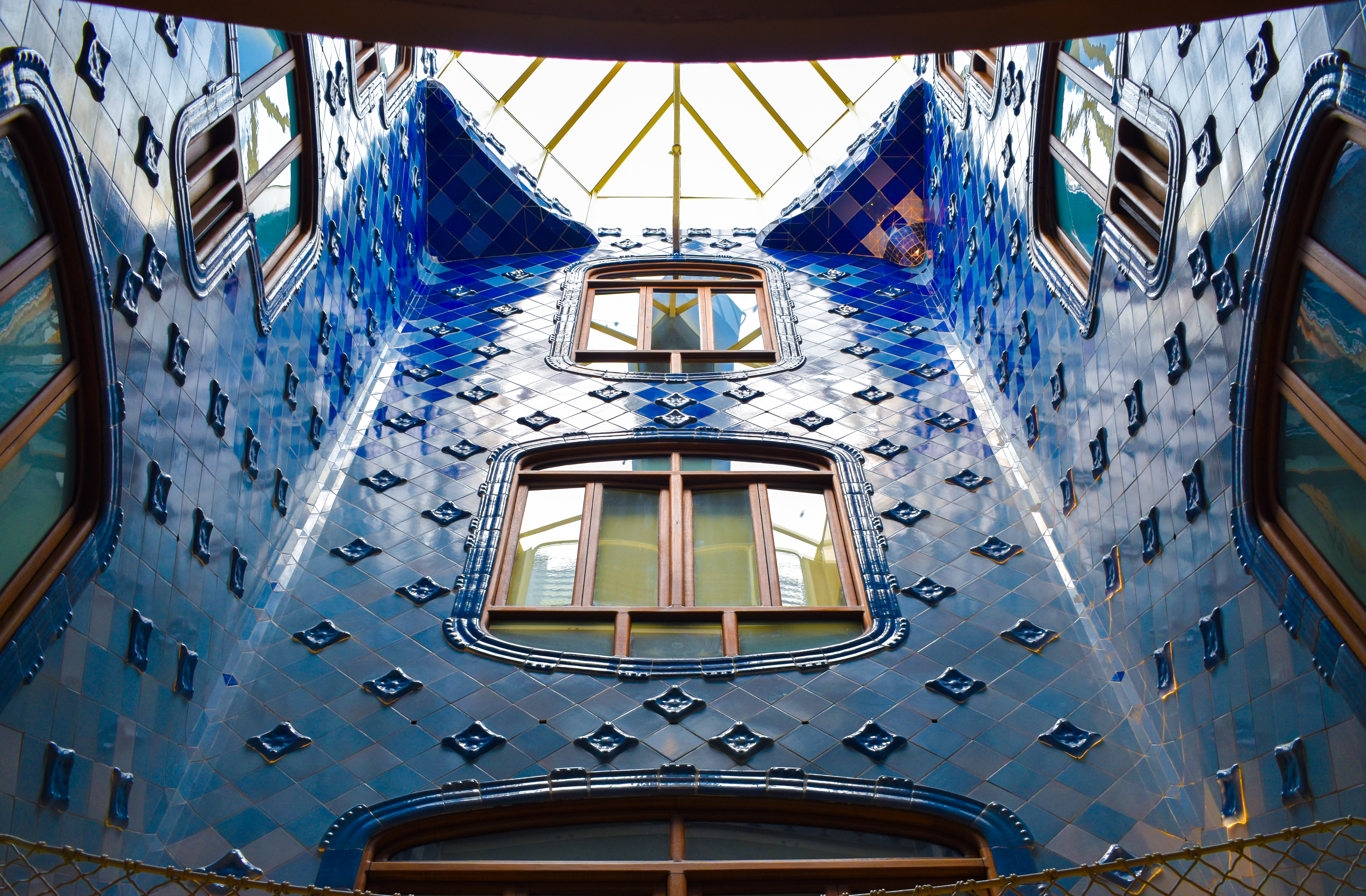
Atrium (light well)

The Atrium or light well is in the central part of the house and delivers natural light to all corners of the house. Gaudí was obsessed with light and how it reflected off certain surfaces. The wall of the atrium is done in different shades of blue and is enhanced by a diamond textile pattern all around the walls. The blue tiles allow an equal distribution of light to all the floors. The well has windows with wooden shutters that permit them to be opened for ventilation or closed. Gaudí "came up with innovations that addressed the ventilation challenges that many buildings were facing at the end of the 1800s," Gary Gautier, director general of Casa Batlló, told the architecture and design magazine Dezeen. "He also created a lot of solutions to light up the rooms where the electricity could not get."

Gaudí wanted to make the bottom of the well feel like the bottom of the sea. The skylight allows light to reflect off the ceramic tiles, into the windows, illuminating the house naturally. The blue tiles are more intensely colored at the top and more opaque toward the bottom of the atrium. The diamond textiles match the rest of the house's use of different, functional shapes.

=== Noble floor and museum ===
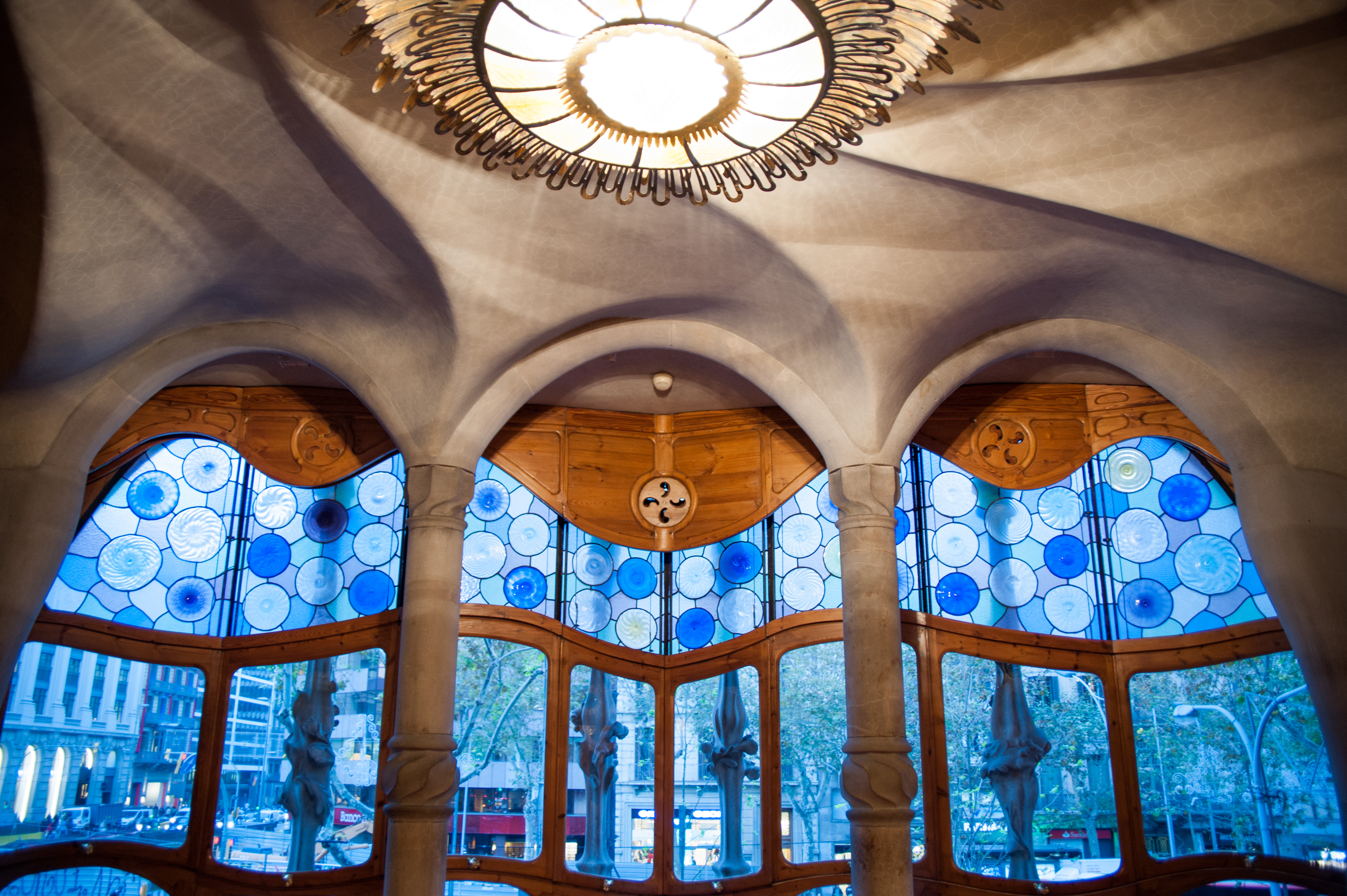
Interior of the Noble Floor, which currently houses a museum open to the public

The noble floor is more than seven-hundred square meters. The main floor of the building, it is accessed through a private entrance hall with skylights resembling tortoise shells and vaulted walls in curving shapes. There is a spacious landing with direct views of the blue tiling of the building well. On the Passeig de Gracia side is Batlló's study, a dining room, and a secluded spot for courting couples, notable for its mushroom-shaped fireplace. The elaborate and animal-like décor continues throughout the entire floor.

In 2002, as part of the celebration of the International Year of Gaudí, the house opened its doors to the public and people were allowed to visit the noble floor. Casa Batlló proved immensely popular, and visitors were eager to see the rest of the house. Two years later, in celebration of the one hundredth anniversary of the beginning of work on Casa Batlló, the fifth floor was restored and the house extended public access to the loft and the well. In 2005, Casa Batlló was designated a UNESCO World Heritage Site.

=== Roof ===
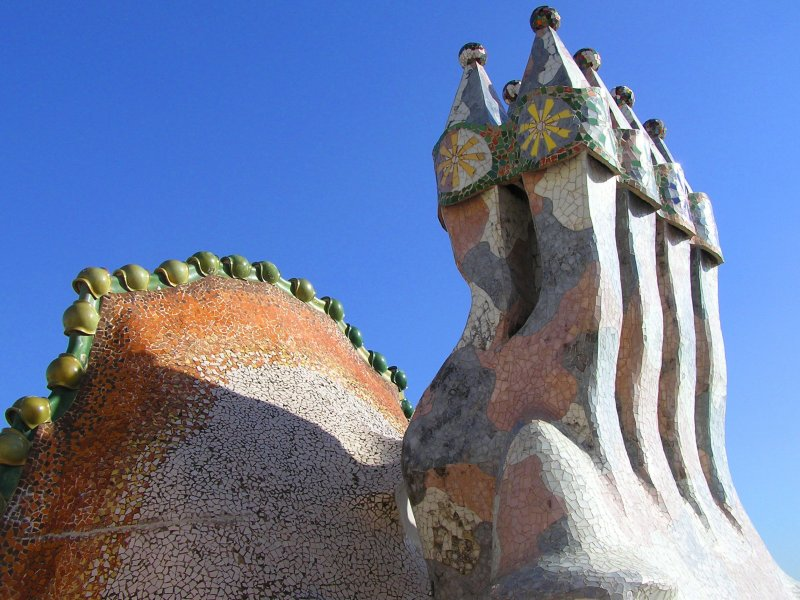
Four chimney stacks on the roof, with the dragon's spine roof arch behind

The roof terrace is one of the most popular features of the entire house due to its famous dragon back design. Gaudí represents an animal's spine by using tiles of different colors on one side. The roof is decorated with four chimney stacks designed to prevent backdraughts.

=== Exterior façade ===
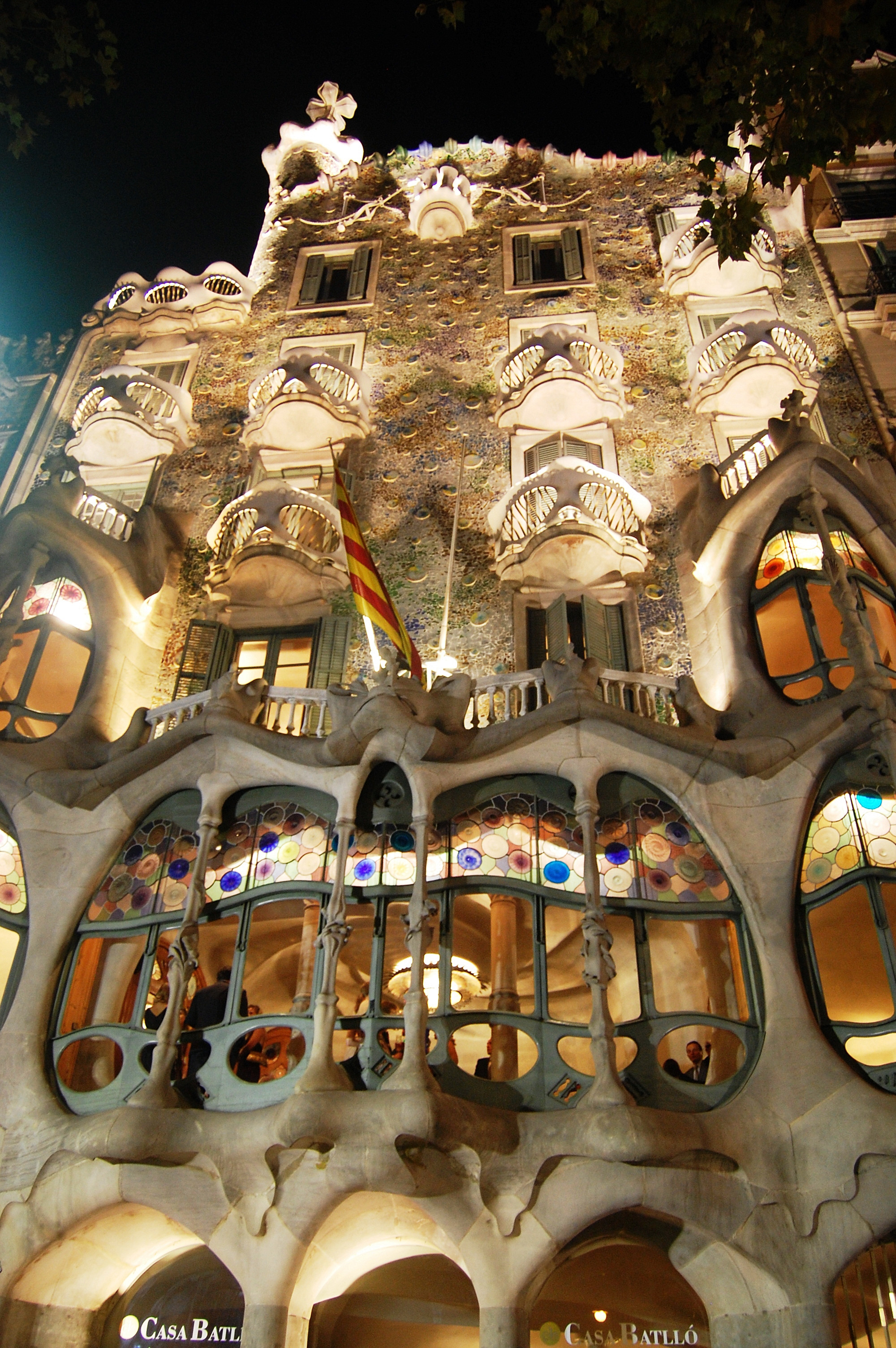
The façade has three distinct sections.

The façade has three distinct sections which are harmoniously integrated. The lower ground floor with the main floor and two first-floor galleries are contained in a structure of Montjuïc sandstone with undulating lines. The central part, which reaches the last floor, is a multicolored section with protruding balconies. The top of the building is a crown, like a huge gable, which is at the same level as the roof and helps to conceal the room where there used to be water tanks. This room is currently empty. The top displays a trim with ceramic pieces that has attracted multiple interpretations.

Gomez-Moriana singles out Gaudí's use of trencadís, which repurposes "upcycled scrap materials and byproducts from industry," as an example of an eco-political awareness that was far in advance of his time. "The trencadís mosaics made from broken tile shards" on "the façade of Casa Batlló were collected from the dumpsters of other construction sites," notes Gomez-Moriana, in "Gaudí, Ecologist," an article for his blog Criticalista. "Indeed, Casa Batlló itself is a refurbishment of a pre-existing building that the client originally insisted on demolishing. Gaudí convinced Batlló not to replace his house with a new one, arguing it was wiser to transform it instead. This was an entire century before Lacaton & Vassal's 'Never Demolish' manifesto."

==== Roof tile ====
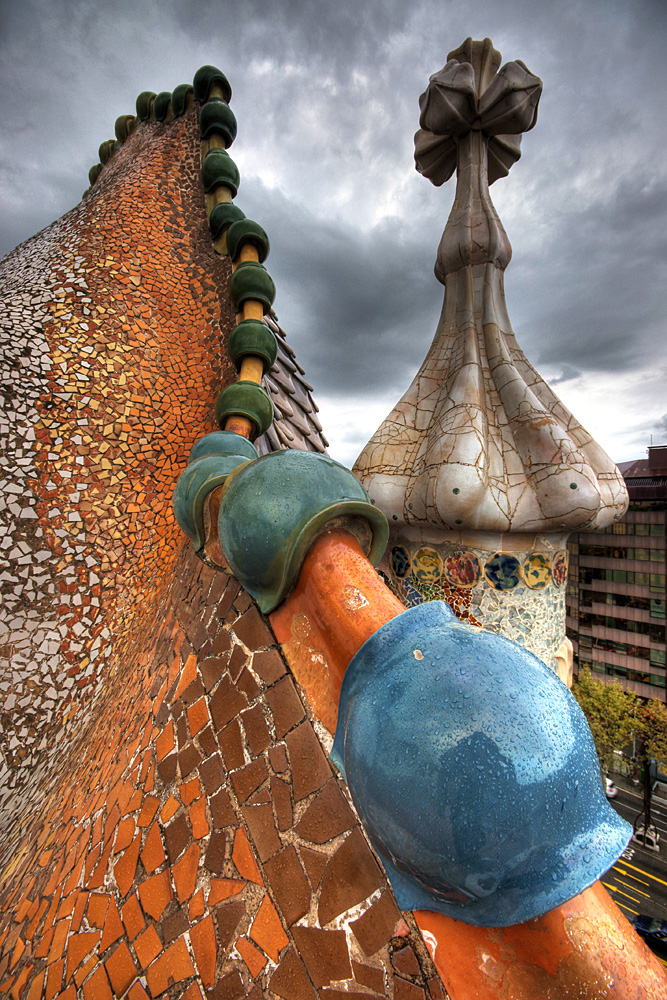
Roof architecture and ceramic tiles, with tower and bulb in the background

The roof's arched profile recalls the spine of a dragon with ceramic tiles for scales; a small triangular window towards the right of the structure simulates the eye. As of 2022, a partial view of the Sagrada Família can be seen from this vantage point, with its spires visible over newer buildings. The tiles were given a metallic sheen to simulate the varying scales of the monster, with the color grading from green on the right side, where the head begins, to deep blue and violet in the center, to red and pink on the left side of the building.

==== Tower and bulb ====
One of the highlights of the façade is a tower topped with a cross whose four arms are oriented to the cardinal directions. It is a bulbous, root-like structure that evokes plant life. There is a second bulb-shaped structure similarly reminiscent of a thalamus (in the botanical, not the neuroanatomical sense), which is represented by a cross whose arms are buds announcing the next flowering. The tower is decorated with monograms of Jesus (JHS), Maria (M with the ducal crown) and Joseph (JHP) made of ceramic pieces that stand out in gold against the green background that covers the façade. These symbols evince the profound religiosity of Gaudí, who was inspired by the contemporaneous construction of his basilica to choose the theme of the holy family.

The bulb was broken when it was delivered. Gaudí liked the aesthetic of the broken masonry and asked that the pieces be stuck to the main structure with lime mortar and held in place with a brass ring.

==== Central section ====
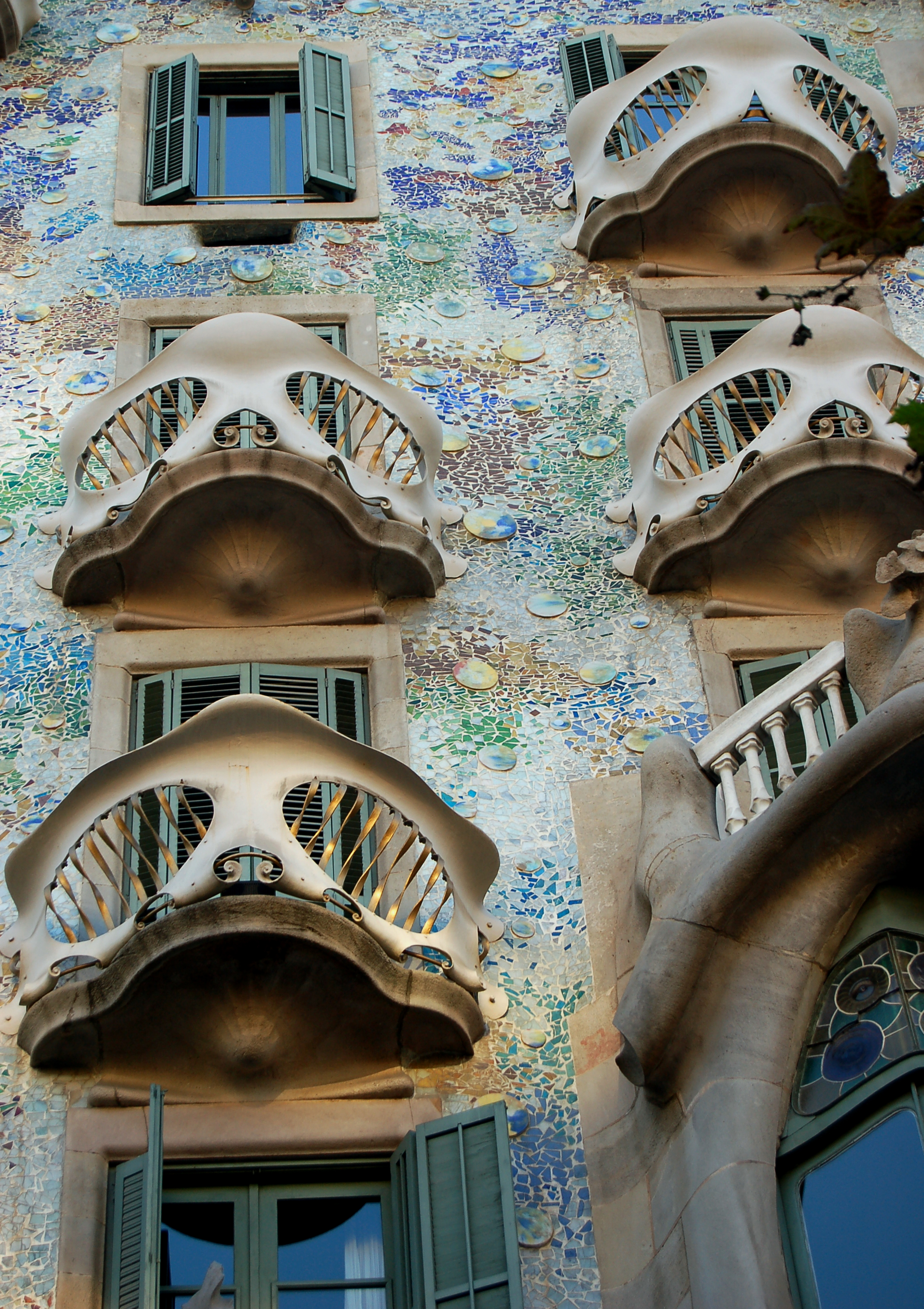
The central part of the façade evokes the surface of a lake with water lilies.

The central part of the façade evokes the surface of a lake with water lilies, reminiscent of Monet's Nymphéas, with gentle ripples and reflections caused by the glass and ceramic mosaic. It is a great undulating surface covered with plaster fragments of colored glass discs combined with 330 rounds of polychrome pottery. The discs were designed by Gaudí and Jujol between tests during their stay in Majorca, while working on the restoration of the Cathedral of Palma.

==== Balcony ====
Finally, above the central part of the façade is a smaller balcony, also iron, with a different exterior aesthetic, closer to a local type of lily. Two iron arms were installed here to support a pulley to raise and lower furniture.

==== Main floor ====
The façade of the main floor, made entirely of sandstone, is supported by two columns. The design is complemented by joinery windows set with multicolored stained glass. In front of the large windows, as if they were pillars supporting the complex stone structure, are six fine columns that seem to simulate the bones of a limb, with an apparent central articulation; in fact, this is a floral decoration. The rounded shapes of the gaps and the lip-like edges carved into the stone surrounding them create a semblance of a fully open mouth, for which the Casa Batlló has been nicknamed the "house of yawns." The structure repeats on the first floor and in the design of two windows at the ends forming galleries, but on the large central window there are two balconies as described above.

== Gallery ==
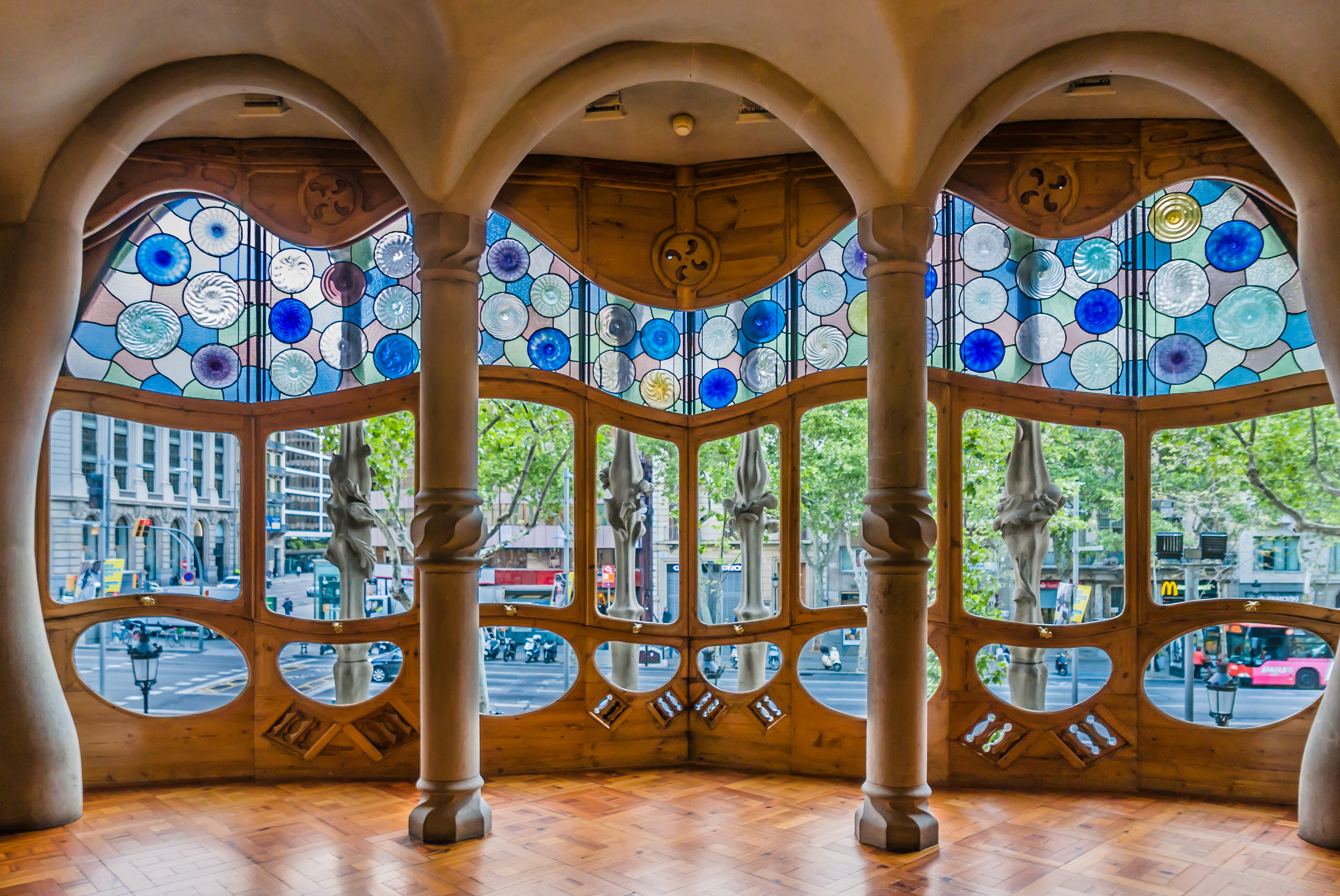
Stained glass noblefloor of Casa Batlló

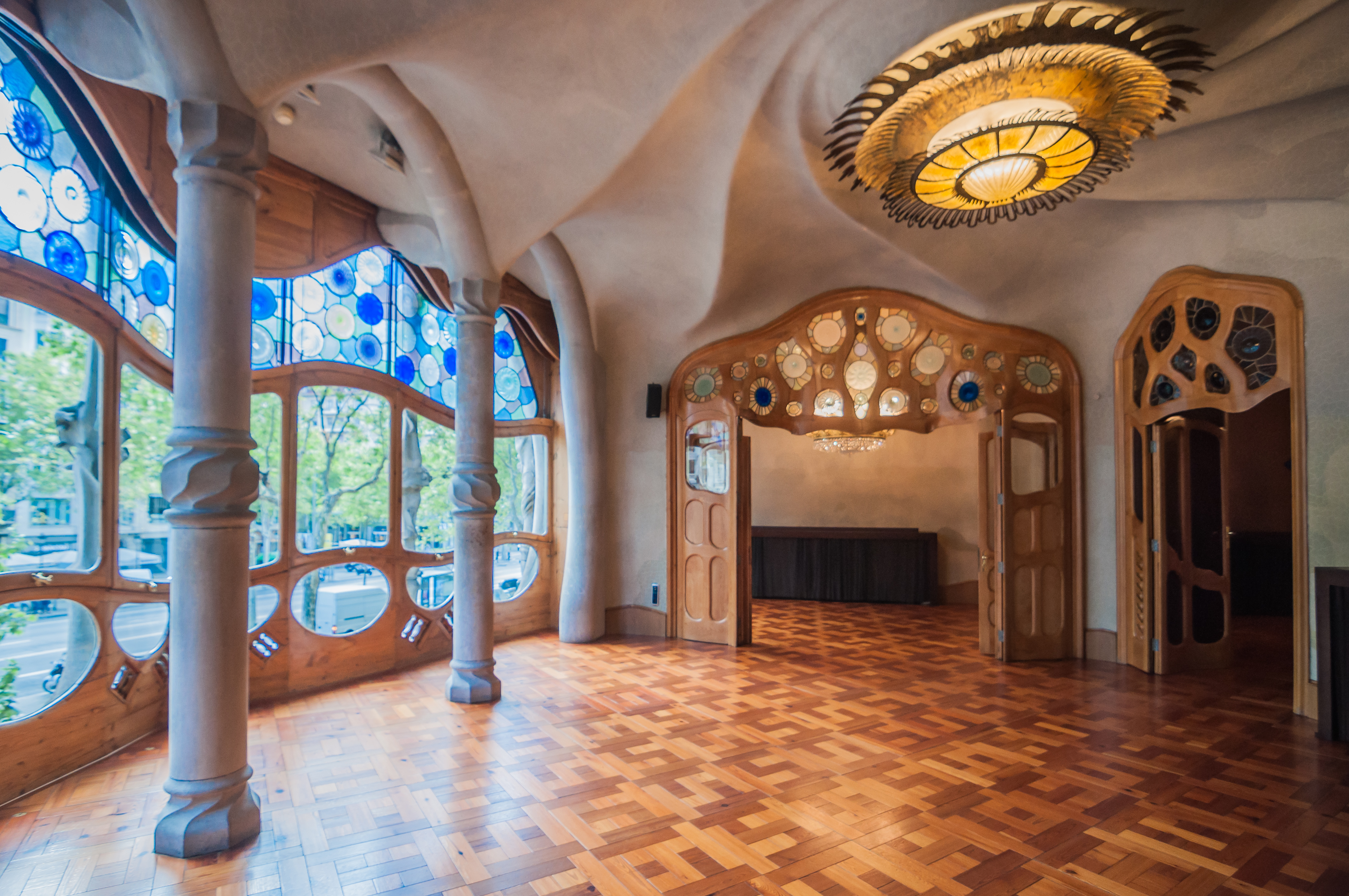
Noblefloor of Casa Batlló

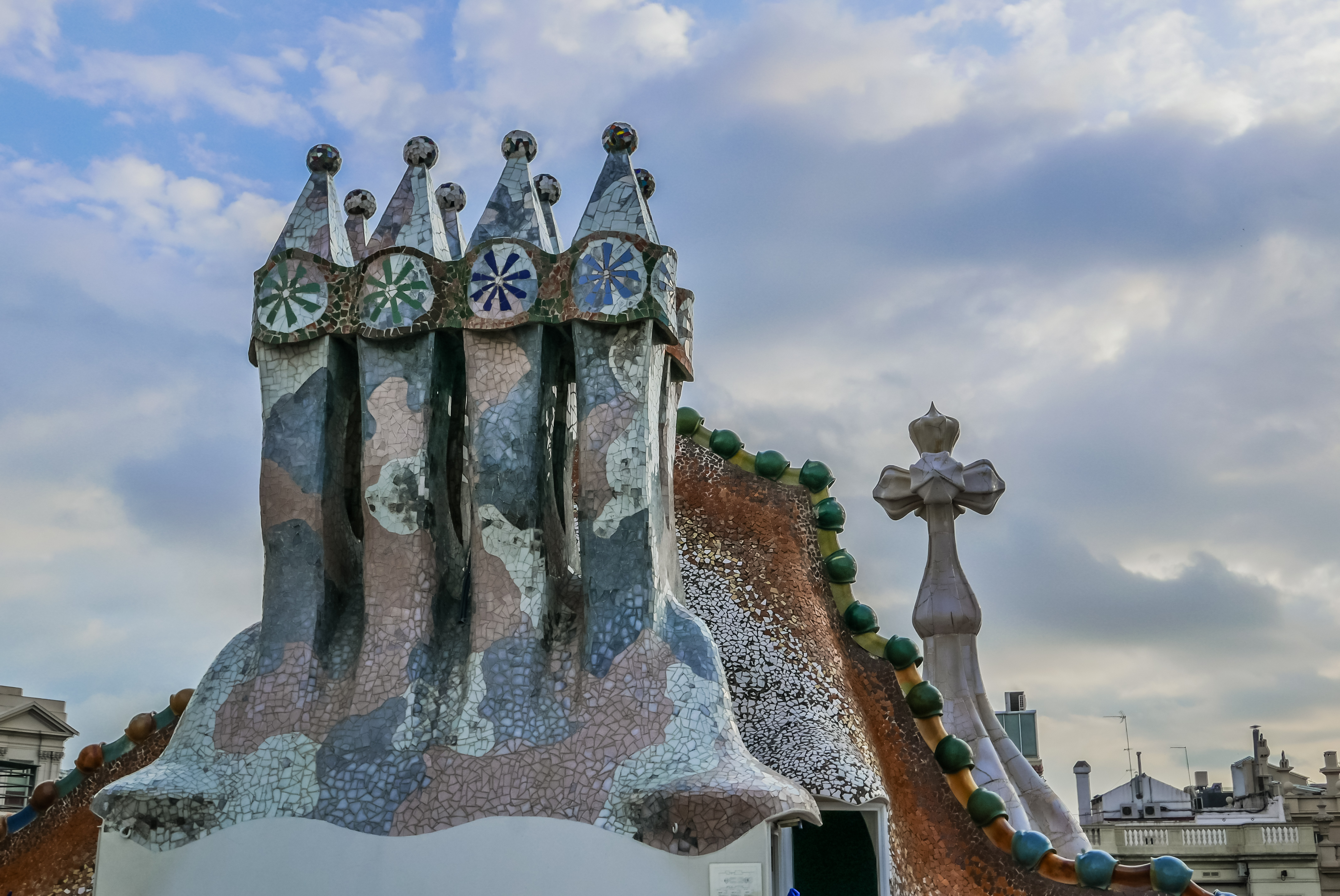
Chimneys of Casa Batlló

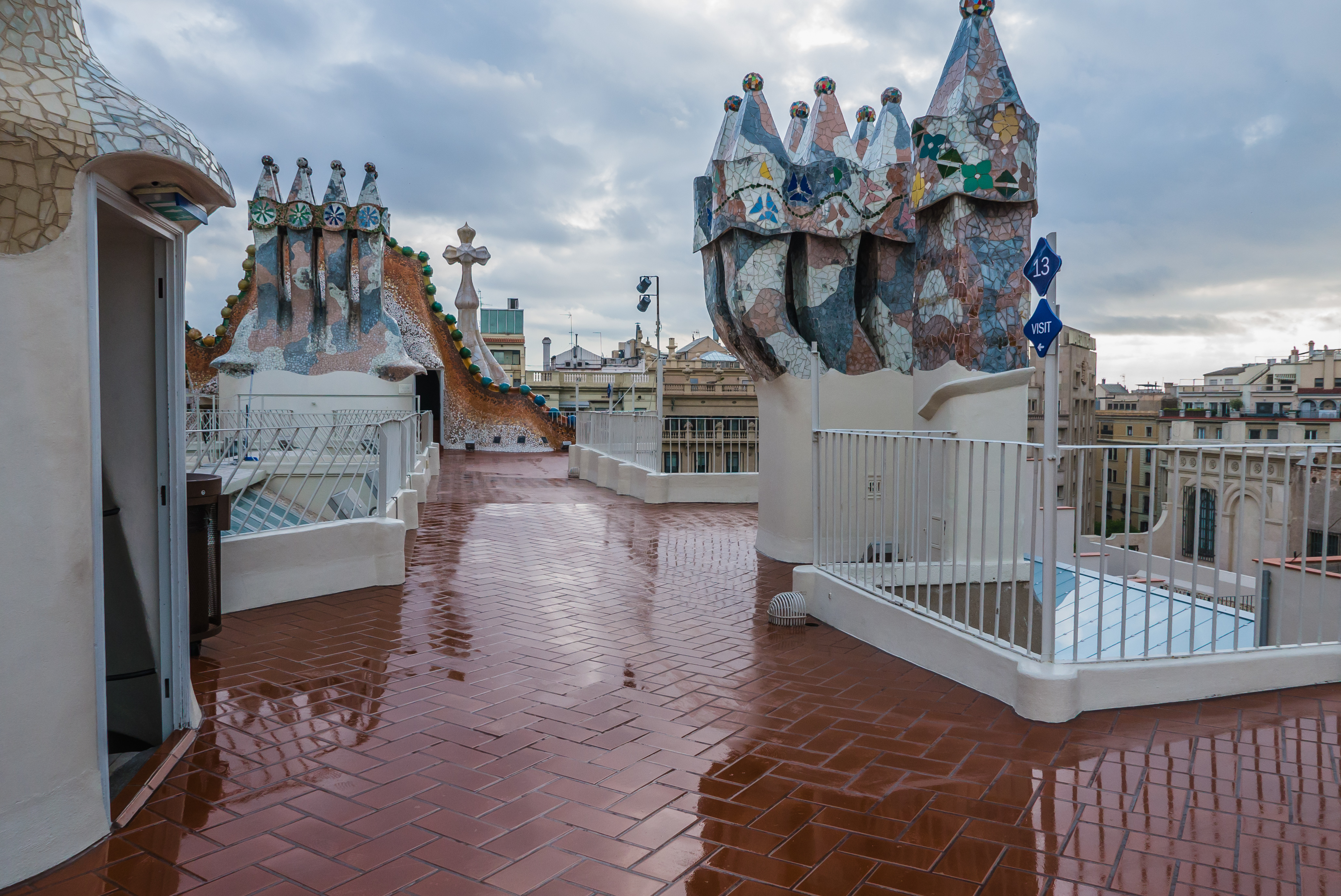
Rooftop of Casa Batlló

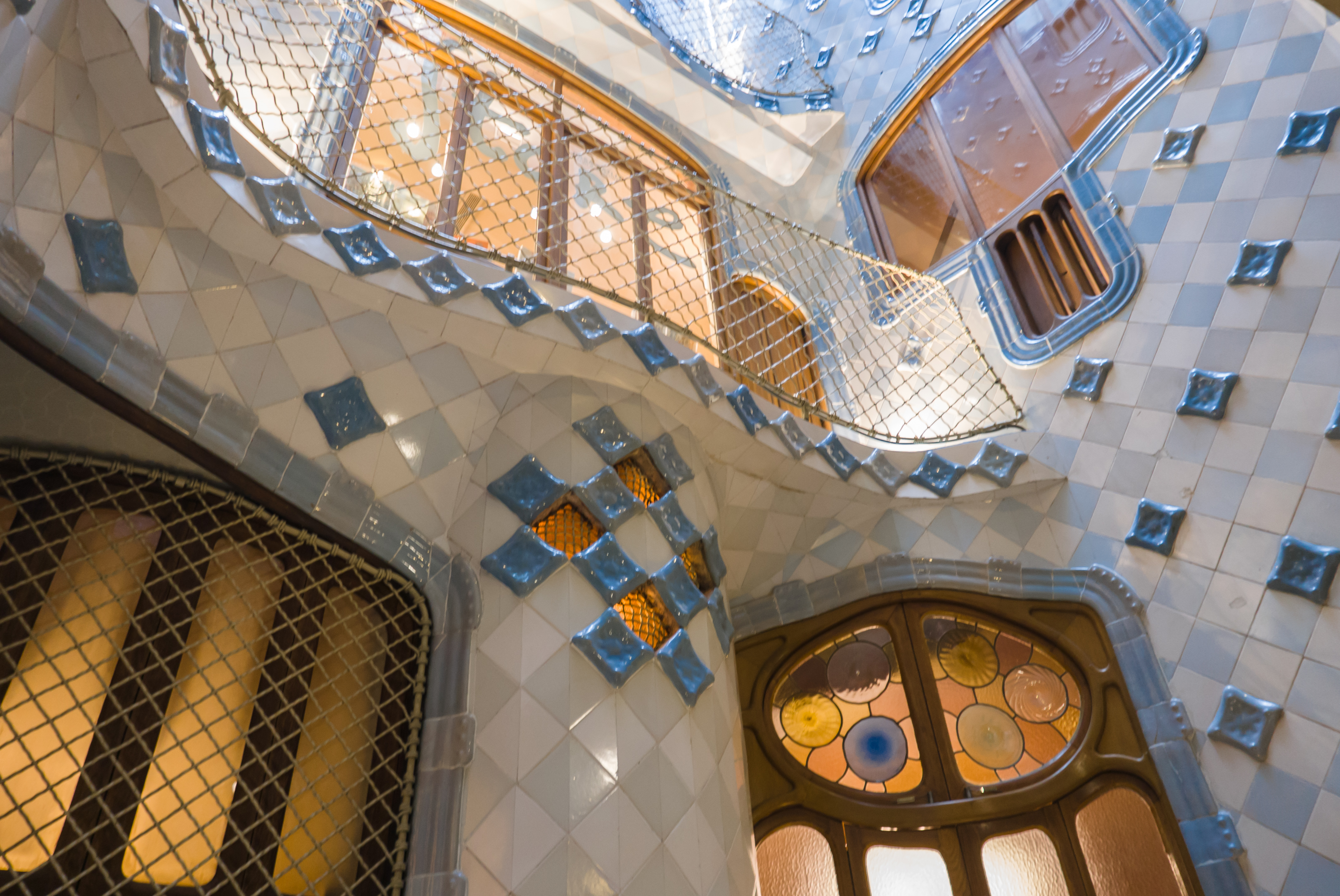
Inner lightwell of Casa Batlló

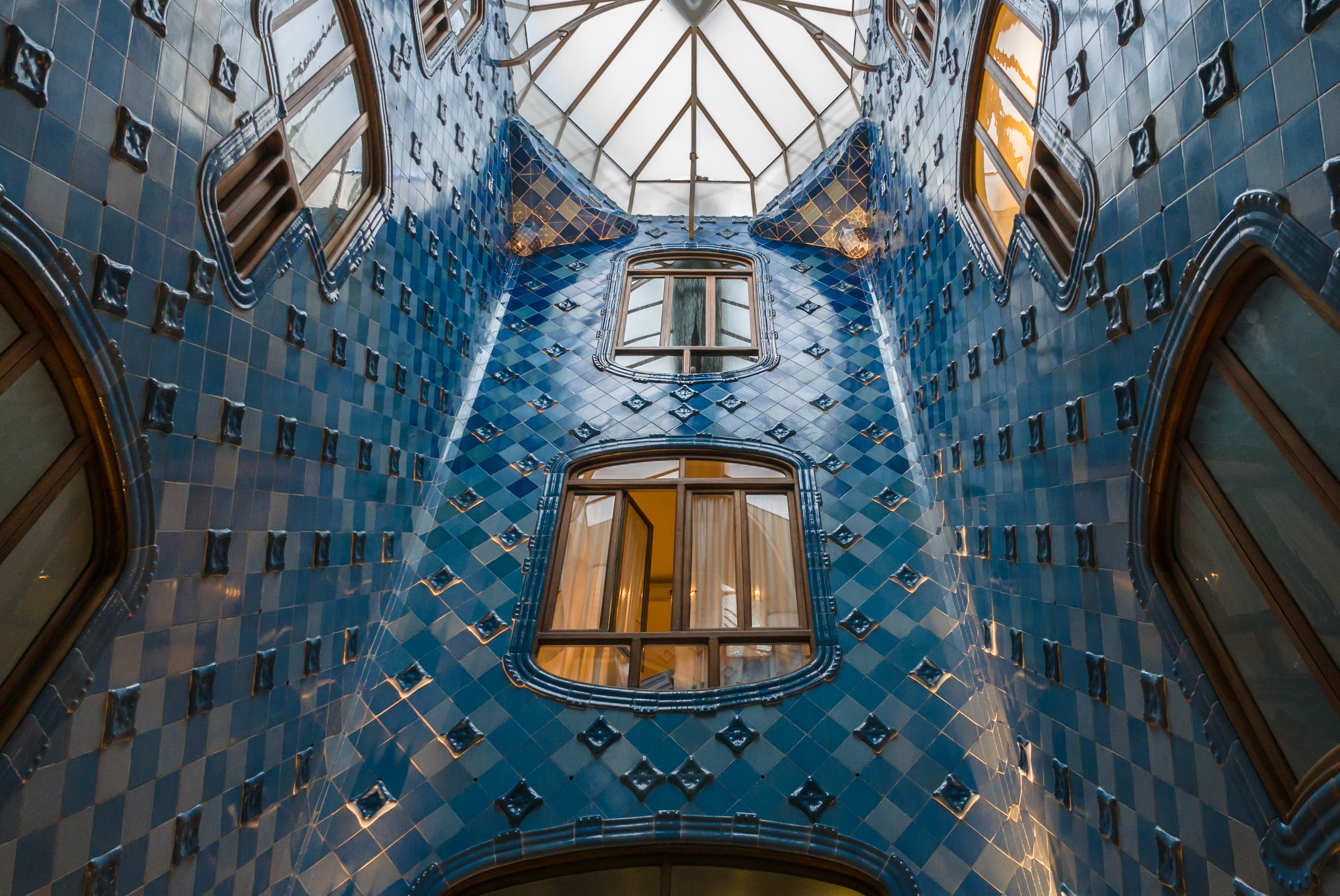
Blue lightwell of Casa Batlló

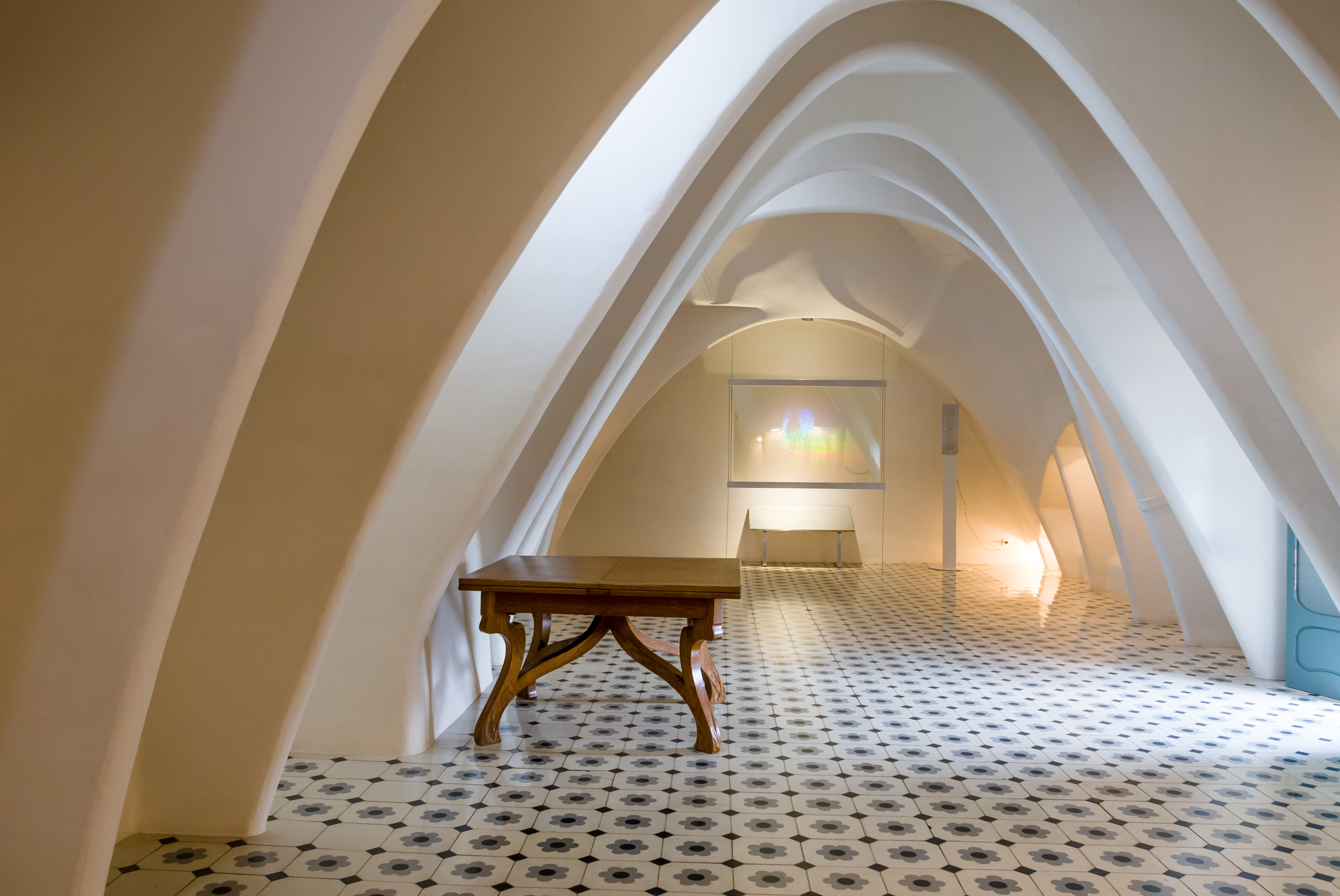
Catenary arcs of Casa Batlló

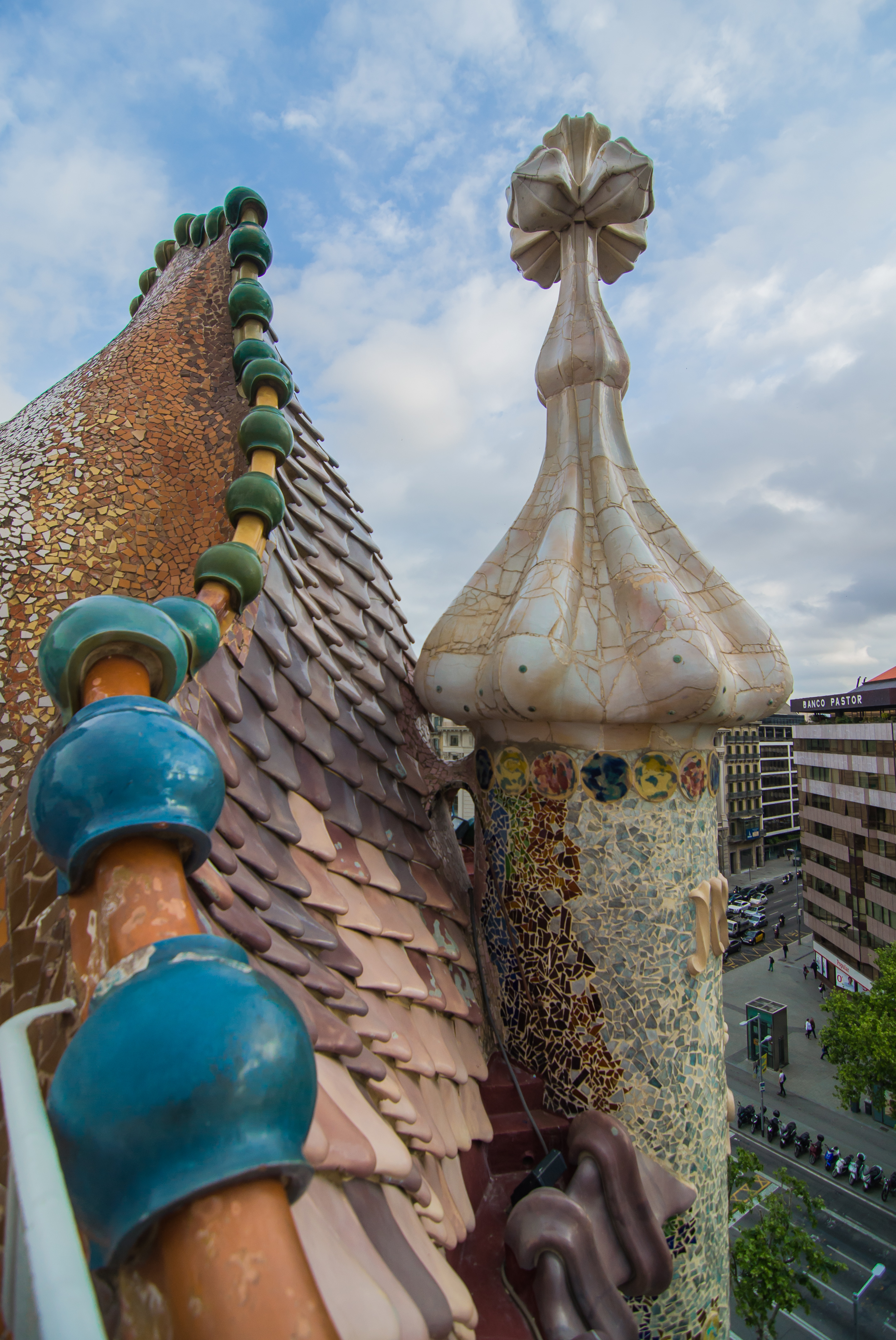
Dragon roof of Casa Batlló

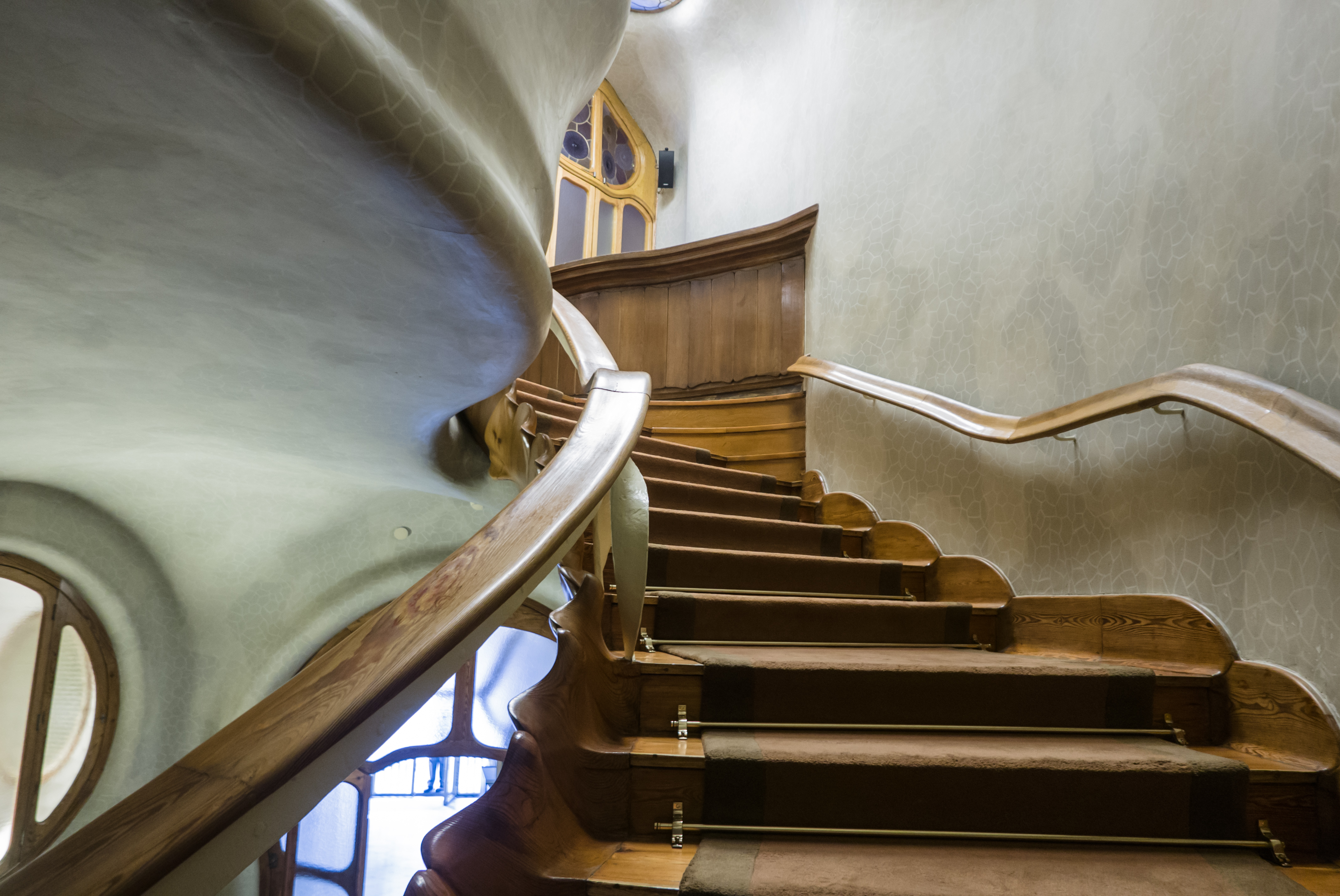
Dragon stairs of Casa Batlló

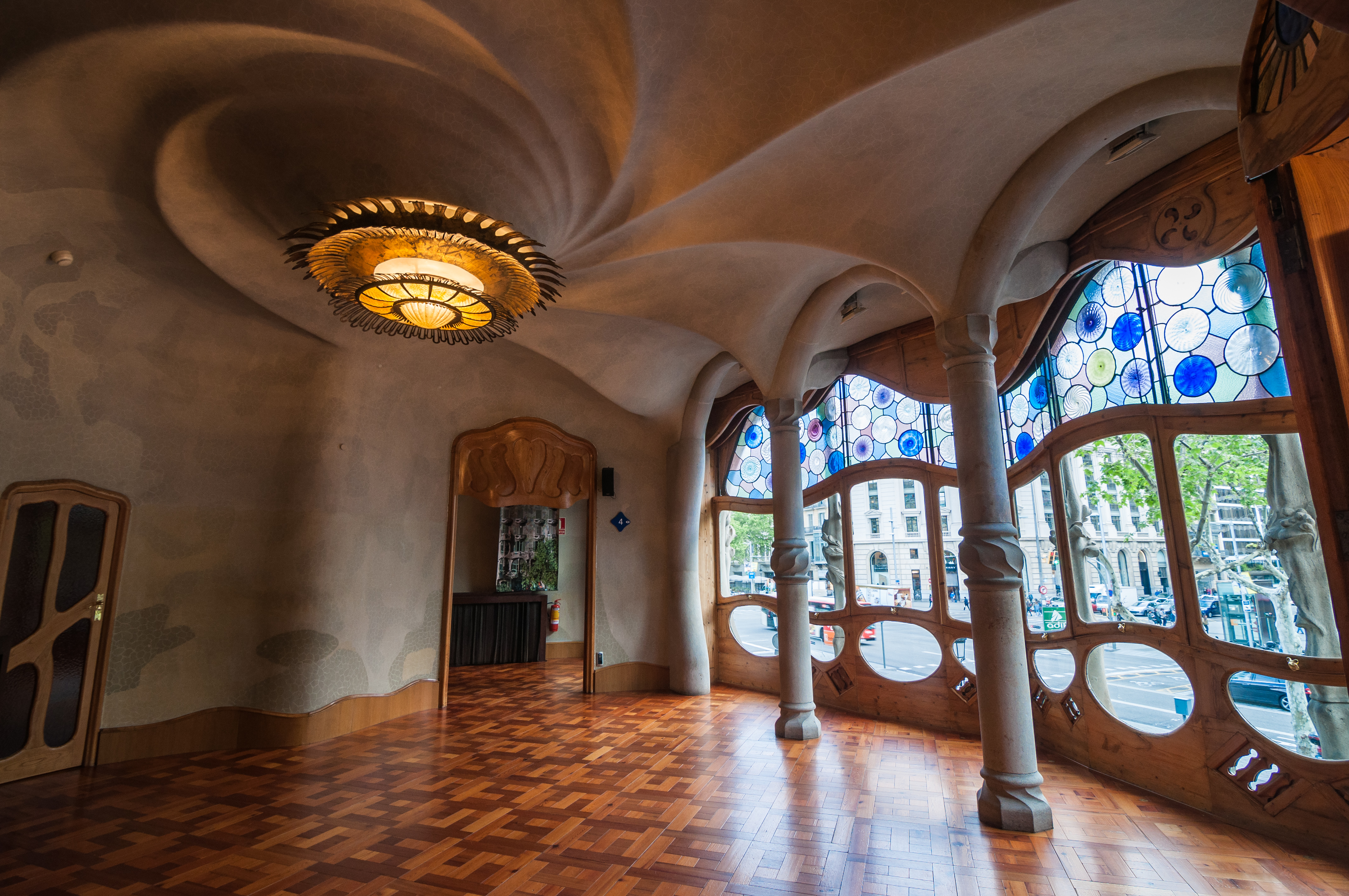
Saloon noble floor of Casa Batlló

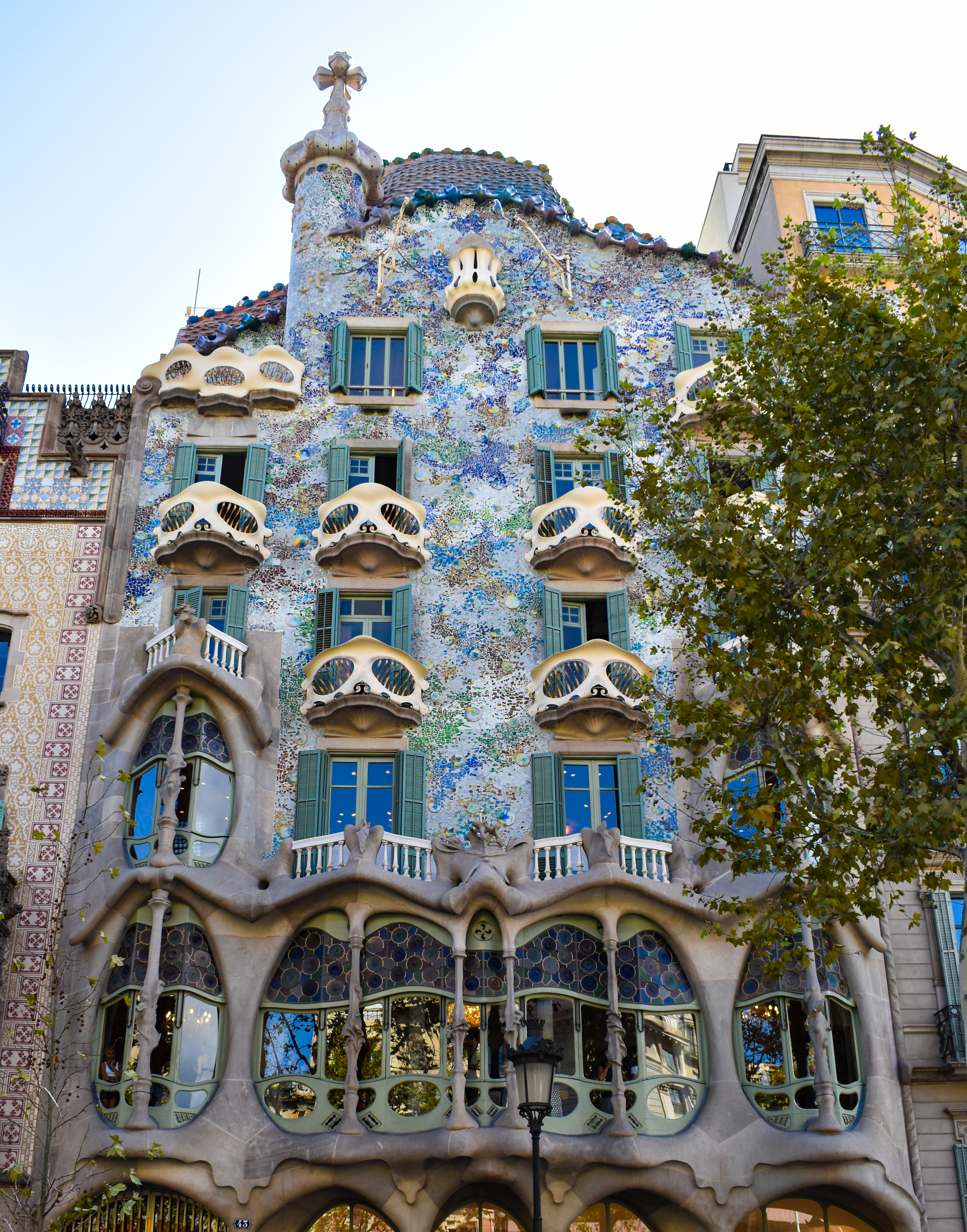
Façade of Casa Batlló

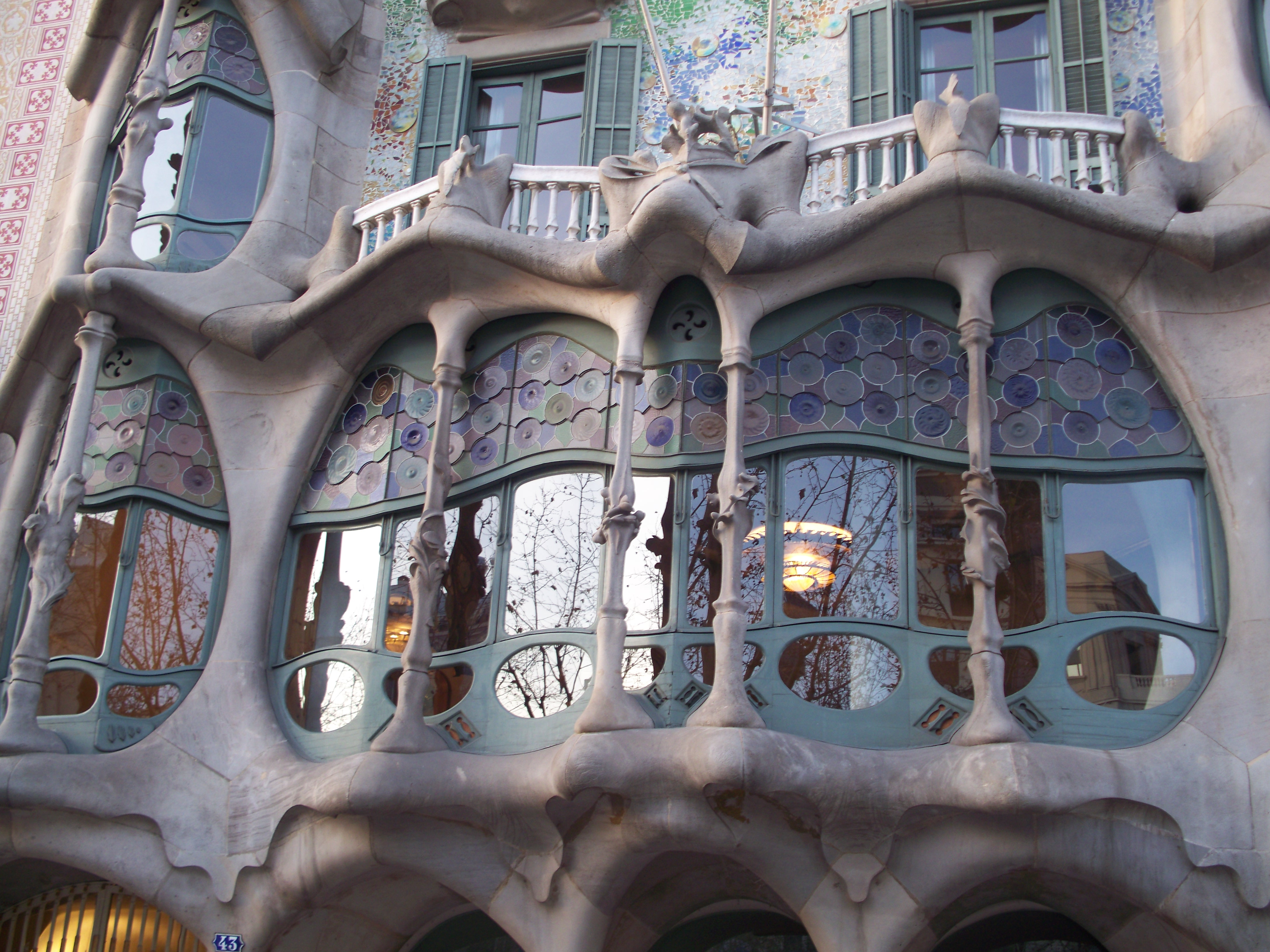
Façade close-up

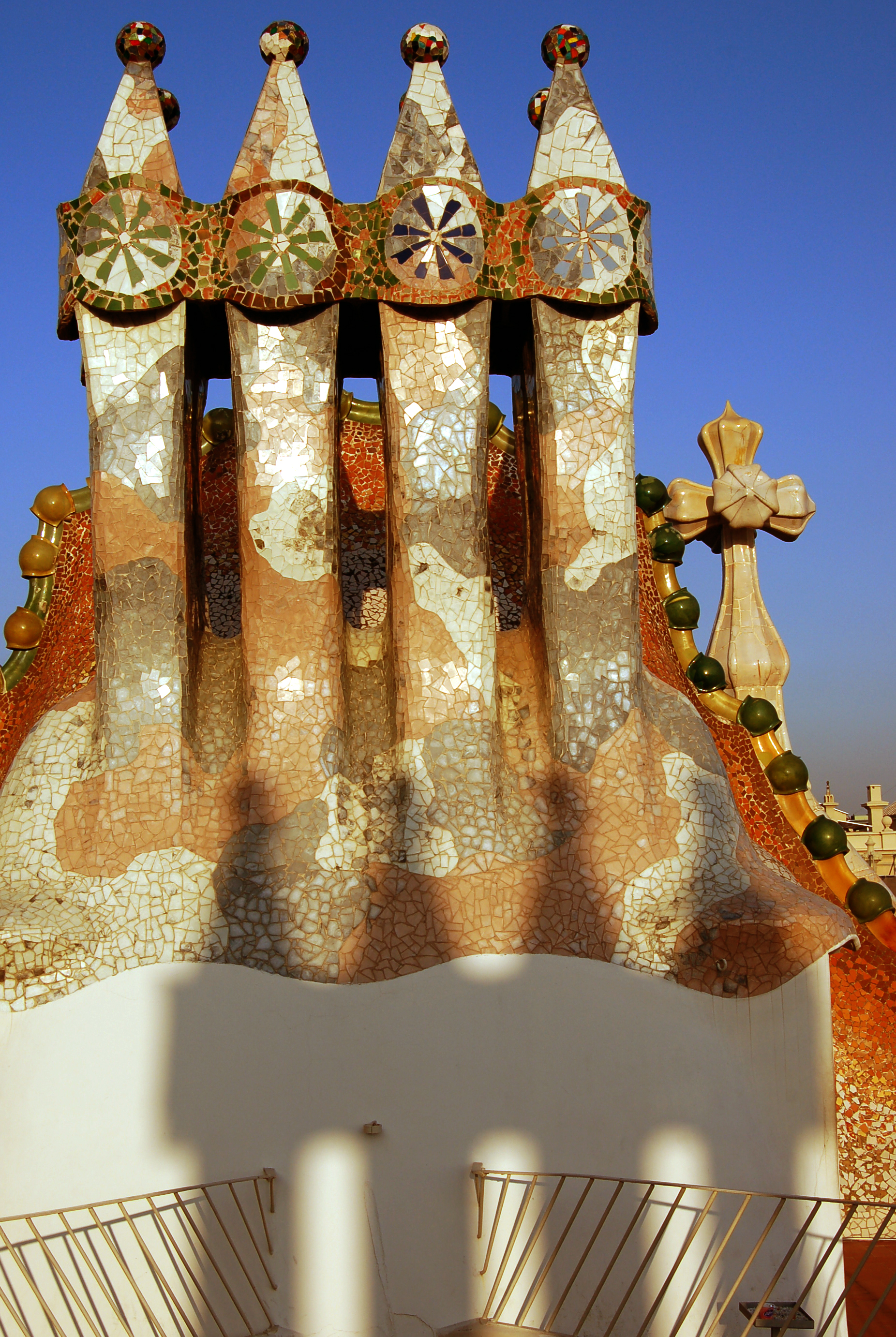
Close-up of a chimney

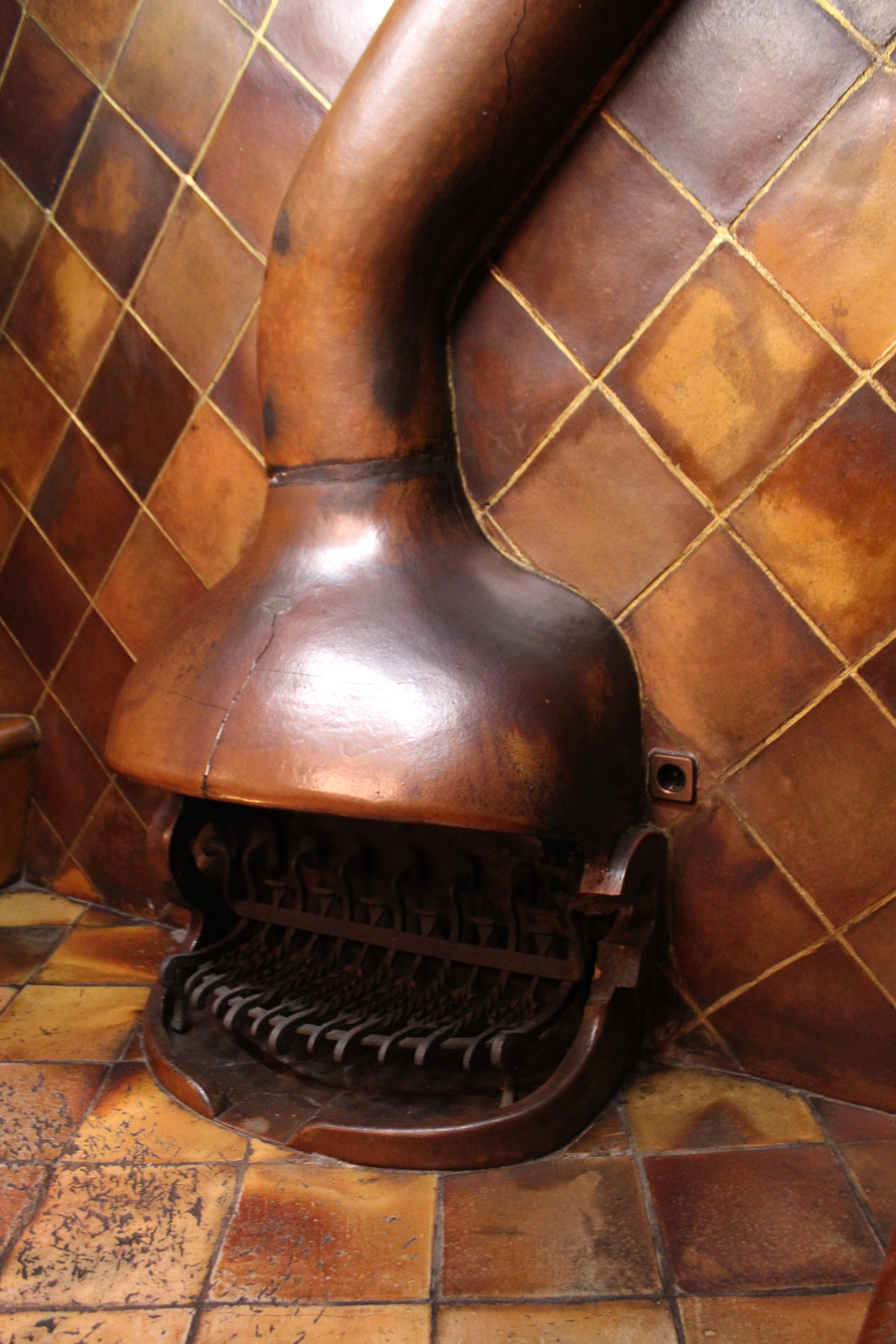
Casa Batlló fireplace

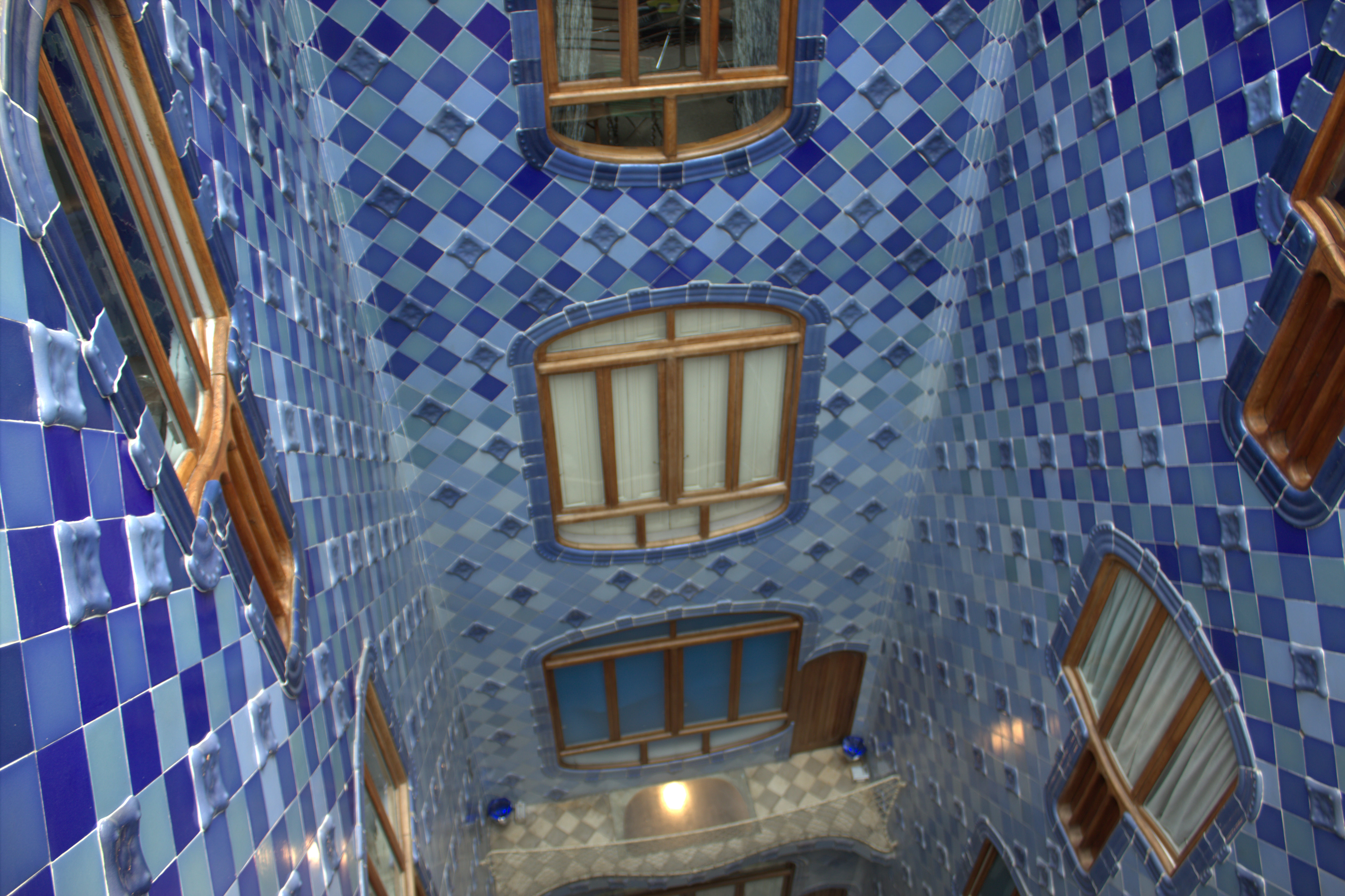
Casa Batlló central light well

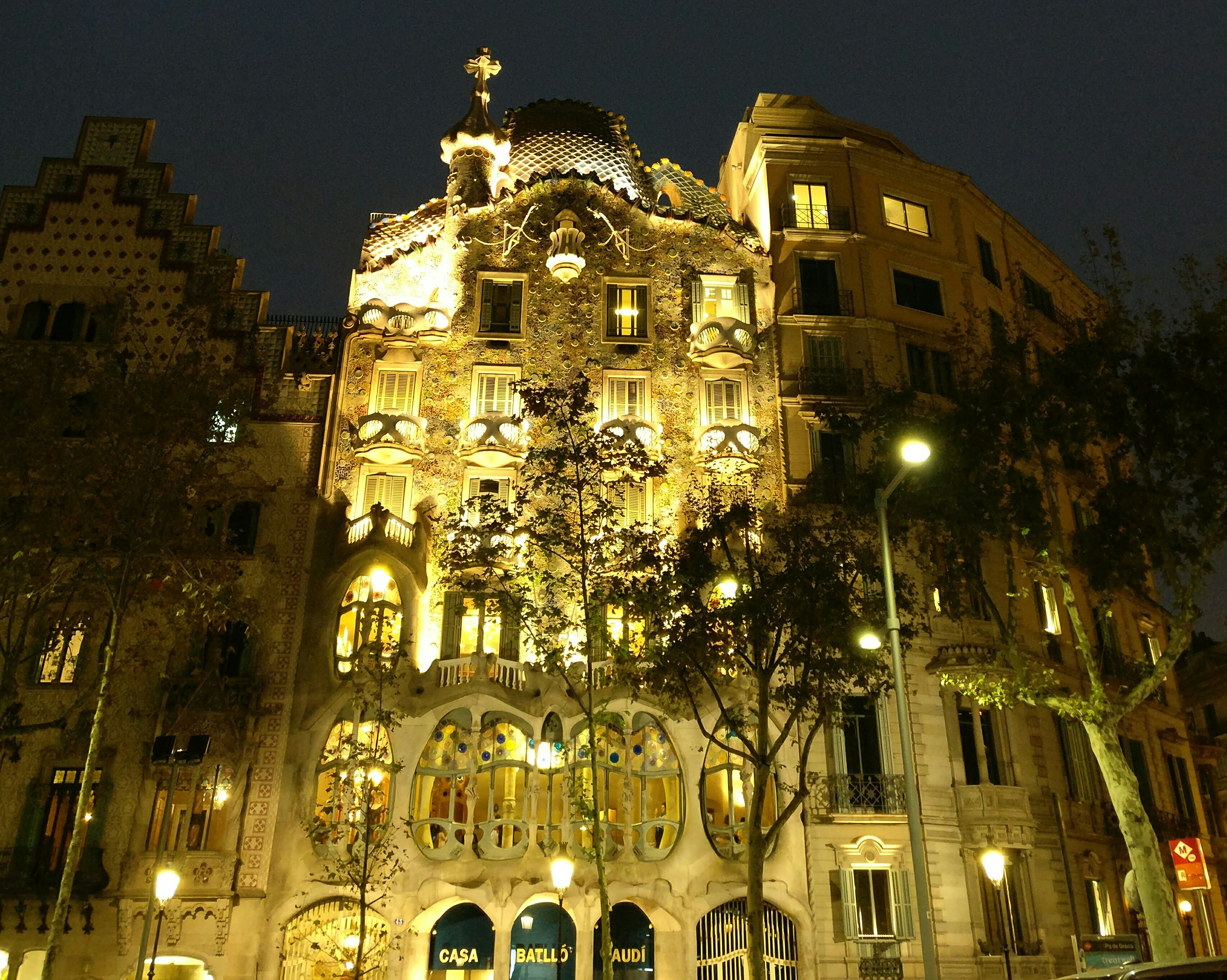
Casa Batlló - Night View

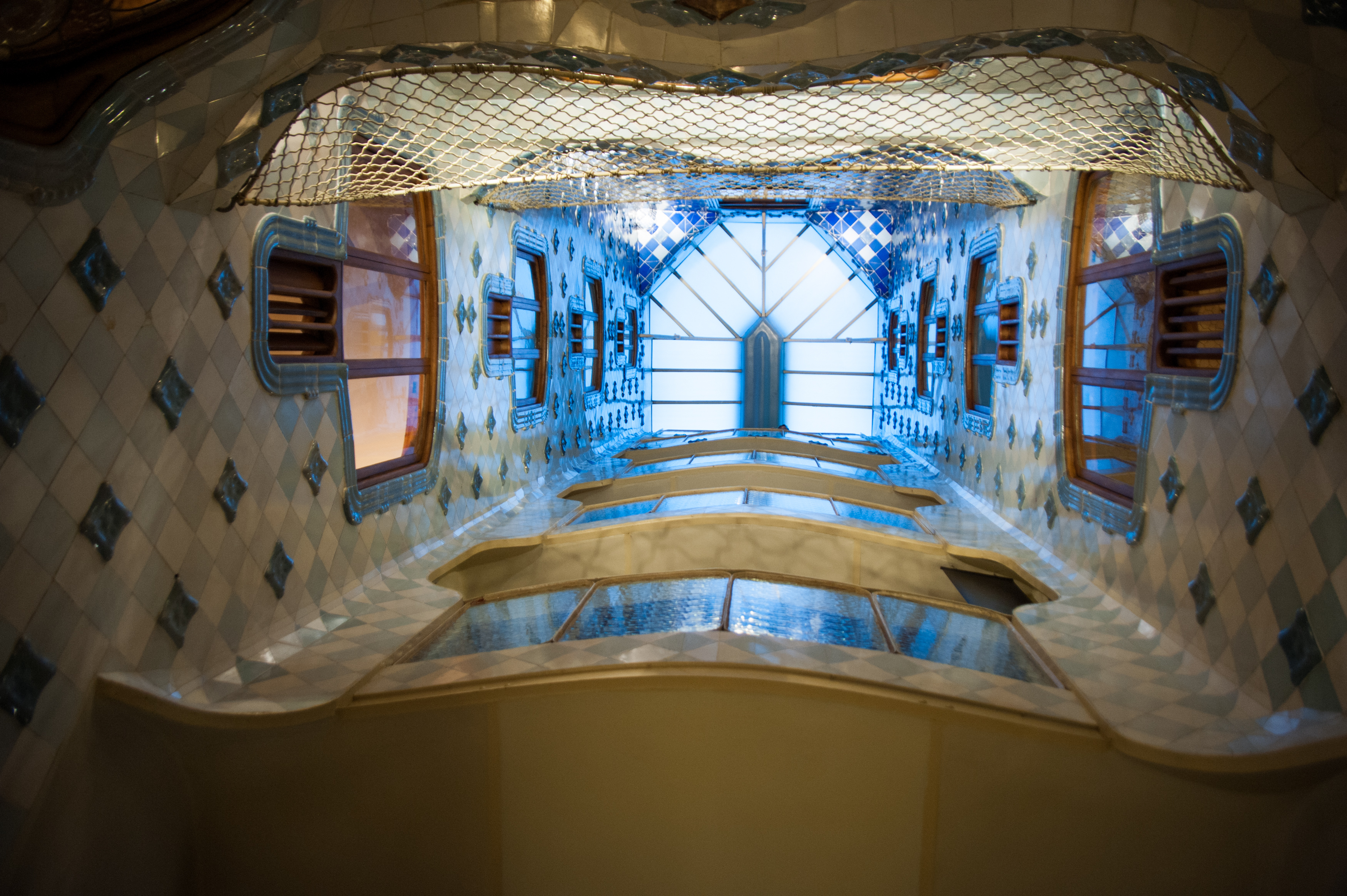
Atrium of Casa Batlló

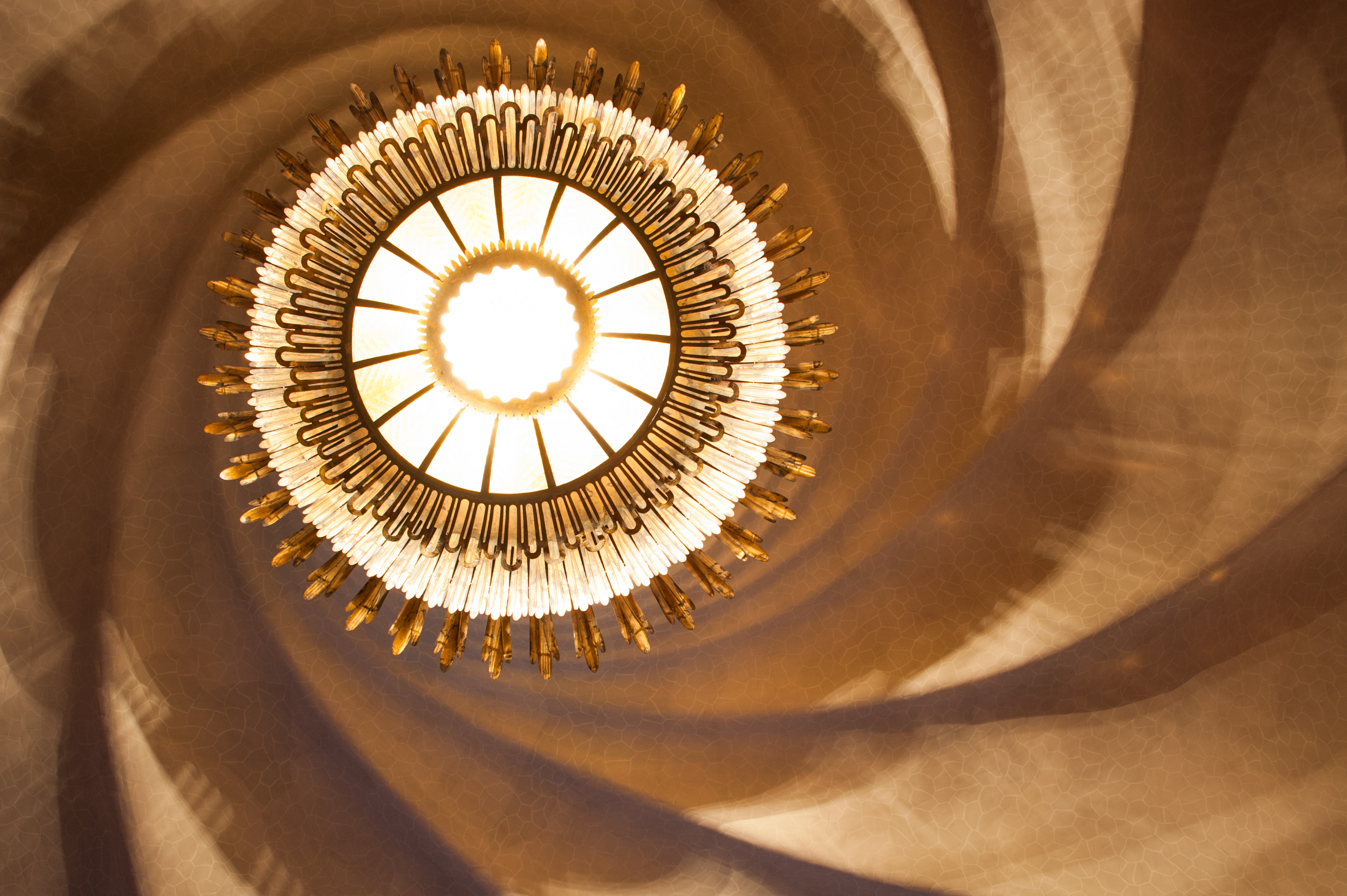
Ceiling close-up

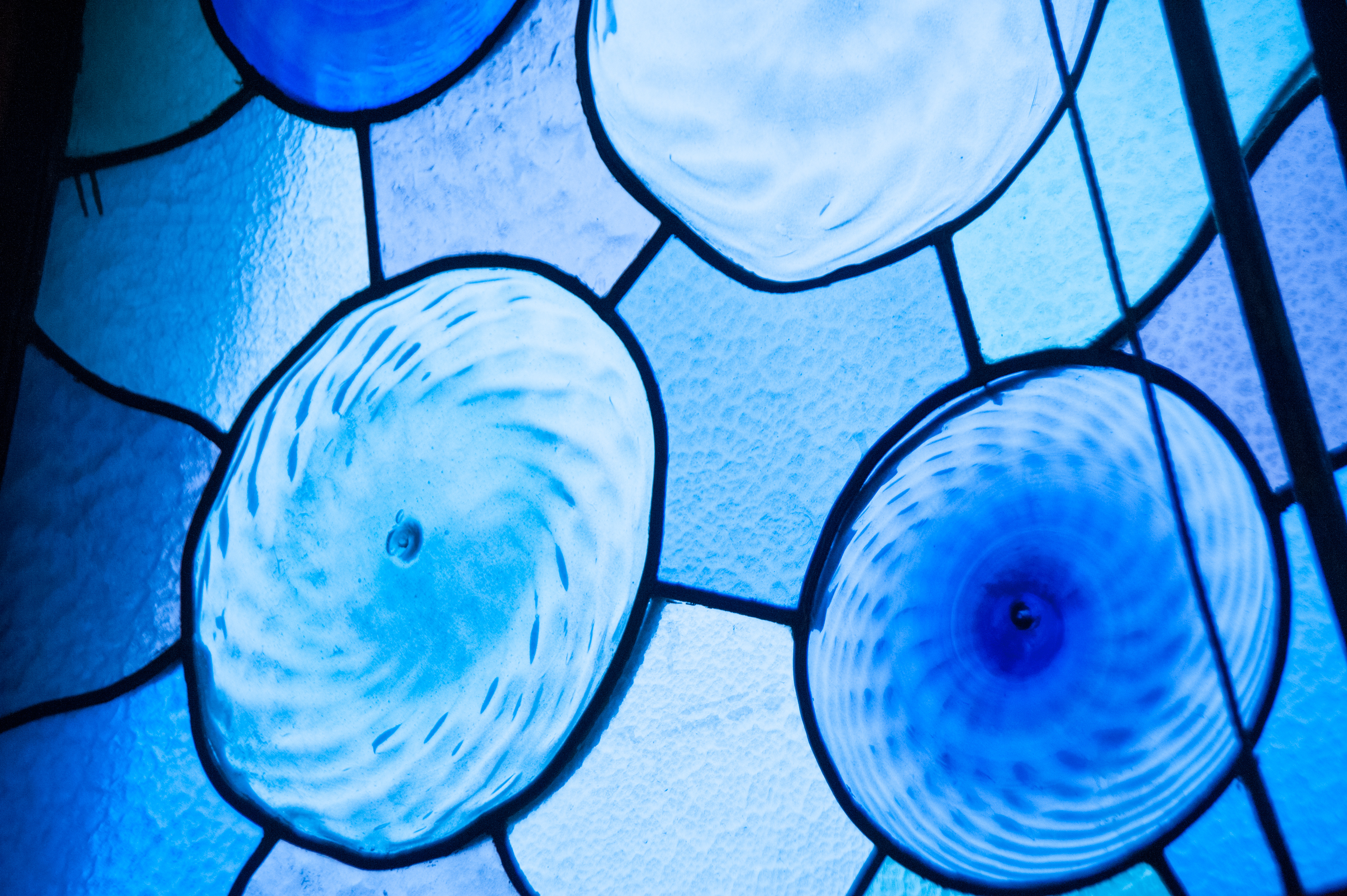
Stained-glass window close-up

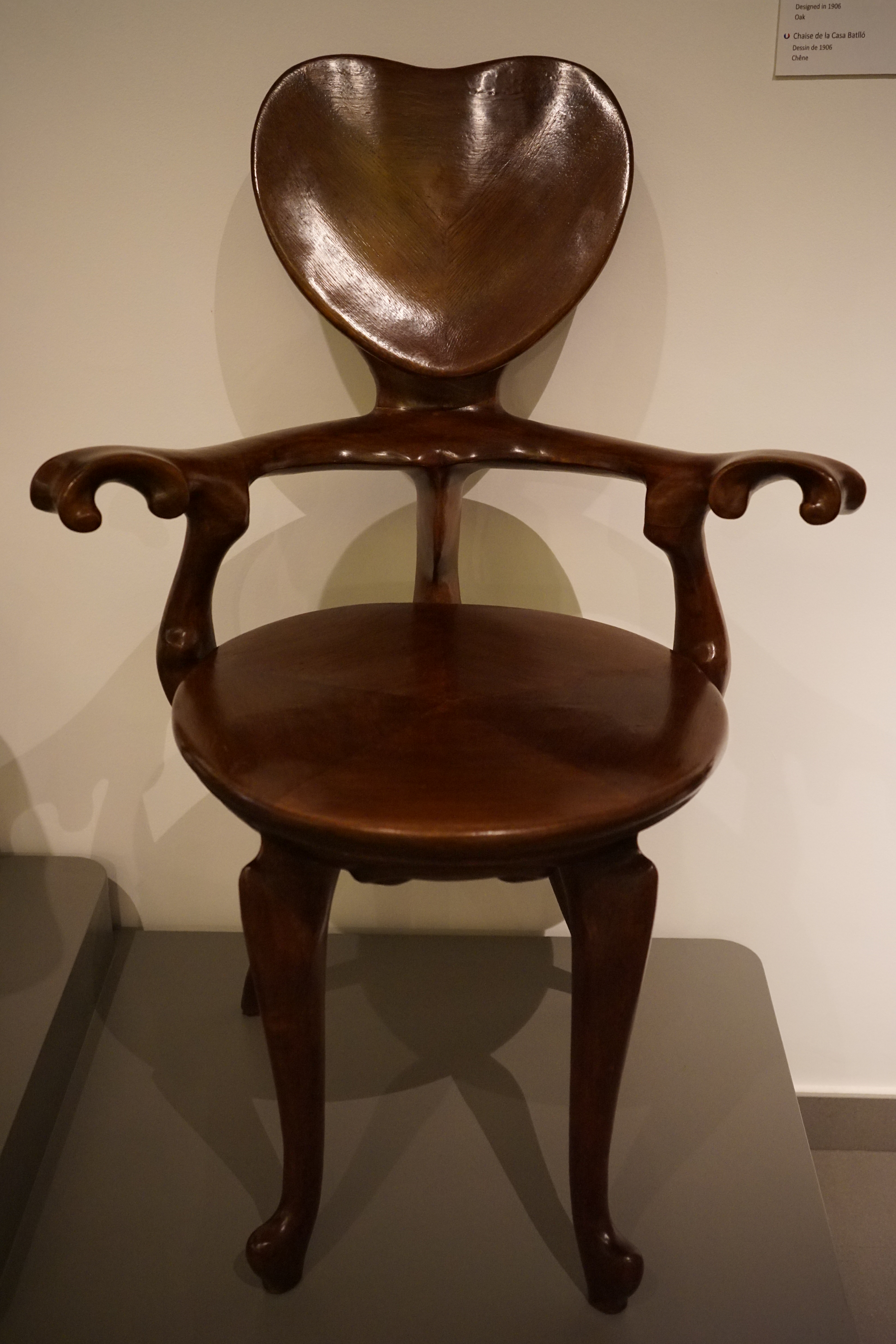
Chair in oak, designed 1906

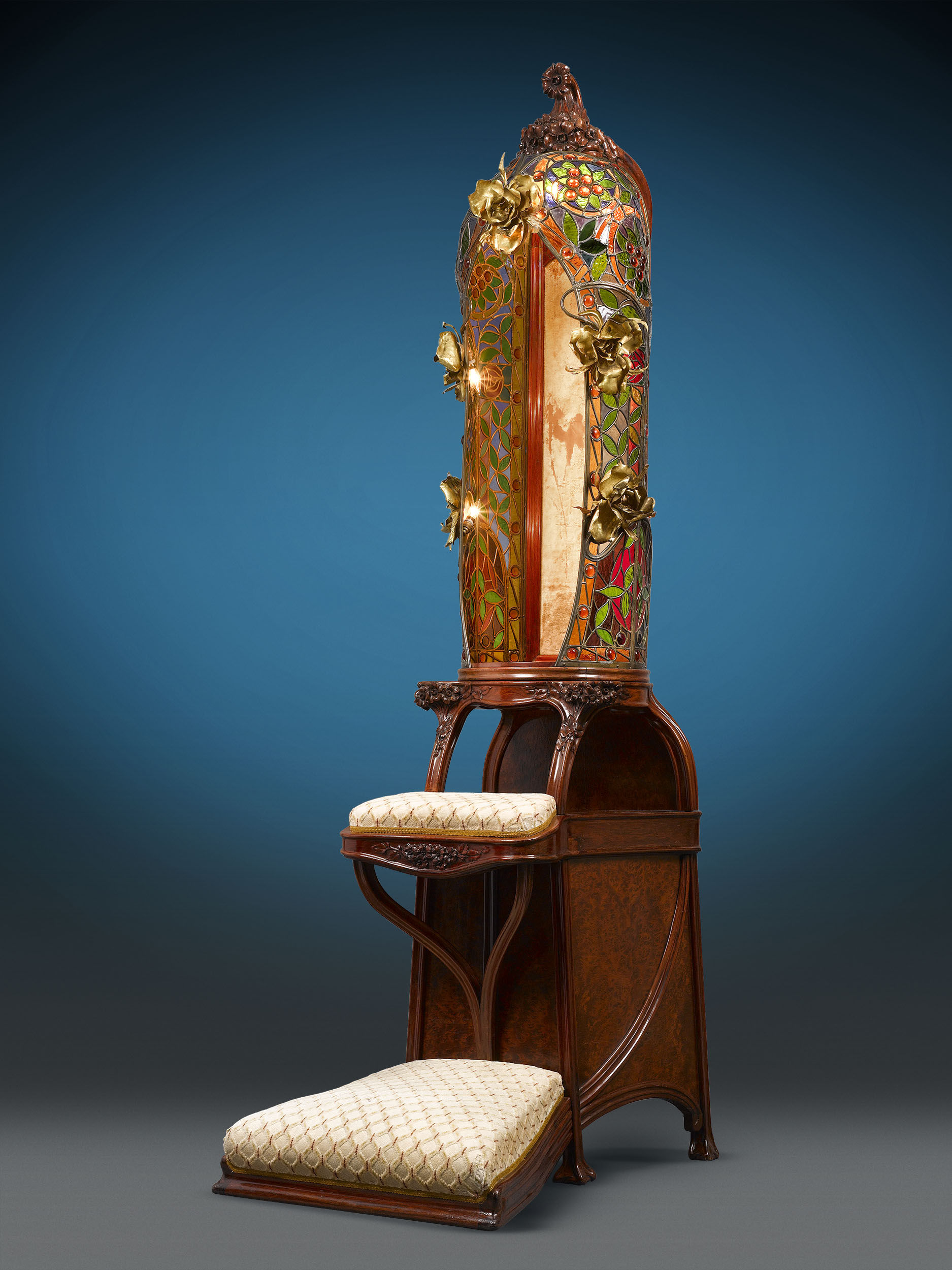
Prie Dieu, or prayer desk, designed 1906

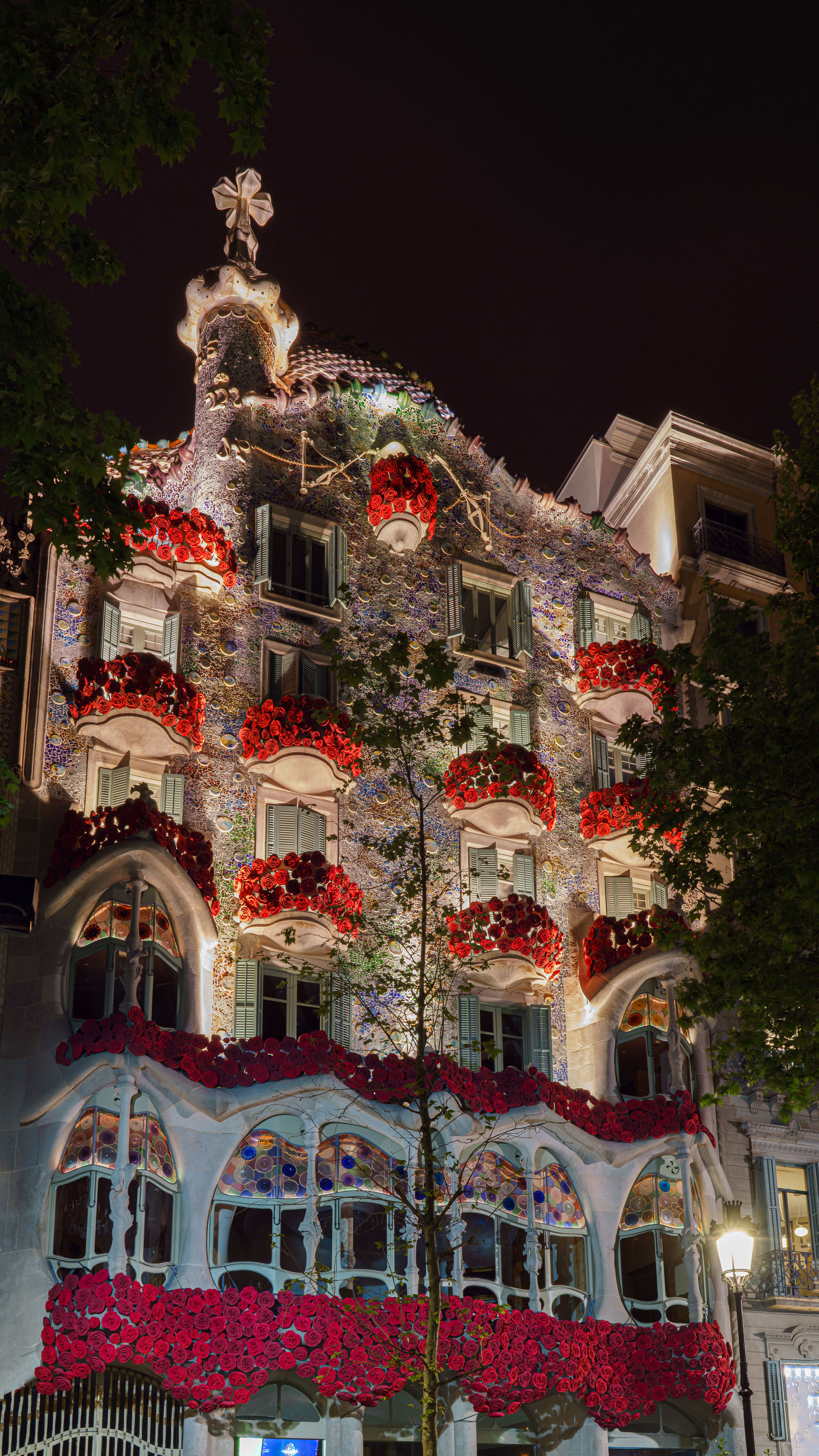
Casa Batlló - Night View with Flowers

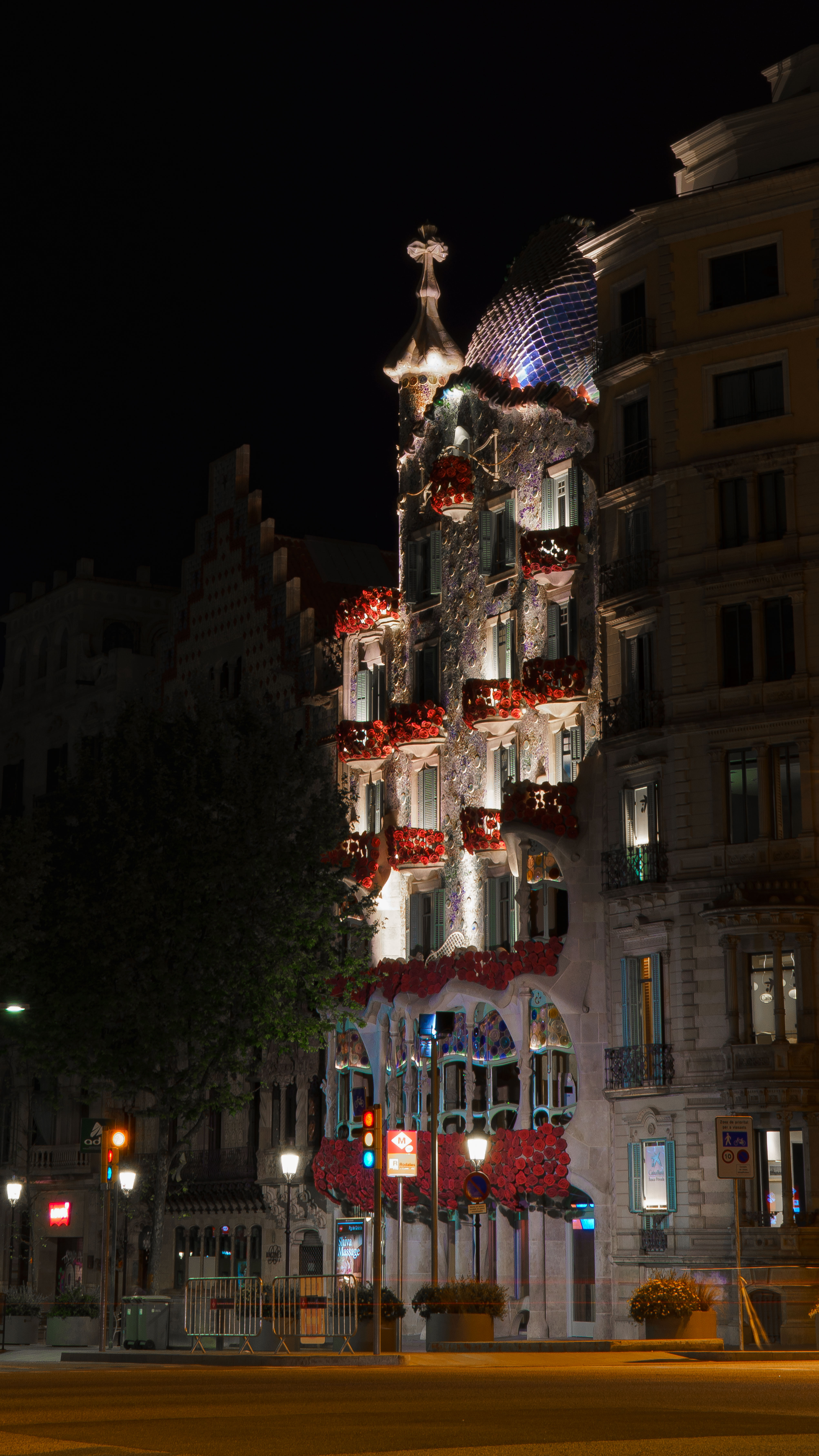
Casa Batlló - Night View Corner

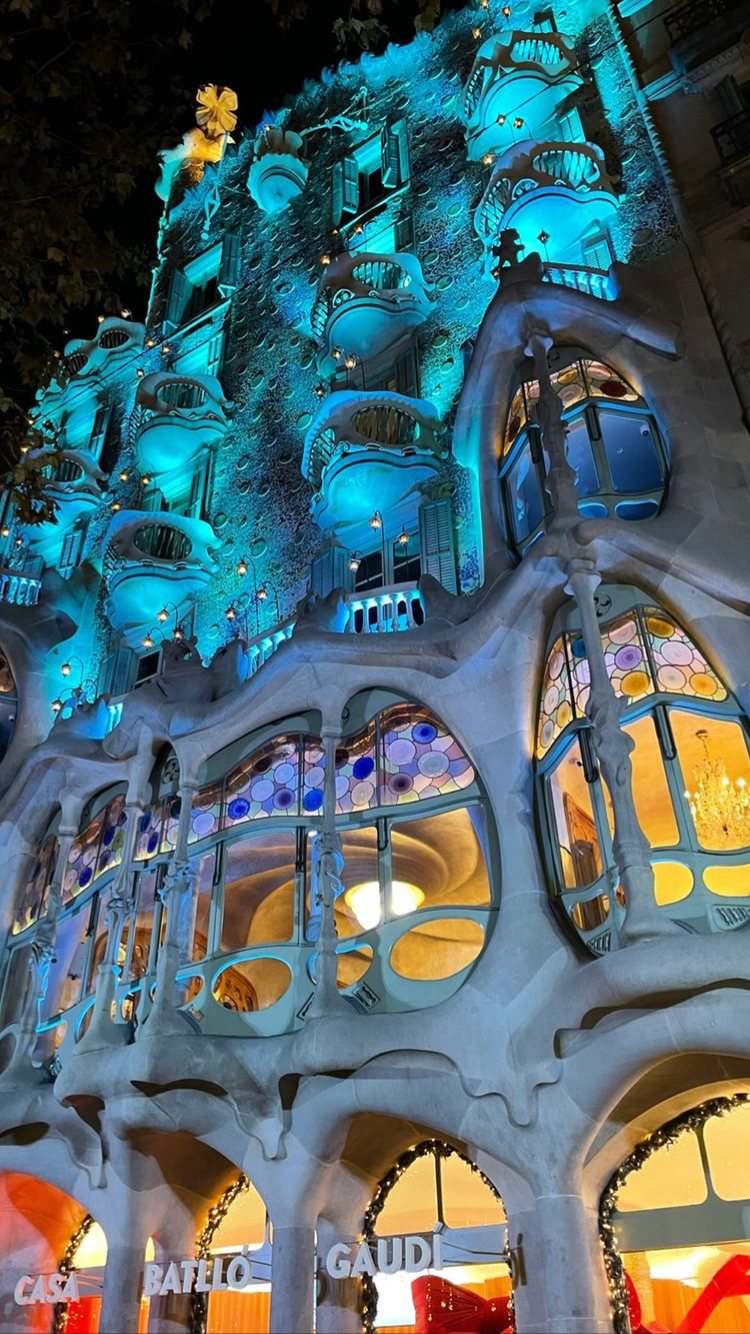
Casa Batlló night view with blue lights

== See also ==
- List of Gaudí buildings
- List of Modernista buildings in Barcelona
- Confidant from the Batlló House
