= Salon Pedal =

Print by Alexandre de Riquer

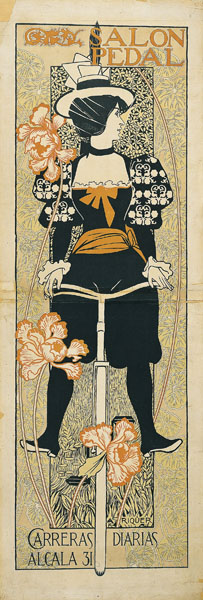
- Artist: Alexandre de Riquer
- Year: 1897
- Type: lithograph
- Dimensions: 139.4 cm × 48.5 cm (54.9 in × 19.1 in)
- Location: Museu Nacional d'Art de Catalunya; Barcelona

Salon Pedal is a color lithograph on paper designed in 1897 by the Catalan artist Alexandre de Riquer. The print's design evokes the decorative style seen in Modernisme art. The artwork is in the collection of Museu Nacional d'Art de Catalunya, in Barcelona.

== History ==
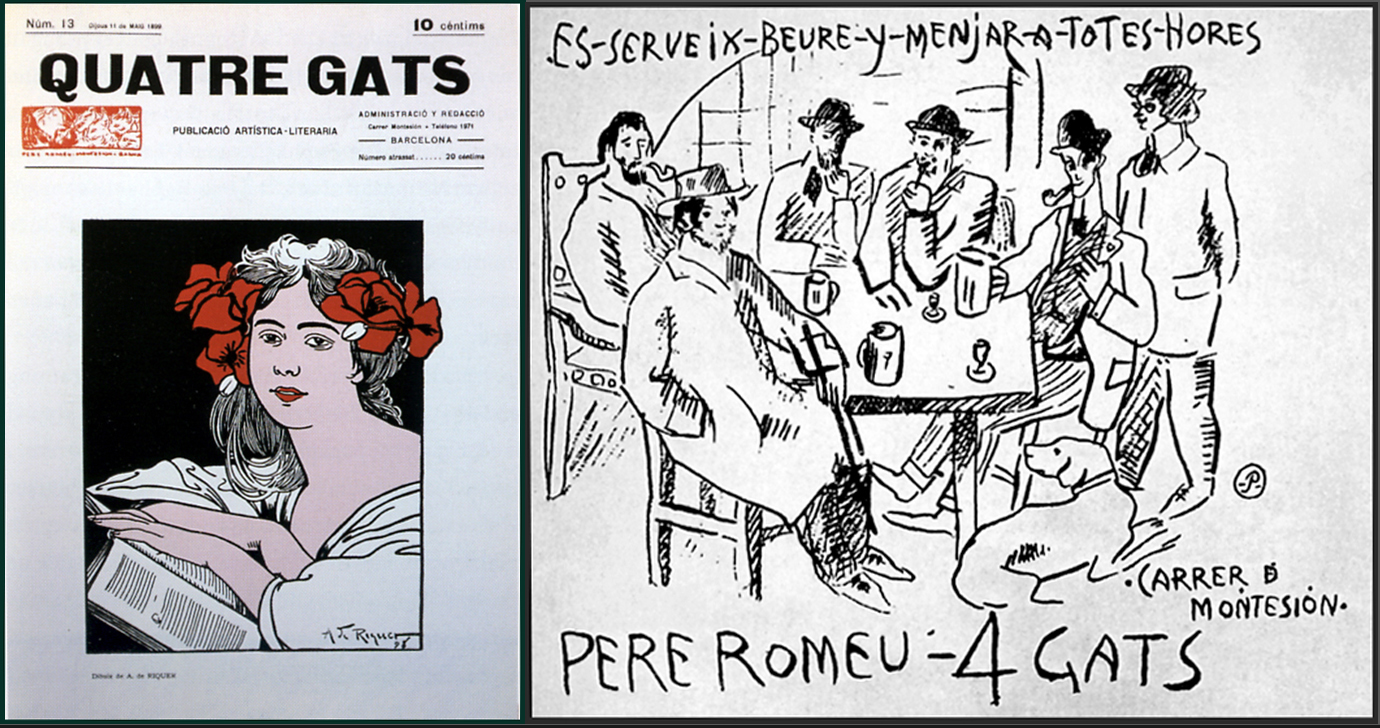
Cover illustration for the Quatre Gats Art Journal 1899 by Riquer

Els Quatre Gats is a famous cafe and considered as one of the main generators of the cultural movement known as Modernisme. It was the scene of lively conversations between Catalan artists Santiago Rusiñol, Ramon Casas, Maurice Utrillo, Pablo Picasso and Isidre Nonell. Casas decorated the cafe with two large paintings: "one, entitled Ramon Casas and Pere Romeu on a Tandem, features the painter with Pere Romeu, the owner of the cafe, on a bicycle; the other depicts the car which Casas, one of the first car owners in Catalonia, drove himself. These works represent the beginning of Modernisme, and the movement's interest in "mechanical innovations and the fascination of the painters and sculptors of this century for everything that went on around them. This is how sporting events became subjects for their works."

== Description ==
Giving the poster its allure, a female cyclist dressed in a black and white dress with hints of red details on her sash and bow, is the main focus. Framing this central figure in the simplistic composition is a rich border of floral ornamentation. Taking inspiration from English graphic art, "Riquer incorporated elements from many diverse influences; this ability to assimilate a range of styles helped him produce highly creative works and put an end to the banal, literary quality that had dominated poster aesthetics until then. As an example and as others have already noted, Salon Pedal, evokes Japanese printmaking." Riquer combined the aesthetics of the Gothic and japonism, which results to an "expressive quality of line enclosing flat surfaces imbued with subtle harmonies of color that gives the composition an antirealist feel in line with idealized, symbolist subject matter."

== Alexandre de Riquer ==
Alexandre de Riquer i Ynglada, 7th Count of Casa Dávalos (born May 3, 1856 – November 13, 1920), was a versatile artistic intellectual and Catalan Spanish designer, illustrator, painter, engraver, writer, and poet. He was one of the leading figures of Modernism in Catalonia. Riquer studied at Béziers, located in France from 1869 to 1871. For his interest in drawing classes, he enrolled in the School of Fine Arts in Toulouse of Languedoc. In the year 1894, he was introduced to the movement of the pre-Raphaelites. Riquer distinguished himself as a graphic designer with great drawing skills. He created posters, etchings, illustrations, certificates, postcards, stamps, menus, sheet music, business cards, and bookplates (which Lluís de Yebra documented 142 articles between 1900 and 1924).

== Analysis ==
Salon Pedal is one of Alexandre de Riquer's notable works which he created during the evolution of his art career as a professional graphic artist in Barcelona. He was known to experiment with many different styles from the very beginning of his art training; From traditional landscape painting to mastery of illustrative creations. Examples of his work can be found in many different locations in Barcelona. Some of which are the decoration for the chemist shop on the corner of Carrer Nou de la Rambla, the lobby of the Cercle del Liceu, the Great Hall of the Industrial Institute in Terrassa, and the interior decoration of the Cafe Català.

== Further Examples of de Riquer's Work ==
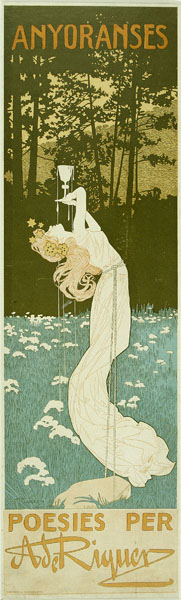
Poesies

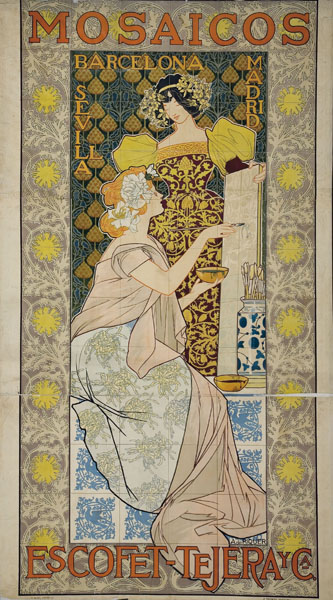
Escofet-Tejera i CiA

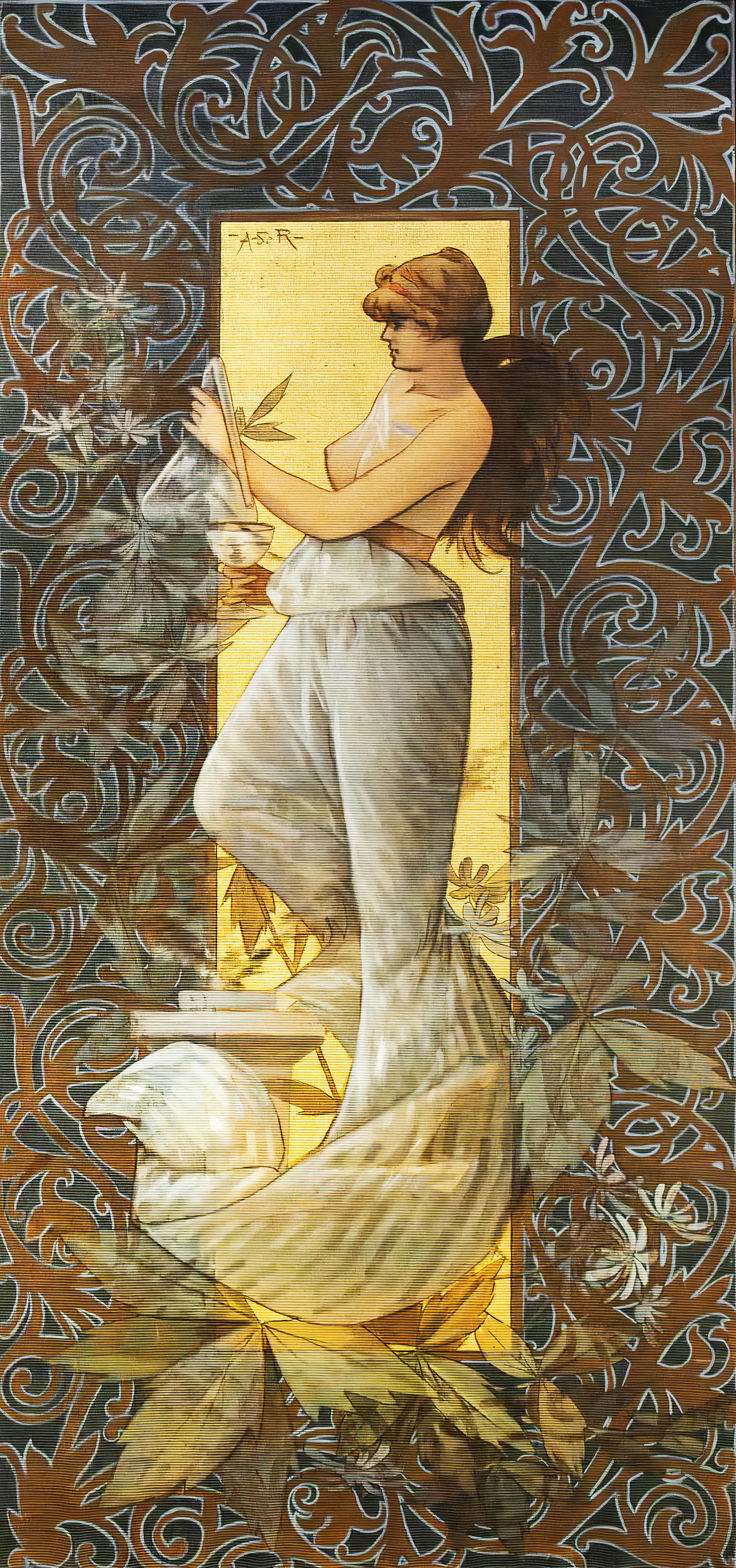
Figure with a glass

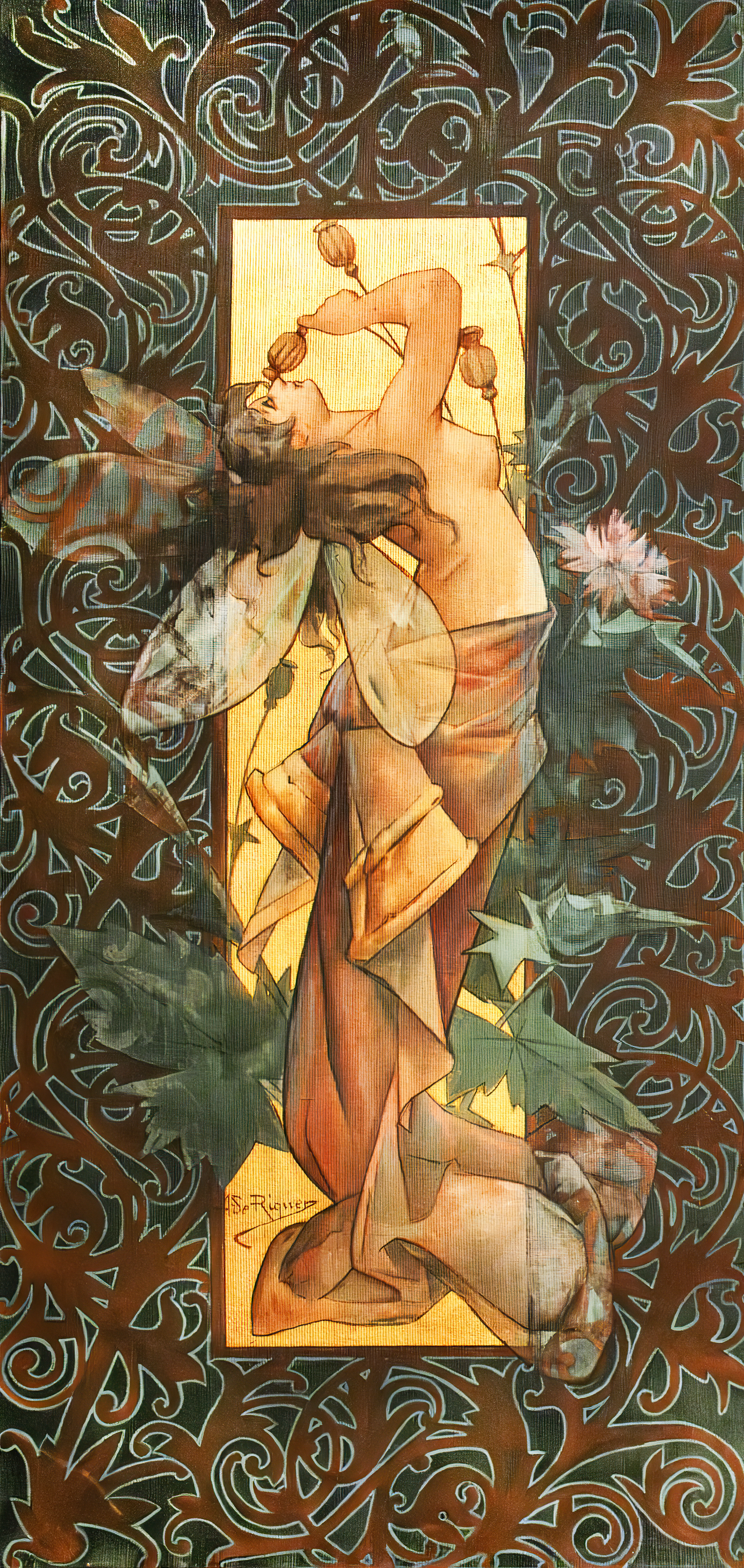
Smelling poppy

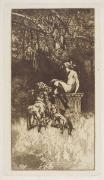
Allegorical composition

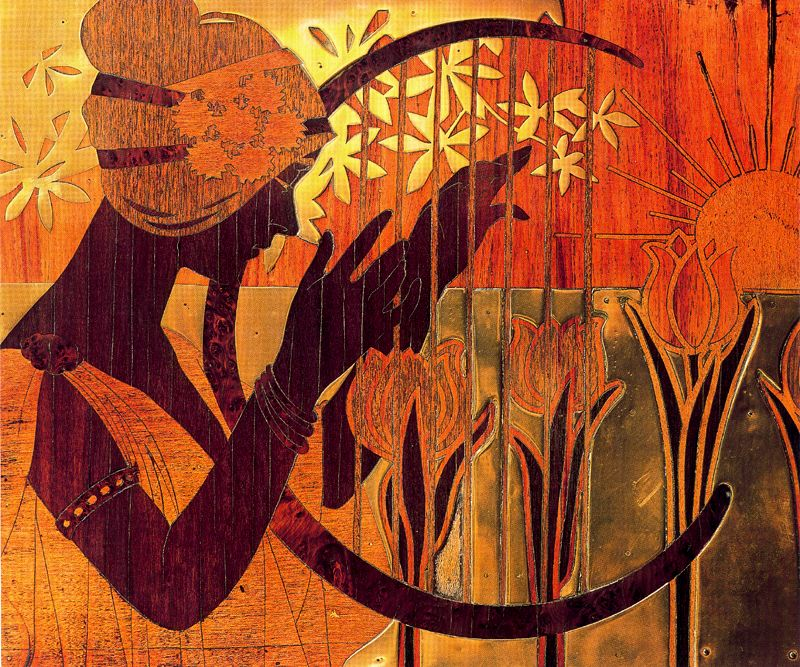
Panel at Cercle del Liceu

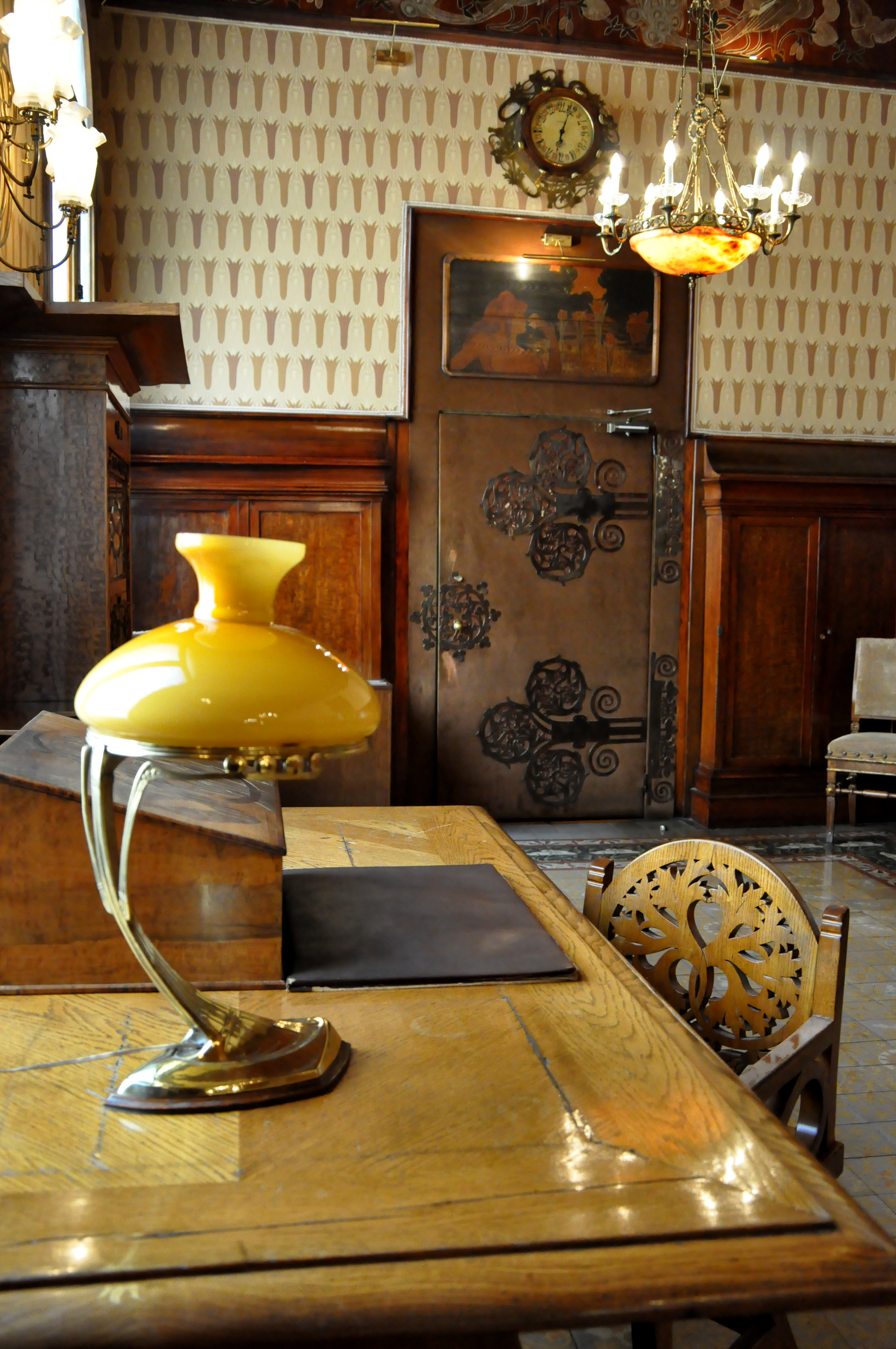
Interior view of the Cercle del Liceu
