= List of Modernista buildings in Barcelona =

The following is a partial list of the main Modernista (Catalan art nouveau) buildings located in Barcelona.

== List ==
Landmark name	Address	Architect	Description	Image
Sagrada Família	Carrer de Mallorca, 401; 41°24′13″N 2°10′28″E	Antoni Gaudí	An immense basilica that has been under construction since 1882. It is one of Barcelona's most popular tourist attractions and considered Gaudi's masterpiece.	
Park Güell	Carrer d’Olot, s/n 41°24′49″N 2°09′10″E	Antoni Gaudí	A garden complex with architectural elements situated on the hill of el Carmel in the Gràcia district, built in the years 1900 to 1914.	
Palau de la Música Catalana	Carrer de Sant Pere Més Alt, 4–6 41°23′15″N 2°10′30″E	Lluís Domènech i Montaner	A concert hall in Barcelona built between 1905 and 1908 for the choral society Orfeó Català. In 1909 it received an award for the best building of the year from the Barcelona City Council.	
Casa Milà	Passeig de Gràcia, 92; 41°23′43″N 2°09′42″E	Antoni Gaudí	Casa Milà or " La Pedrera" is a building located at Passeig de Gràcia Avenue, built during the years 1905–1910. It is probably Gaudi's second most popular building in Barcelona.	
Casa Amatller	Passeig de Gràcia, 41; 41°23′29.69″N 2°09′54.19″E	Josep Puig i Cadafalch	A building originally designed as a residence for chocolatier Antoni Amatller and constructed between 1898 and 1900.	
Casa Batlló	Passeig de Gràcia, 43; 41°23′30.08″N 2°09′53.64″E	Antoni Gaudí	A slender building originally built between 1875 and 1877 and remodelled in 1904-1906 by Gaudí and Josep Maria Jujol.	
Casa Lleó Morera	Passeig de Gràcia, 35; 41°23′28″N 2°09′56″E	Lluís Domènech i Montaner	A building originally constructed in 1864 but renovated in 1902. In 1906 it received an award for the best building of the year from the Barcelona City Council.	
Casa Calvet	Carrer de Casp, 48; 41°23′27″N 2°10′23″E	Antoni Gaudí	A building designed for a textile manufacturer and constructed in 1899, which served as both a commercial property (in the basement and on the ground floor) and a residence. In 1900 it received an award for the best building of the year from the Barcelona City Council.	
Hospital de Sant Pau	Carrer de St. Antoni Mª Claret, 167; 41°24′46″N 2°10′28″E	Lluís Domènech i Montaner	A complex built between 1901 and 1930. It was a fully functioning hospital until June 2009, since when it has been undergoing restoration for use as a museum and cultural center. In 1913 it received an award for the best building of the year from the Barcelona City Council.	
Bellesguard	Carrer de Bellesguard, 20; 41°24′34″N 2°07′36″E	Antoni Gaudí	A manor house located at the foot of Tibidabo, constructed between 1900 and 1909.	
Casa Martí	Carrer de Montsió, 3; 41°23′8.3″N 2°10′24.5″E	Josep Puig i Cadafalch	A building designed in 1896 and commissioned by relatives of Francesc Vilumara, a textile magnate. It hosted on the ground floor the café and restaurant Els Quatre Gats.	
Casa Vicens	Carrer de les Carolines, 18–24; 41°24′13″N 2°09′04″E	Antoni Gaudí	A family residence built for industrialist Manuel Vicens in the period 1883–1889.	
Palau Güell	Carrer Nou de la Rambla, 5; 41°22′44″N 2°10′25.9″E	Antoni Gaudí	A mansion designed for the Catalan industrial tycoon Eusebi Güell and constructed between years 1885–1900.	
Palau Mornau	Carrer Ample, 35; 41°22′53″N 2°10′49″E	Manuel Raspall	A 15th century edifice in Barcelona's Gothic Quarter remodelled within the style of Modernisme in 1908. In 2012 the building was refurbished and converted into the Hemp Museum Gallery.	
Castell dels Tres Dragons	Passeig de Picasso, s/n 41°23′16.97″N 2°11′0.13″E	Lluís Domènech i Montaner	A cafe-restaurant for the 1888 Barcelona Universal Exposition. It is considered to mark the beginning of the Modernista period. Now, the building contains Barcelona's Zoology Museum.	
Casa Bonaventura Ferrer	Passeig de Gràcia 103; 41°23′47.94″N 2°9′29.1″E	Pere Falqués i Urpí	Build in 1906. Since 1979 it has been listed as an historical and artistic heritage of Barcelona. In 2010 the building was remodeled and converted into a luxury boutique hotel under the name of "El Palauet".	
Casa de les Punxes	Avinguda Diagonal, 416–420; 41°23′52.71″N 2°9′50.55″E	Josep Puig i Cadafalch	Casa de les Punxes (House of Spikes) or Casa Terrades is a building located on Avinguda Diagonal constructed in 1905, commissioned by the Terrades sisters. The house includes different ceramic panels illustrating patriotic motifs. The best known depicts Saint George and with the following legend: "Sant Patró de Catalunya, torneu-nos la llibertat" ("Holy Patron of Catalonia, give us back our freedom").	
Casa Estapé	Passeig de Sant Joan, 6; 41°23′30.93″N 2°10′47.92″E	Bernardí Martorell i Rius	Casa Estapé, formerly known as Casa Laplana, is a house built in 1907, close to Arc de Triomf. The famous dome was designed by Jaume Bernades.	
Central Catalana d'Electricitat	Avinguda de Vilanova, 12; 41°23′31.8″N 2°10′53.80″E	Pere Falqués i Urpí	An industrial building constructed between 1896 and 1899 as the headquarters of Hidroeléctrica de Cataluña, a Catalan power company.	
Hivernacle	Passeig de Picasso, s/n 41°23′15.51″N 2°11′2.10″E	Josep Amargós i Samaranch	A greenhouse located in the Parc de la Ciutadella built for the 1888 Barcelona Universal Exposition.	
Umbracle	Passeig de Picasso, s/n 41°23′12.34″N 2°11′6.41″E	Josep Fontserè i Mestre	A shade house located in the Parc de la Ciutadella built for the 1888 Barcelona Universal Exposition. During the exhibition it was used as a pavilion and afterwards, the building recovered its original function.	
Molly's Fair City	Carrer de Ferran, 7; 41°22′50.42″N 2°10′28.08″E	unknown	A shop which opened at the end of the nineteenth century. Now, it is an Irish pub.	
Lampposts in Plaça Reial	Plaça Reial, s/n 41°22′48.43″N 2°10′31.06″E	Antoni Gaudí	Two lampposts located in the center of Plaça Reial. Built in 1879, they were one of the first works of Gaudí.	
London Bar	Carrer Nou de la Rambla, 34; 41°22′41.14″N 2°10′23.28″E	unknown	A legendary bar which opened in 1910. It was frequented by notable people such as Ernest Hemingway, Pablo Picasso, Joan Miró and Salvador Dalí.	
Camiseria Bonet	Rambla dels Caputxins, 72; 41°22′50.85″N 2°10′25.93″E	unknown	A clothing store opened in 1890. Until 2002 the store was run by the Bonets. Now the shop is used as a gift shop.	
Café de l'Òpera	Rambla dels Caputxins, 74; 41°22′51.27″N 2°10′25.56″E	unknown	The original building dates back to the 18th century and was used as a tavern. During the 19th century the premises were changed into a chocolatería and after a few more changes, at the end of the 1920s, it was reformed in a Modernista style and the cafe was given its current name. The building, located on the Rambla, lies directly opposite the Liceu Opera House.	
Hotel España	Carrer Sant Pau, 9-11; 41°22′48.62″N 2°10′22.17″E	Lluís Domènech i Montaner	The original hotel opened in 1859 under the name Fonda de España. It was renovated in the early twentieth century by Domènech i Montaner with the collaboration of Eusebi Arnau and Alfons Juyol. In 1903 it received an award for the best commercial building of the year from the Barcelona City Council.	
Casa Comalat	Avinguda Diagonal, 442; 41°23′49.58″N 2°9′38.26″E	Salvador Valeri i Pupurull	A building constructed between 1909 and 1911. It is remarkable for its two facades: the main facade (Av. Diagonal) and the rear facade (Carrer Còrsega).	
Casa Macaya	Passeig de Sant Joan, 108; 41°23′59.37″N 2°10′09.96″E	Josep Puig i Cadafalch	An urban residence built in 1901. Eusebi Arnau, Alfons Juyol, Manuel Ballarín and Joan Paradís collaborated with Puig i Cadafalch on this project.	
Casa Pomar	Carrer Girona, 86; 41°23′44.2″N 2°10′13″E	Joan Rubió i Bellver	A slender building with an outstanding first-floor gallery constructed between years 1904–1906.	
Torre Cortés	Pl. Pedralbes, s/n 41°23′43.62″N 2°6′49.35″E	Salvador Valeri i Pupurull	A detached house with a curved facade built in 1913.	
Les Planes railway station	Les Planes; 41°25′38.63″N 2°05′29.40″E		The only modernista railway station in Catalonia	

== See also ==
- Modernisme
- Antoni Gaudí
  - List of Gaudí buildings
- Lluís Domènech i Montaner
- Josep Puig i Cadafalch
