= Casa Martí =

Building in Barcelona, Catalonia, Spain

Coordinates: 41°23′8.3″N 2°10′24.5″E

The Casa Martí (Catalan pronunciation: [ˈkazə məɾˈti]) is a modernista building designed by Josep Puig i Cadafalch in 1896, having been commissioned by relatives of Francesc Vilumara, a textile magnate. It stands at Carrer Montsió, 3, Barcelona.

Striking features of the building, more northern-European than Catalan in appearance, are the large pointed arches on the ground floor containing stained-glass windows, the curious ornamentation of the upper-floor windows and the balconies in Flamboyant style. The exterior is also notable for sculptures by Eusebi Arnau, wrought ironwork by Manuel Ballarín and, on a pedestal on the corner, a statue of Saint Joseph by Josep Llimona. The existing one is a reproduction of the original, which was destroyed during the Civil War and replaced by the City Council in 2000.

The building has not been preserved in its entirety. The original lintel of the door by Puig i Cadafalch disappeared in one of the modifications that the building has undergone in its more than one hundred years of history.

On the ground floor there is the Quatre Gats tavern, which was one of the artistic and cultural epicentres of Barcelona between 1897 and 1903. Ramon Casas, Santiago Rusiñol and Pablo Picasso were amongst the illustrious figures who ate and drank here. The interior decor was financed by Ramon Casas, who paid for the circular chandeliers and the mediaeval furniture designed by Puig i Cadafalch. Another of his “presents” was the painting showing two men, the owner of the establishment Pere Romeu and Casas himself, pedalling a tandem; the one now in the bar is a copy, the original being in the Museu Nacional d'Art de Catalunya.

Between 1903 and 1936, Casa Martí was hosting the Cercle Artístic de Sant Lluc.

The building was declared an Asset of National Cultural Interest on 9 January 1976.

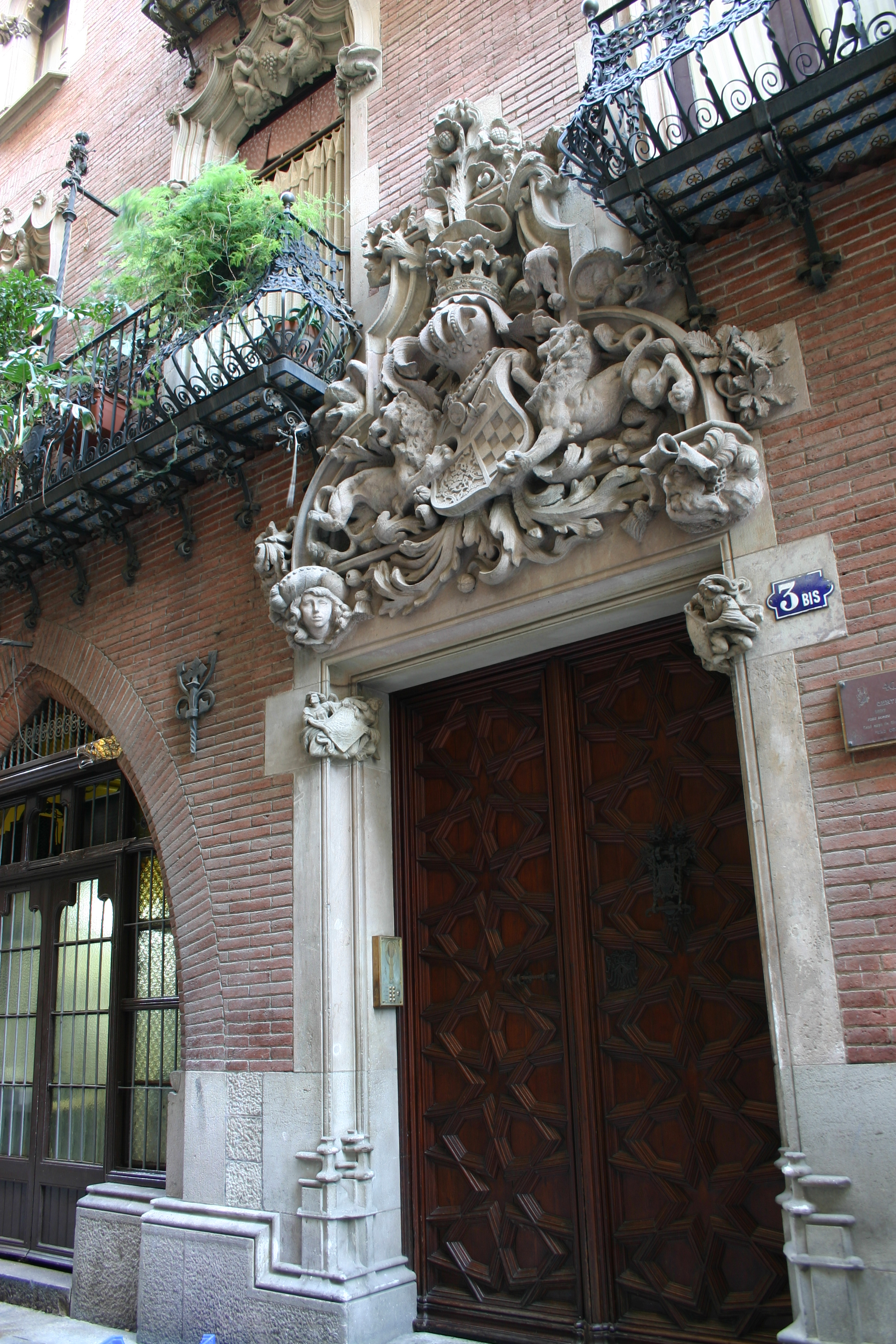

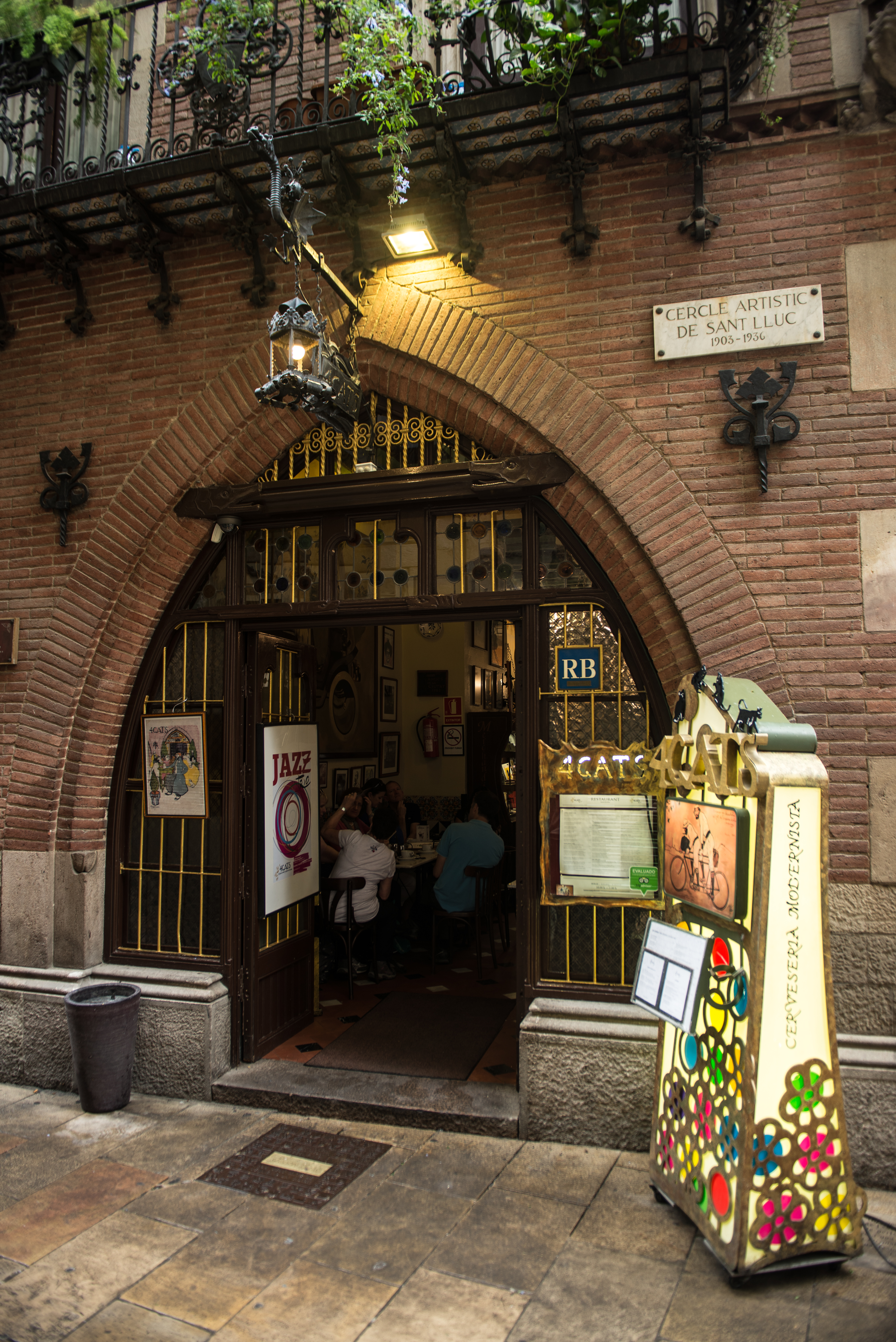

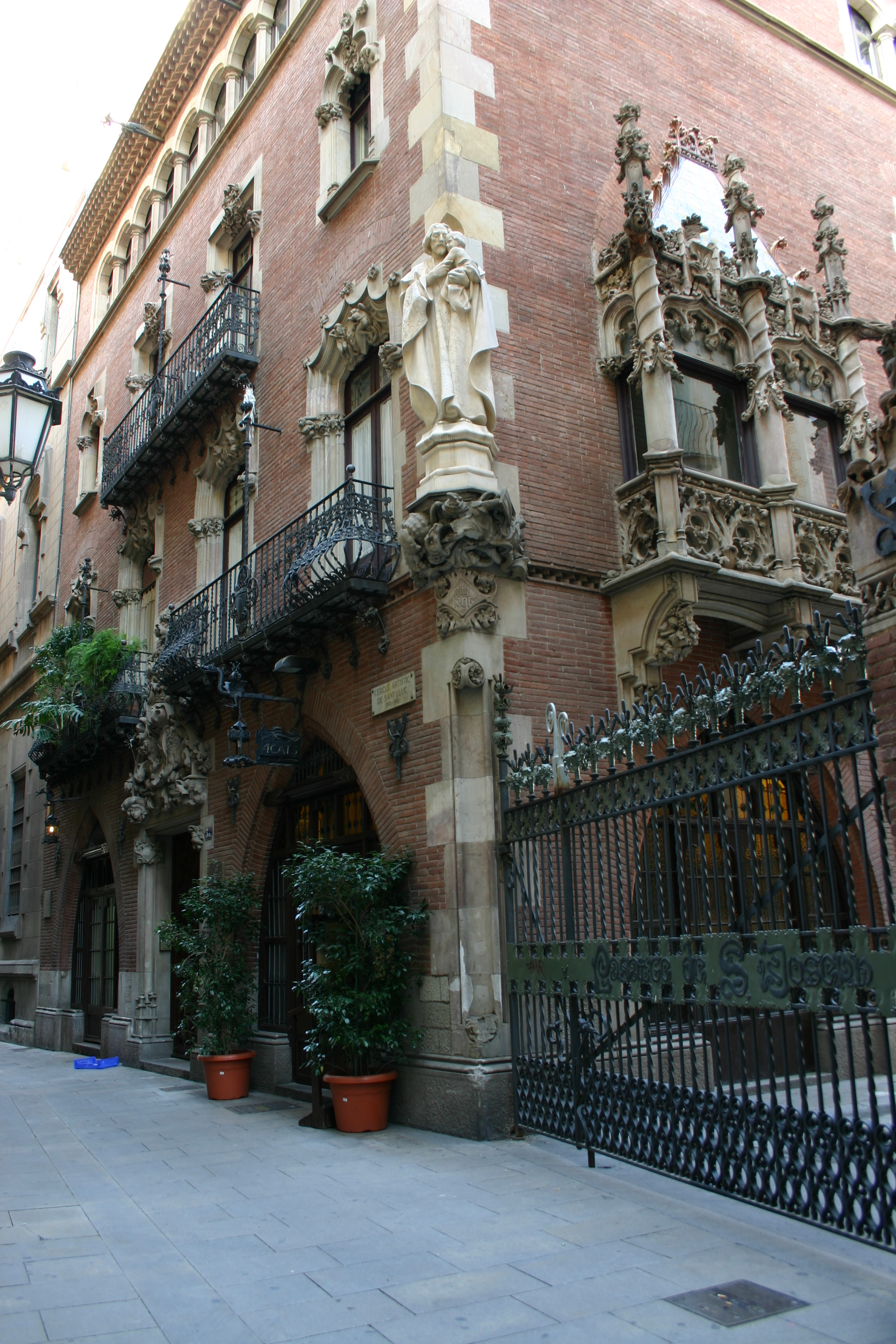

== See also ==
- List of Modernisme buildings in Barcelona

== Sources ==
· Translated from Catalan Wikipedia
