= Casa Bonaventura Ferrer =

Building in Barcelona, Catalonia, Spain

Coordinates: 41°23′47.94″N 2°9′29.1″E

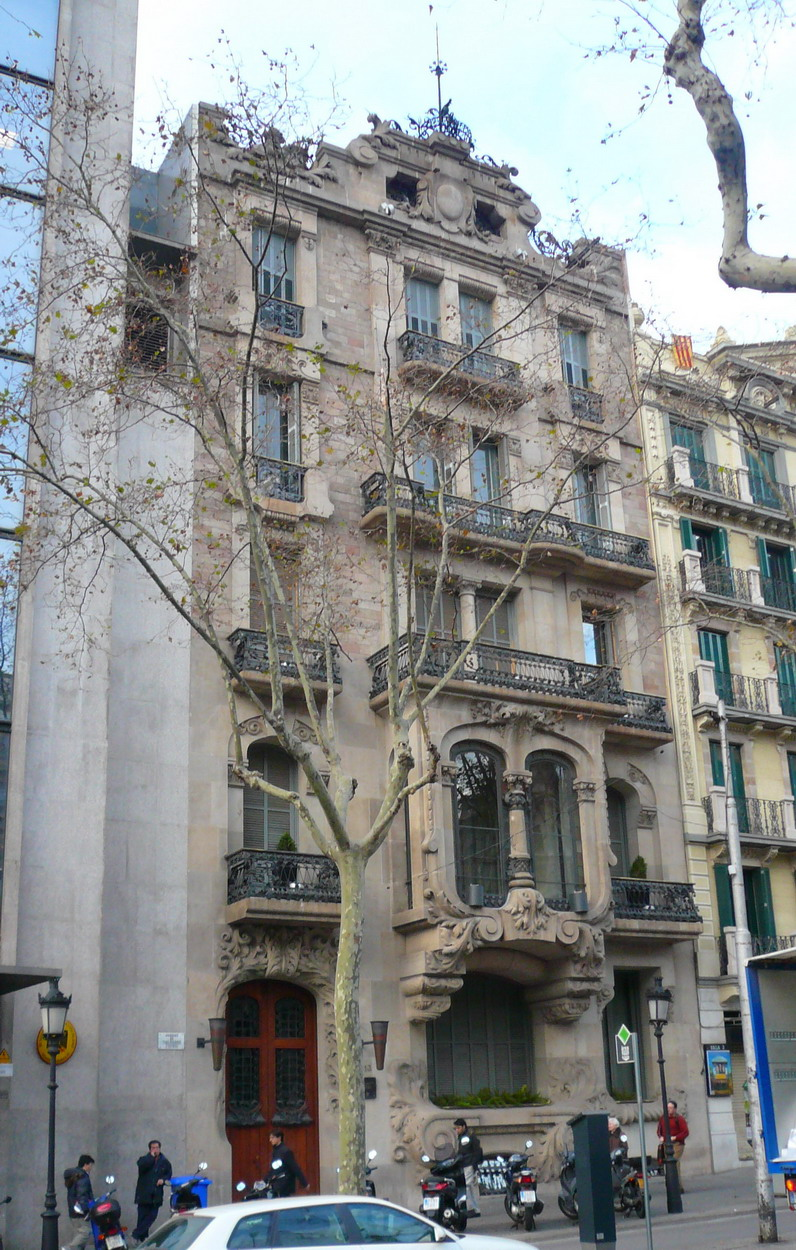
Casa Bonaventura Ferrer Architect Pere Falqués.

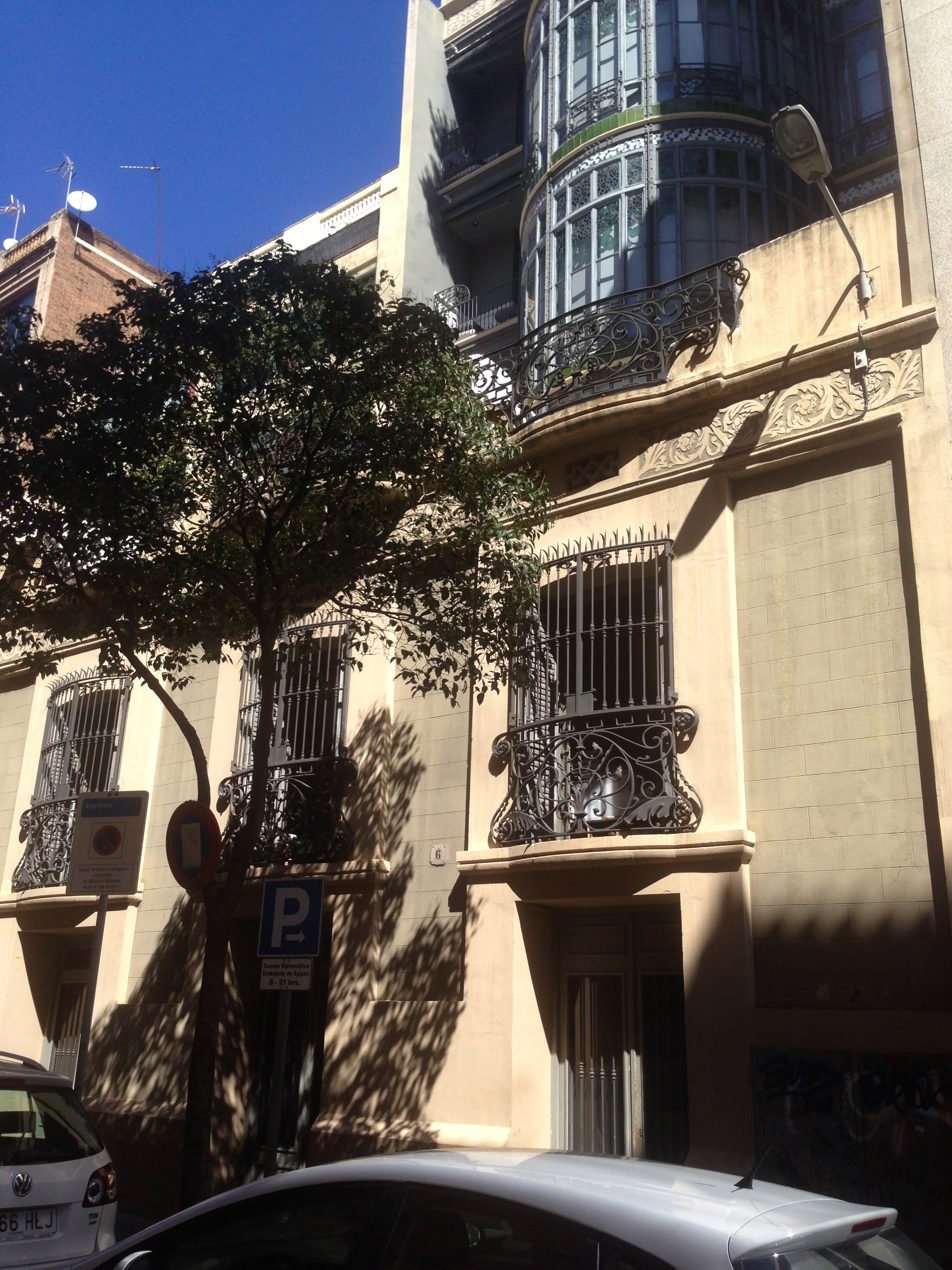
Casa Bonaventura Ferrer rear facade

Casa Bonaventura Ferrer is a building located at number 113 of Passeig de Gràcia in Barcelona, Catalonia, Spain, and rear facade at number 6 in the Riera de Sant Miquel. It is a project of the architect Pere Falqués i Urpí following a Modernisme or Art Nouveau style, being erected in 1906.

Since 1979 it has been listed as an historical and artistic heritage of Barcelona. The building is best known in the city as "El Palauet" (cute little palace) for its extraordinary beauty and reduced size. In 2010, the building was remodeled and converted into a luxury boutique hotel under the name of "El Palauet".

== Building ==
The building sits on top of a vaulted basement built with brick, a ground floor, a first floor known in Barcelona as "principal" (nobel floor), three more floors and a roof terrace with a large skylight that illuminates the stairwell. On the facade, three vertical bodies highlights the platform with sculpture carved in stone and a big hole in their basement, as a counterpoint between hollow and filled spaces. The wood door and iron balconies are the croan of the baroque inspired building.

The ground floor is probably one of the most important areas of the building from a decorative point of view. The ceilings are decorated with spectacular polychrome floral composition decorations in high relief plaster in Modernisme or Art Nouveau style. Handcrafted wooden doors and sliding doors are artistically carved with decorative cups designs.

The rear facade is composed of a ground floor on top of which rests a large terrace coated on white marble trencadis where a semicircular platform of wood, iron, ceramic and multicolored came glasswork rests forming a large semi-circular stained glass window with floral Modernisme decoration.

== Gallery ==
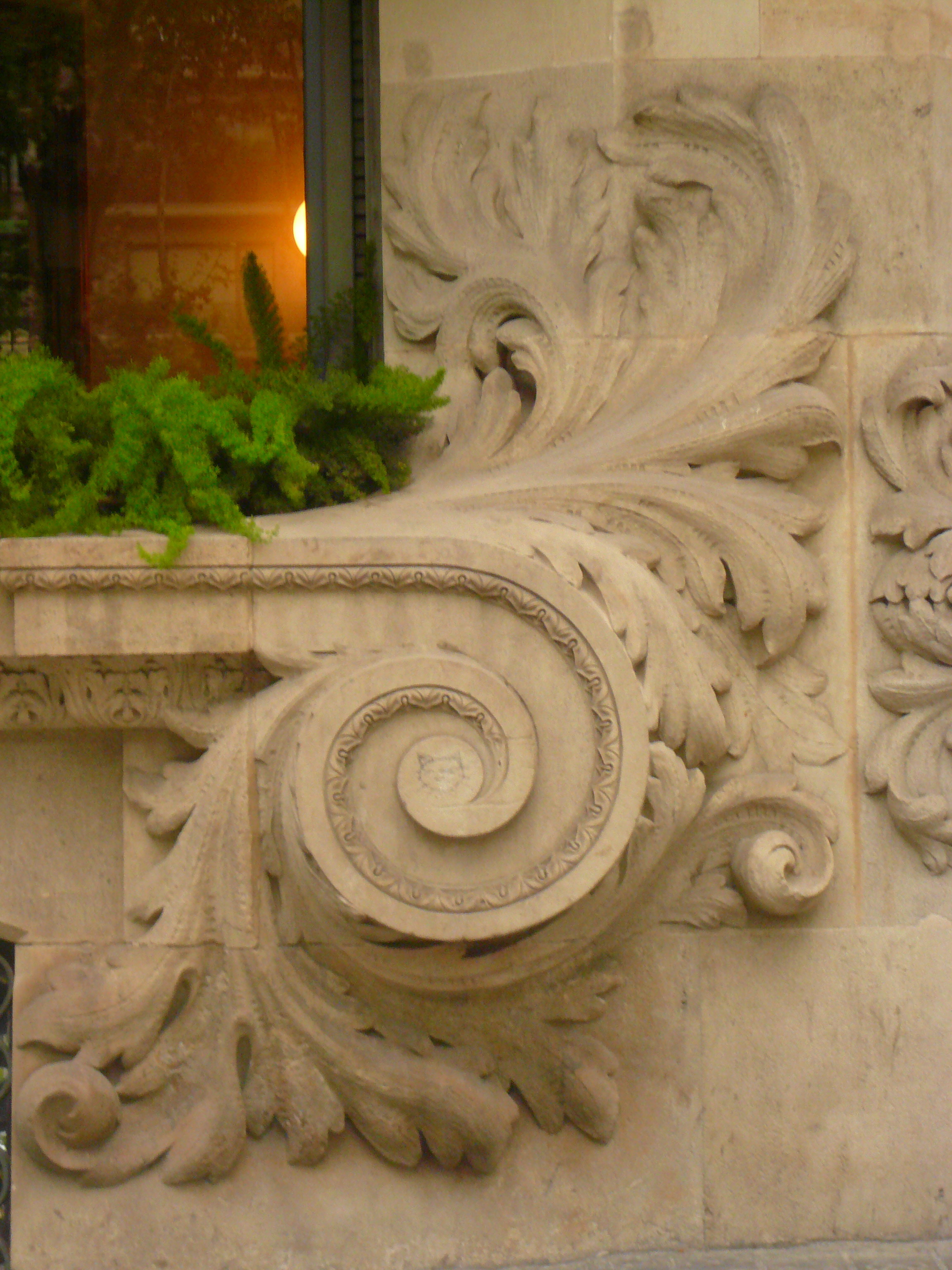
Ornamental exterior detail

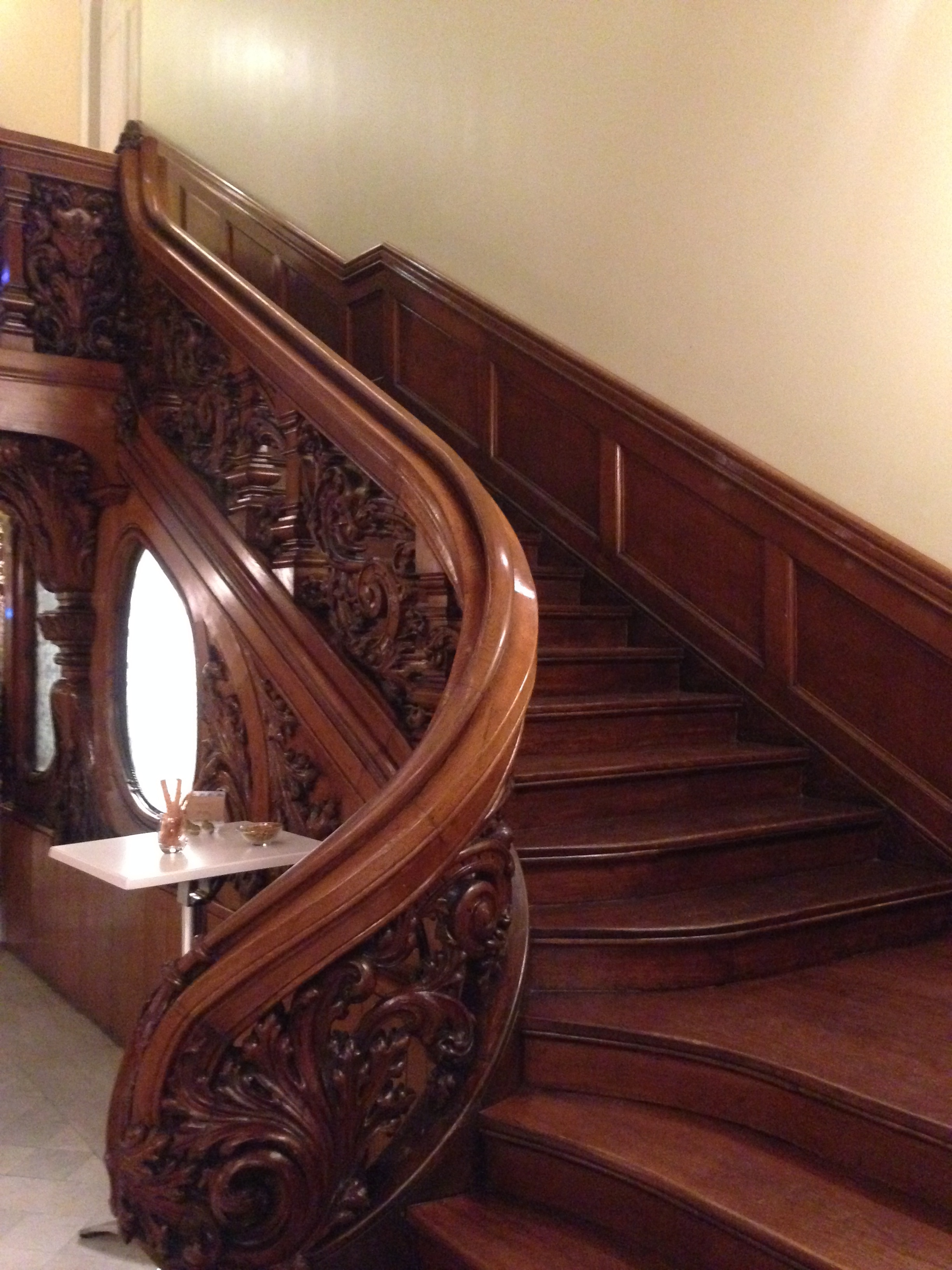
Interior staircase

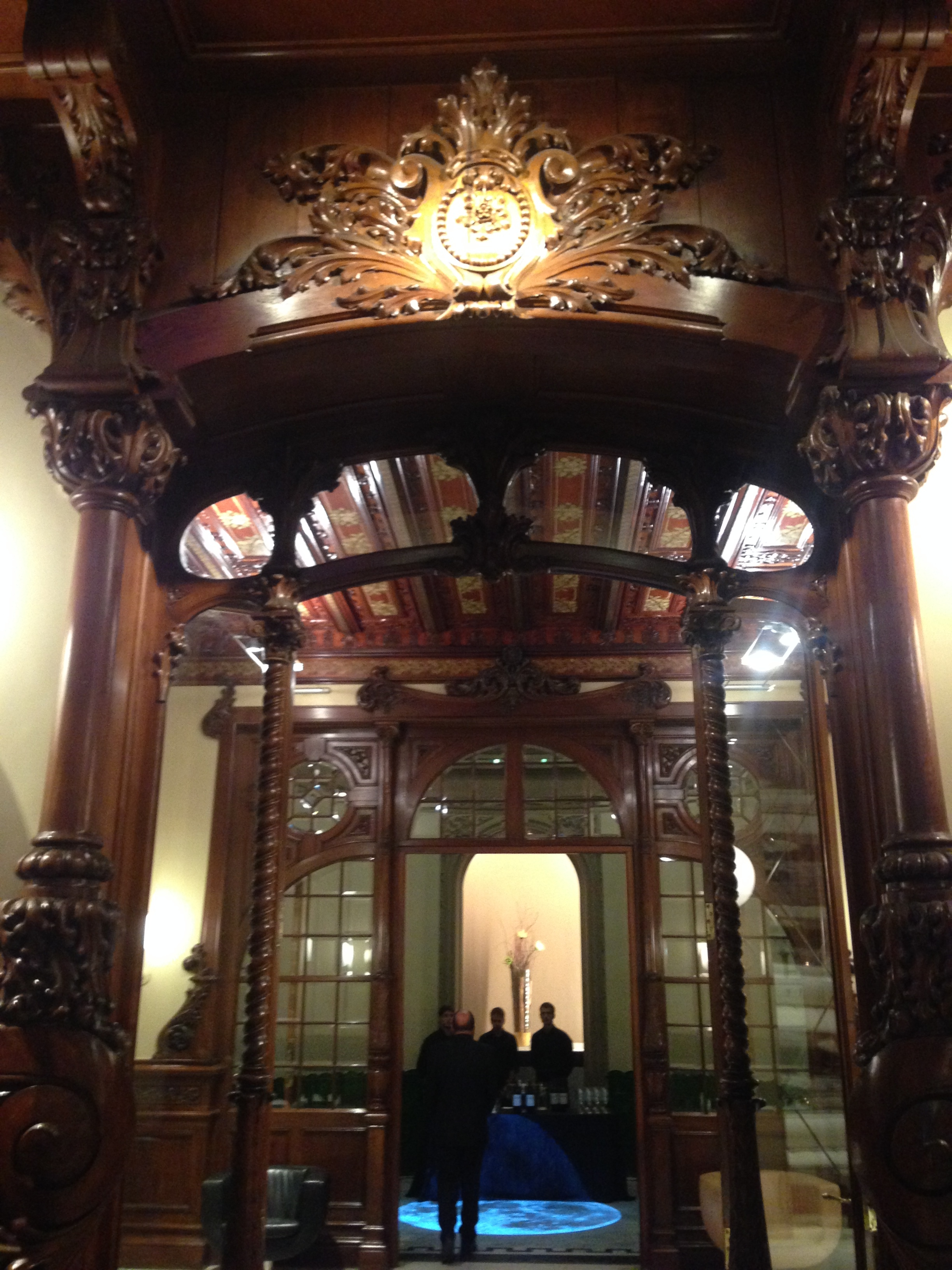
Interior wood door

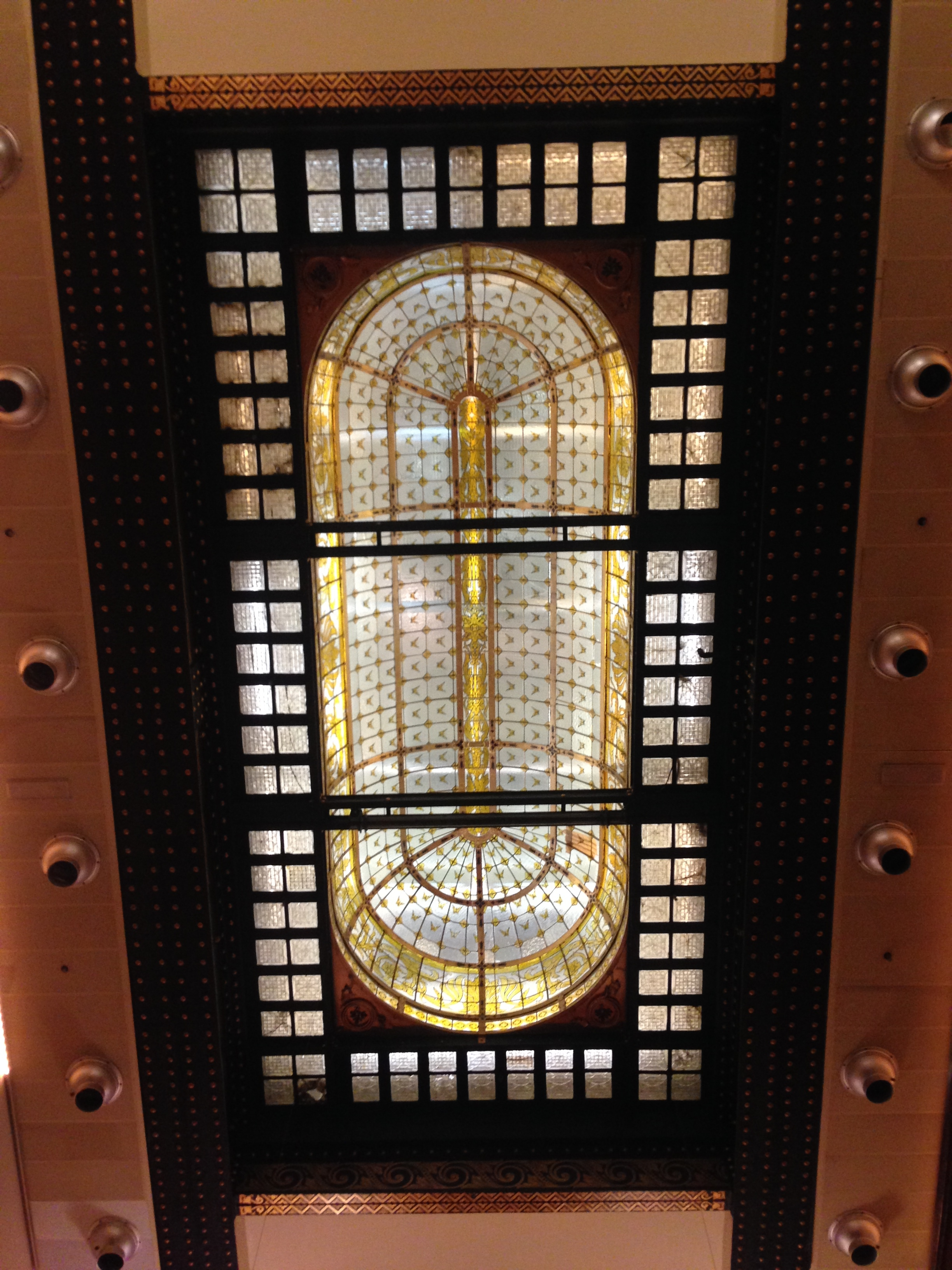
Skylight

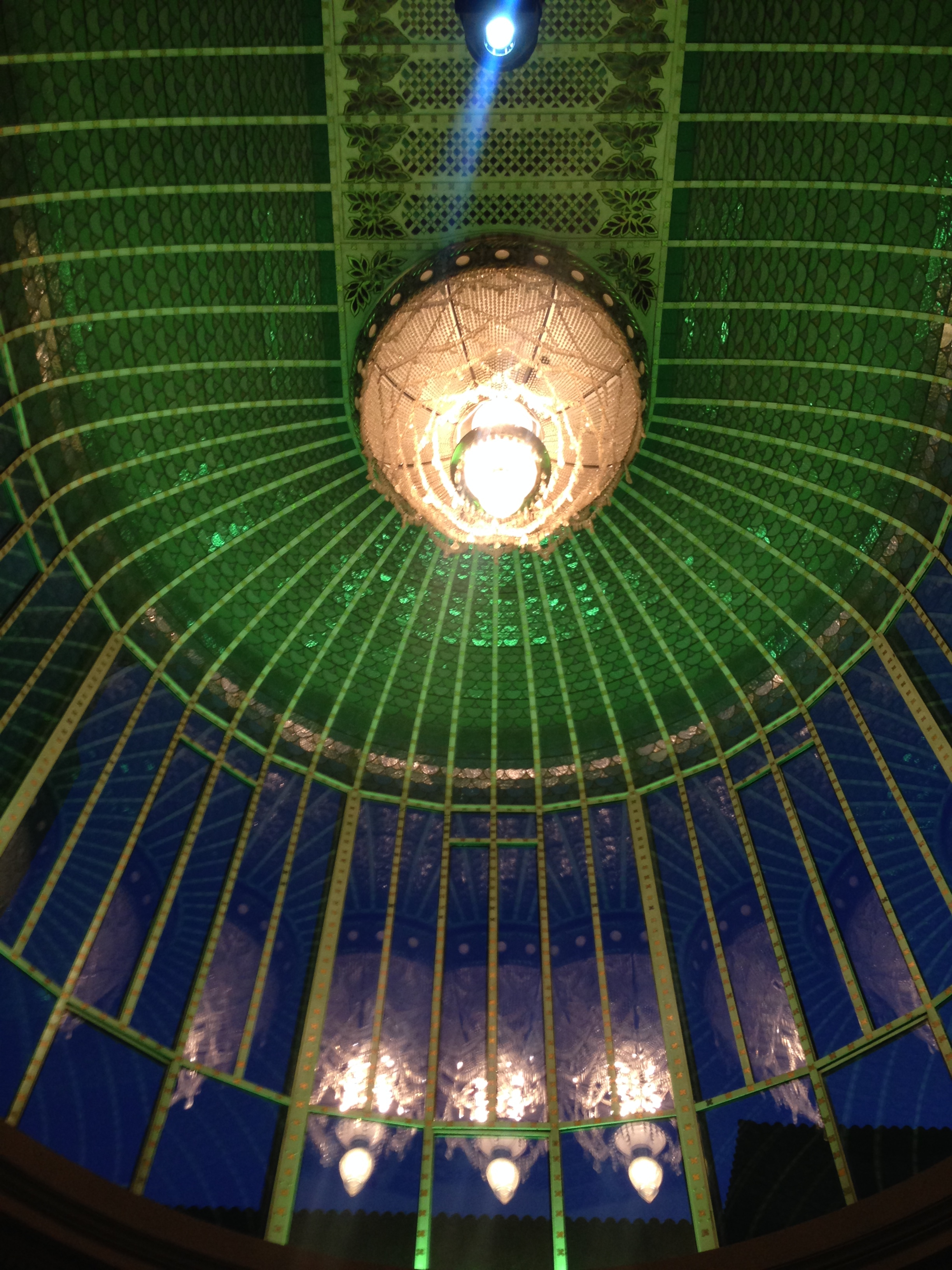
Glass pending lamp

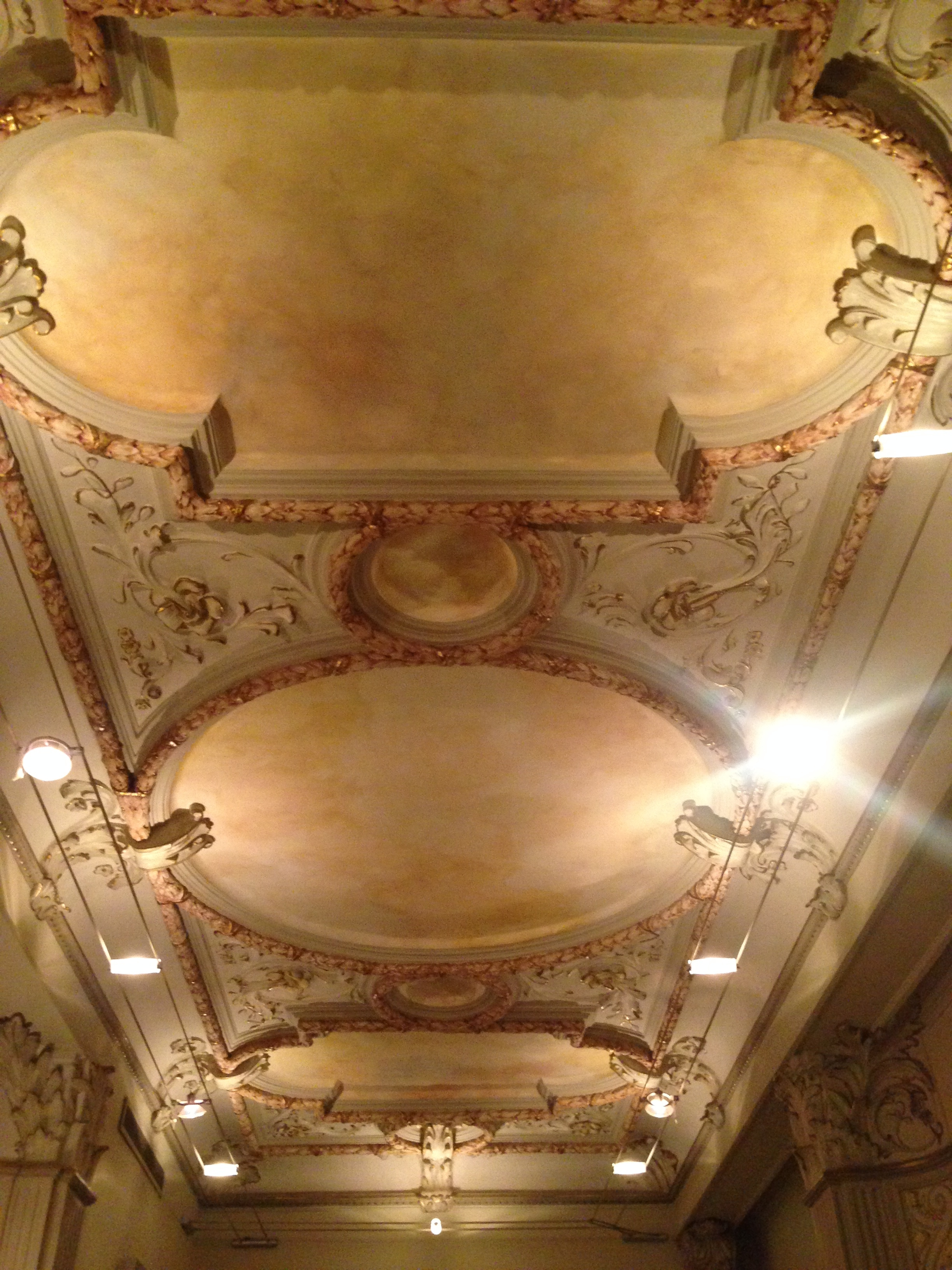
Coloured plaster ceiling

== See also ==
- List of Modernisme buildings in Barcelona

== Bibliography ==
- Permanyer, Lluís (1998). Un passeig per la Barcelona Modernista (in Catalan). Barcelona, Ediciones Polígrafa SA. ISBN 84-343-0877-0.
