= Ramon Casas and Pere Romeu in an Automobile =

Painting by Ramon Casas

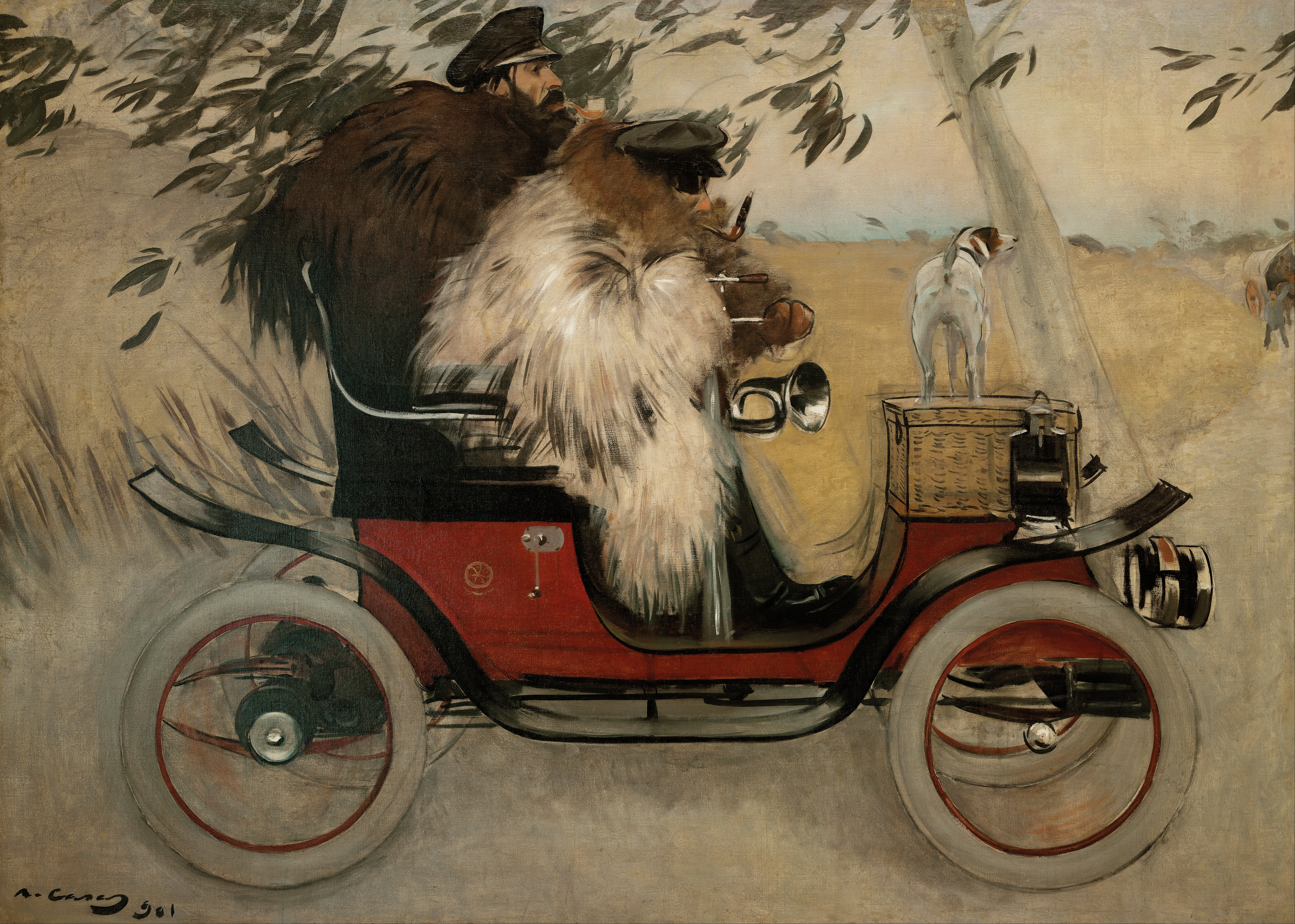
- Artist: Ramon Casas i Carbó
- Year: 1901
- Medium: Oil on canvas
- Dimensions: 208 cm × 291 cm (82 in × 115 in)
- Location: Museu Nacional d'Art de Catalunya, Barcelona

Ramon Casas and Pere Romeu in an Automobile is an oil-on-canvas painting by Spanish painter Ramon Casas, created in 1901. It is held at the National Art Museum of Catalonia, in Barcelona.

== Description ==
The painting depicts the artist and his friend, the businessman Pere Romeu (1862–1908), in a red automobile. Casas is sitting at the wheel and the two men are wearing hats and large furs. Each one also has a pipe in his mouth. In front of the car, the artist's dog Ziem stands on a basket and scouts for an oncoming carriage. The speed is emphasized by the positions of the two drivers and the movement of his wheels. The talent of Casas as one of the great poster artists of Catalan modernism can be noticed in the imagery of the painting.

This canvas actually replaced another one by Casas, with the same men riding on a tandem, in 1901, at the decoration of the art café "Els Quatre Gats", usually attended by both of them, which they had co-founded and was a stronghold of modernism in Barcelona. The two paintings came to symbolize the transition between the old (the tandem bicycle) and the new (the automobile), and both have become synonymous with Catalan modernism.

== See also ==
- Ramon Casas and Pere Romeu on a Tandem
