= Ramon Casas and Pere Romeu on a Tandem =

Painting by Ramon Casas

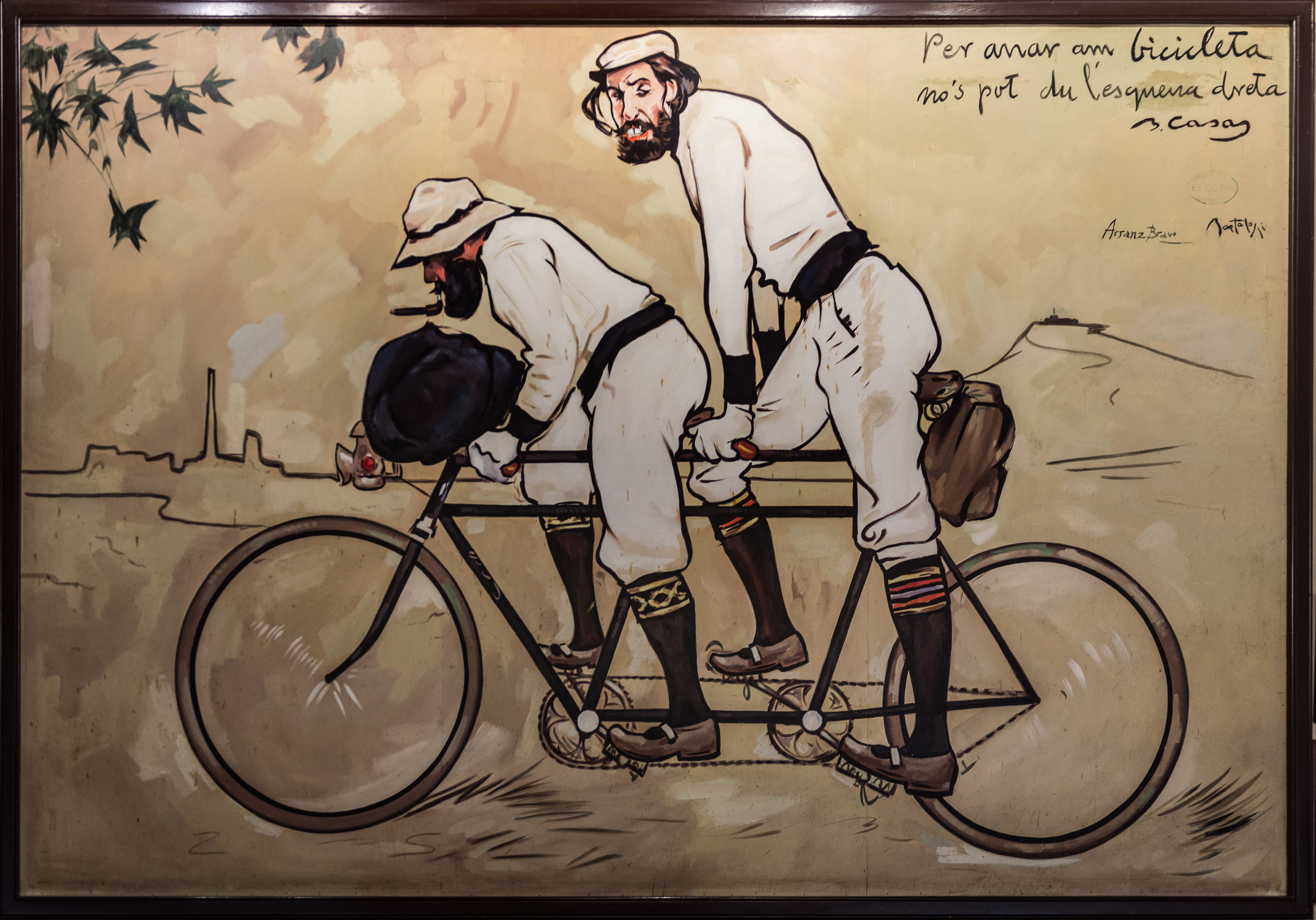
- Artist: Ramon Casas
- Year: 1897
- Medium: Oil on canvas
- Dimensions: 191 cm × 215 cm (75 in × 85 in)
- Location: Museu Nacional d'Art de Catalunya; Barcelona

Ramon Casas and Pere Romeu on a Tandem is an oil on canvas painting by Ramon Casas, from 1897. It is held at the National Art Museum of Catalonia, in Barcelona.

== Description ==
Casas painted Ramon Casas and Pere Romeu on a Tandem in 1897 specifically for the interior of Els Quatre Gats, a bar that was at the center of the Modernisme art movement in Barcelona. It depicts Casas and Pere Romeu, one of the promoters of Els Quatre Gats, on a tandem bicycle against the Barcelona skyline. Casas is seen in profile with his pipe, while Romeu looks directly at the viewer. Although painted on canvas, the composition has the graphic quality of a huge poster with its bold drawing and simplified forms, reflecting the fact that the artist was a skilled poster designer and illustrator.

The original inscription in Catalan on the right side of the painting, which was later cut off, read "to ride a bicycle, you can't go with your back straight." The message described the attitude of the bar founders (two of whom are depicted here), that to make progress, you must break with tradition, as was done at Els Quatre Gats. In 1901, this painting was replaced with another large composition by Casas, entitled Ramon Casas and Pere Romeu in an Automobile, in which the tandem bicycle has given way to a car, symbolizing the new century. When reproductions of the two paintings appeared in the magazine Pel & Ploma, they were referred to as The End of the 19th Century and The Beginning of the 20th Century, respectively.

== Exhibition history ==
Year	Museum or gallery	City	Title	Reference
1897-1900	Els Quatre Gats	Barcelona		
1958	Palau de la Virreina	Barcelona	Ramon Casas	
1969	Casón del Buen Retiro	Madrid	El Modernismo en España	
1970	Barcelona Museum of Contemporary Art	Barcelona	El Modernismo en España	
1978	Princeton University Art Museum	Princeton	Els Quatre Gats. Art in Barcelona around 1900	
1978	Smithsonian Institution	Washington, D.C.	Els Quatre Gats. Art in Barcelona around 1900	
1979	Palazzo Medici Riccardi	Florence	Picasso e dintorni. I Quattro Gatti. Il Modernismo catalano	
1980	Palacio de Velázquez	Madrid	Cien años de cultura catalana 1880–1980	
1981–1982	Saló del Tinell	Barcelona	Picasso i Barcelona 1881–1981	
1982	Museum of Modern Art, Madrid	Madrid	Picasso i Barcelona 1881–1981	
1982	Museu Picasso	Barcelona	Picasso i Barcelona 1881–1981	
1982	Palau de la Virreina	Barcelona	Exposicion Ramon Casas	
1983	Barcelona Museum of Modern Art	Barcelona	Els Autoretrats del Museu d'Art Modern	
1984	Musée des Beaux-Arts de Bordeaux	Bordeaux	50 ans d'art espagnol 1880–1936	
1985–1986	Hayward Gallery	London	Homage to Barcelona. The city and its art 1888–1936	
1987	Palau de la Virreina	Barcelona	Homage to Barcelona. The city and its art 1888–1936	
1987	The Prefectural Museum of Modern Art	Kobe	Homage to Barcelona. The city and its art 1888–1936	
1987	The Museum of Modern Art, Kamakura	Kamakura	Homage to Barcelona. The city and its art 1888–1936	
1987	Museum of Fine Arts, Gifu	Gifu	Homage to Barcelona. The city and its art 1888–1936	
1990–1991	Barcelona Museum of Modern Art	Barcelona	El Modernisme	
1992	Palau Robert	Barcelona	Art i esport a Catalunya	
1995–1996	Museu Picasso	Barcelona	Picasso i els 4 Gats. La clau de la modernitat	
2001	National Art Museum of Catalonia	Barcelona	Ramon Casas. El pintor del moderinsme	
2001	Mapfre Vida Cultural Foundation	Madrid	Ramon Casas. El pintor del moderinsme	
2001	Galeries Nationales du Grand Palais	Paris	Paris Barcelone de Gaudi a Miró	
2002	Museu Picasso	Barcelona	Paris Barcelona 1888–1937	
2006–2007	Cleveland Museum of Art	Cleveland	Barcelona and Modernity: Picasso, Gaudi, Miró, and Dalí	
2007	Metropolitan Museum of Art	New York	Barcelona and Modernity: Picasso, Gaudi, Miró, and Dalí	
