= Els Quatre Gats =

Café in Barcelona, Spain

Coordinates: 41°23′08″N 2°10′24″E

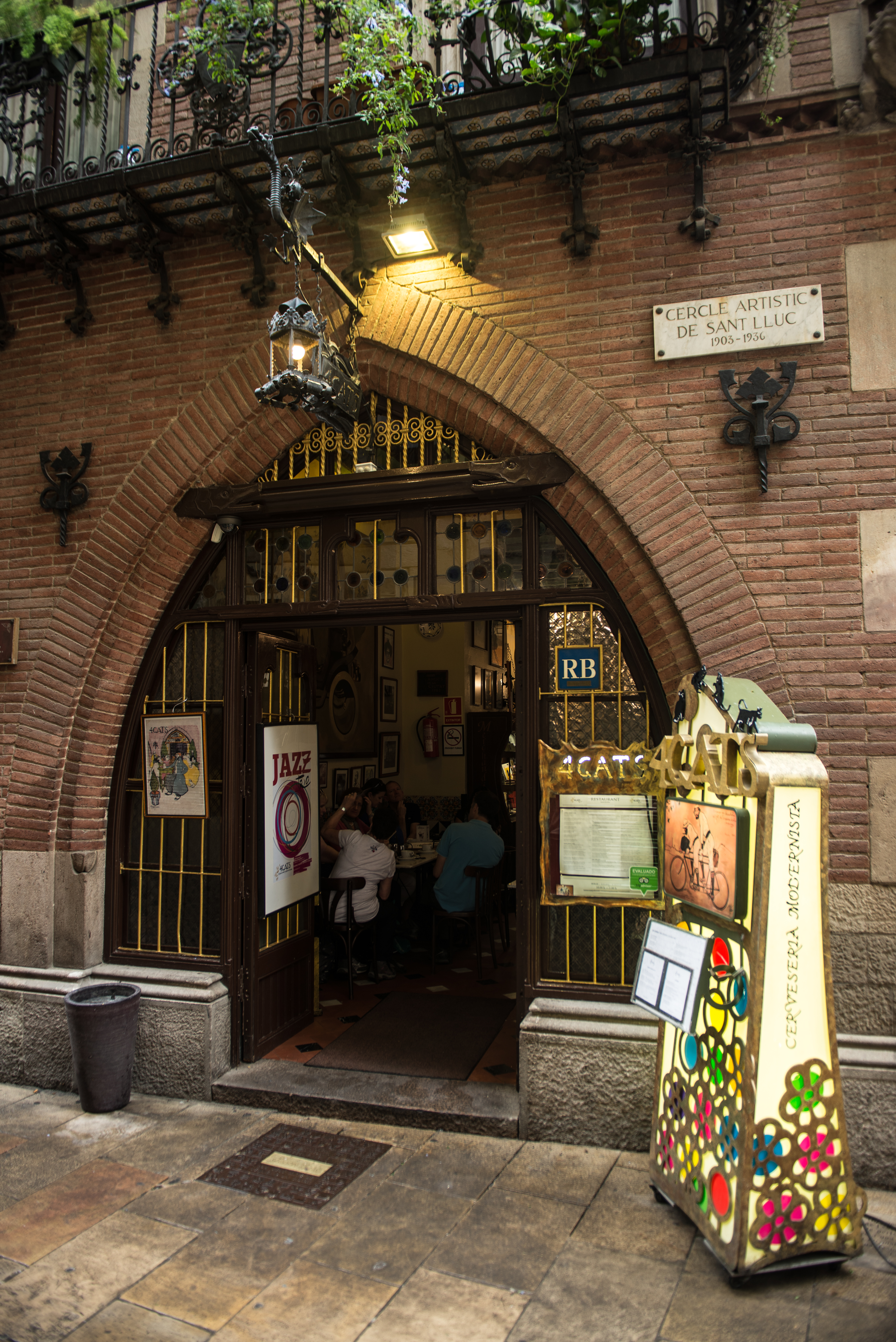
Entrance of Els Quatre Gats.

Els Quatre Gats (Catalan for 'The Four Cats'; pronounced [əls ˈkwatɾə ˈɣats]) is a café in Barcelona, Catalonia, Spain, that famously became a popular meeting place for renowned artists throughout the modernist period in Catalonia, known as Modernisme. The café opened on 12 June 1897 in the celebrated Casa Martí, and served as a hostel, bar and cabaret until it eventually became a central meeting point for Barcelona's most prominent modernist figures, such as Pablo Picasso, Ramon Casas i Carbó, and Antoni Gaudi i Cornet. The bar closed due to financial difficulties in June 1903, but was reopened and eventually restored to its original condition in 1989.

== History ==
Pere Romeu had the idea to open Els Quatre Gats, drawing inspiration from a French café called Le Chat Noir, where he had previously worked. Le Chat Noir translates to "The Black Cat" in English, but the name is a little different in Catalan. Els Quatre Gats means "The Four Cats," which is derived from a Catalan expression which means "only a few people." The phrase is usually used to describe people who are a bit strange, or perceived as outsiders. Romeu was taken with this Parisian café and decided to model the décor of his café after it. Romeu was financially supported by three of his friends, Ramon Casas, Santiago Rusiñol and Miquel Utrillo, three major modernist Spanish artists of the time. Casas even painted something specifically for the interior of the café, his famous painting called Ramon Casas and Pere Romeu on a Tandem. The painting depicts both Casas and Romeu riding on a bike together with the Barcelona skyline visible in the background. On the right side of the painting there is an inscription which reads, "To ride a bike, you can't go with your back straight." This quote reflects the attitude of the founders that in order to make progress and make something great, you must break tradition. As the original is in a museum, a copy of the painting now hangs in the café.

The café opened on 12 June 1897 in Casa Martí, an important modernist building designed by the Barcelona architect Josep Puig i Cadafalch. The four men wanted the café to be known not only for having good food and drink, but also, as Rusiñol described it, for having "food of the spirit," or an ambiance where artists could meet to discuss their work and the news of the day. The bar was also characterized by piano music and quickly became a popular haunt for important modernist and bohemian artists of the day, including Casas and Rusiñol, but also architects such as Antoní Gaudí and sculptors such as Julio González. As the café increasingly grew more popular among young modernist artists, it began to frequently play host to other intellectuals from the new Bohemian and modernist Barcelona, who attended performances, concerts, art exhibitions and literary gatherings within its walls. In 1899, at 17 years old, Pablo Picasso began frequenting Els Quatre Gats and even held his first solo exhibition in the main room. The poster that now stands on the corner of the street outside the café was designed by Picasso.

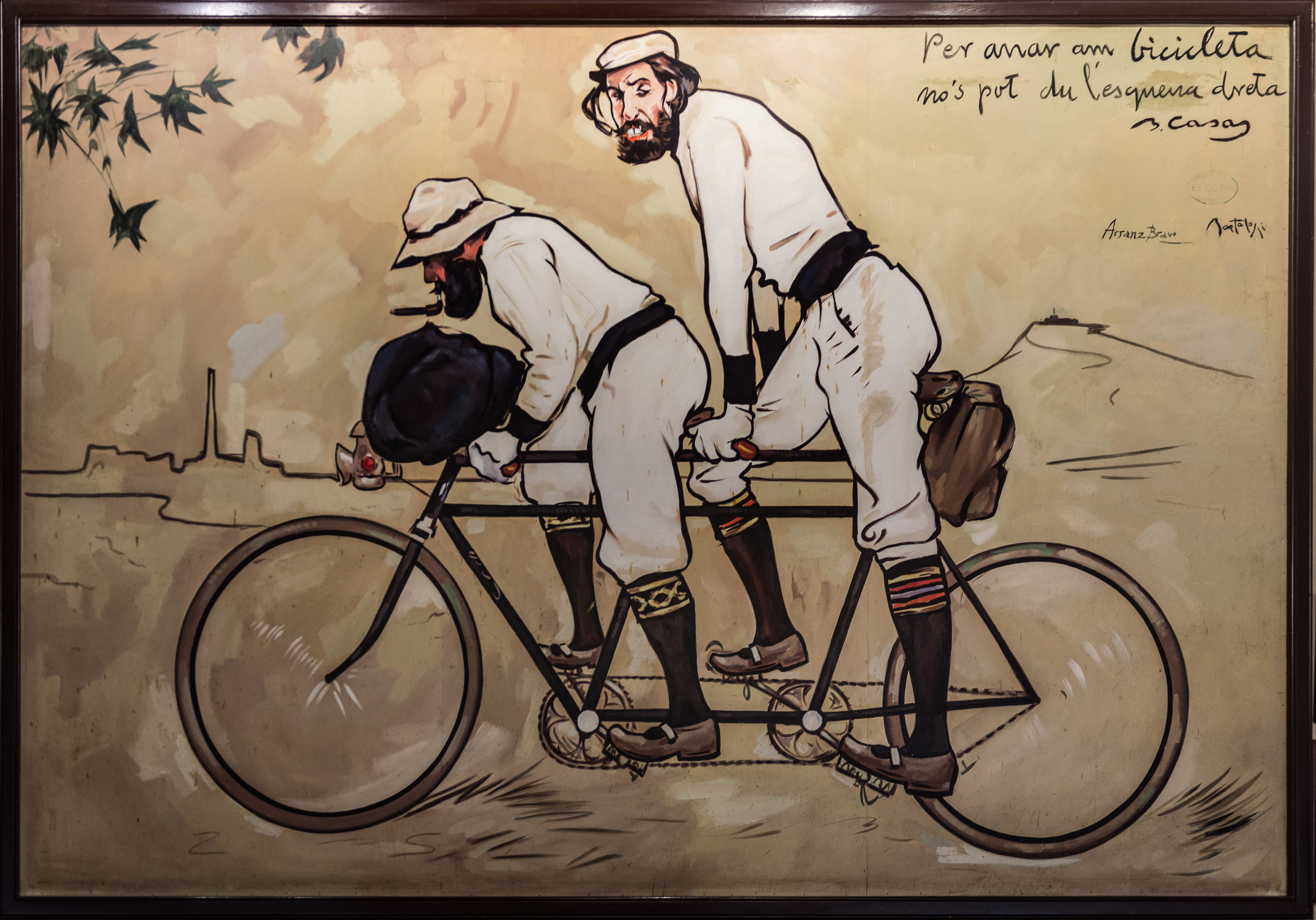
Ramon Casas and Pere Romeu on a Tandem

Unfortunately, Romeu was not a very savvy businessman and would often allow his friends to order food at discounted prices, sometimes not requiring them to pay at all. Because of this, Els Quatre Gats went out of business in June 1903. The legacy of the café lived on, however, thanks to the efforts of Ramon Casas and Miguel Utrillo. The two men continued to write a literary review inspired by the café for five years after the café closed. Eventually, after the death of Francisco Franco and the arrival of democracy in Spain in the 1970s, three prominent businessmen, Pere Moto, Ricard Alsina, and Ana Verdeguer began efforts to restore the café to its original glory with a new proposal to the Spanish government. The proposal made the argument that the restoration of the café would benefit the cultural environment of Barcelona, which was of great importance after the oppression the land of Catalonia had suffered under Franco. In 1978, the famous café was finally reopened to the public and Casa Martí was restored to its former glory in 1991.

== List of famous patrons ==
- Gustavo Barceló (bibliophile)
- Ramon Casas (artist)
- Santiago Rusiñol (artist)
- Rubén Dario (poet)
- Pablo Picasso (artist)
- Isaac Albéniz (pianist and composer)
- Enric Granados (pianist and composer)
- Lluís Millet (musician and composer)
- Antoni Gaudí (architect)
- Ricard Opisso (cartoonist, illustrator and painter)
- Miquel Utrillo (artist)
- Julio González (sculptor)
- Lluïsa Vidal (artist)
- Joaquin Torres-Garcia (artist)

== Modernist aspects of the building ==
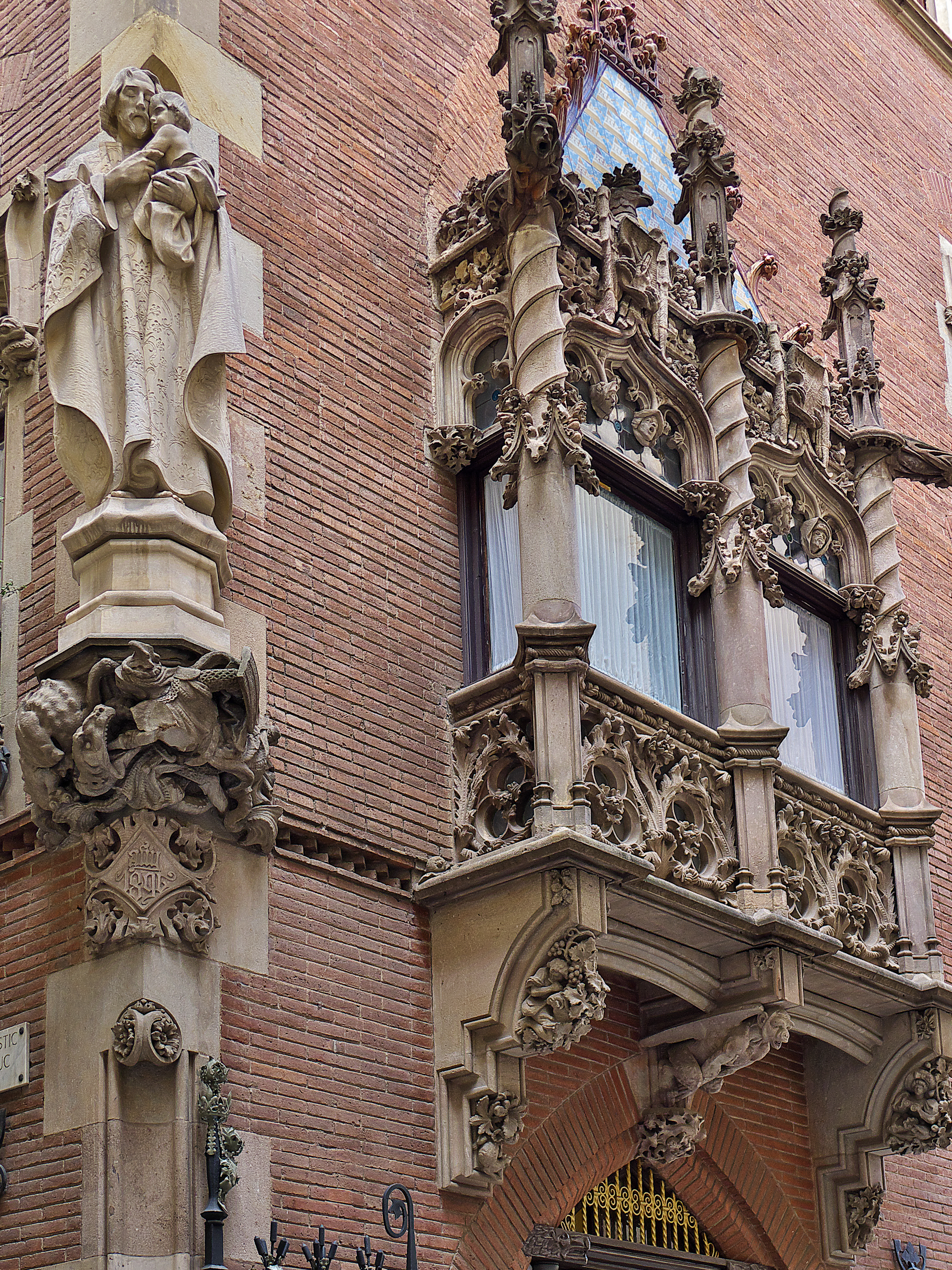
Facade of Casa Martí, Sculpture of Saint Joseph

Els Quatre Gats is located on the ground floor of the famous modernist building Casa Marti, designed by Josep Puig i Cadafalch in 1896. The café appears to be situated in a medieval castle, with the façade where the entrance of the café is located drawing inspiration from the European Gothic style. The overall style of the building appears more Northern European than Catalan. However, the building is decorated with the classic ornamental elements of Catalan Art-Nouveau, or Catalan modernism. These elements include the iron elements of the building, the stained glass windows and the sculptures found on the corner of the building. The wrought iron work is a product of Manuel Ballerín, and the sculpture of the narrative capitals is by famous Barcelona sculptor Eusebi Arnau while the sculpture of Saint Joseph is by Josep Llimona, another famous Spanish sculptor. Unfortunately, the statue of Saint Joseph is a reproduction of the original, as the original work was destroyed during the Spanish Civil War.

The balconies of the building were designed in the Catalan Art-Nouveau style, a name which was given to the modernist movement within Barcelona and Catalonia itself. This type of architectural style can also be seen depicted in the stained-glass windows, which are contained in large pointed arches of the gothic style of architecture. The furniture of the building was actually funded by Ramón Casa, but is of a medieval architectural style rather than modernist. The mixture of all of these distinct types of architectural styles, such as gothic, medieval and the many modernist elements of Catalan Art-Nouveau that can be found on the façade of the building, are what makes this building an incredible example of modernist architecture. The building was declared an Asset of Natural Cultural Interest on the ninth of January in 1976.

== Literary review ==
In 1899, a literary review of the same name as the café was published for the first time. The magazine contained articles from many different modernists, with the majority written by two of the founders of the café, Ramon Casas and Miguel Utrillo. The review, much like the café itself, was modeled after Le Chat Noir, and would become the artistic and literary platform of Catalan modernism. The purpose of this literary review was to inform the general public of Barcelona about the thoughts and ideas of the Barcelona modernist artists and to talk frankly about their works. The articles in the magazine were both serious and humorous, and the majorities were written with the intention of defending the modernist's works of art to the people of Barcelona. After the review ended, publishing only fifteen issues, the new magazine Pel y Ploma continued the tradition of Els Quatre Gats. Pel y Ploma, in English Hair and Feather, ran from 1899 until 1903 and then was replaced with a third magazine, Forma. Ramon Casas and Miguel Utrillo continued to be main contributors to the two magazines that followed the original Els Quatre Gats, and kept the legacy of the café alive after it closed down. The third magazine lacked subscriptions and was ended in 1908.
