= Antoni Gaudí =

Spanish (Catalan) architect (1852–1926)

Venerable Antoni Gaudí
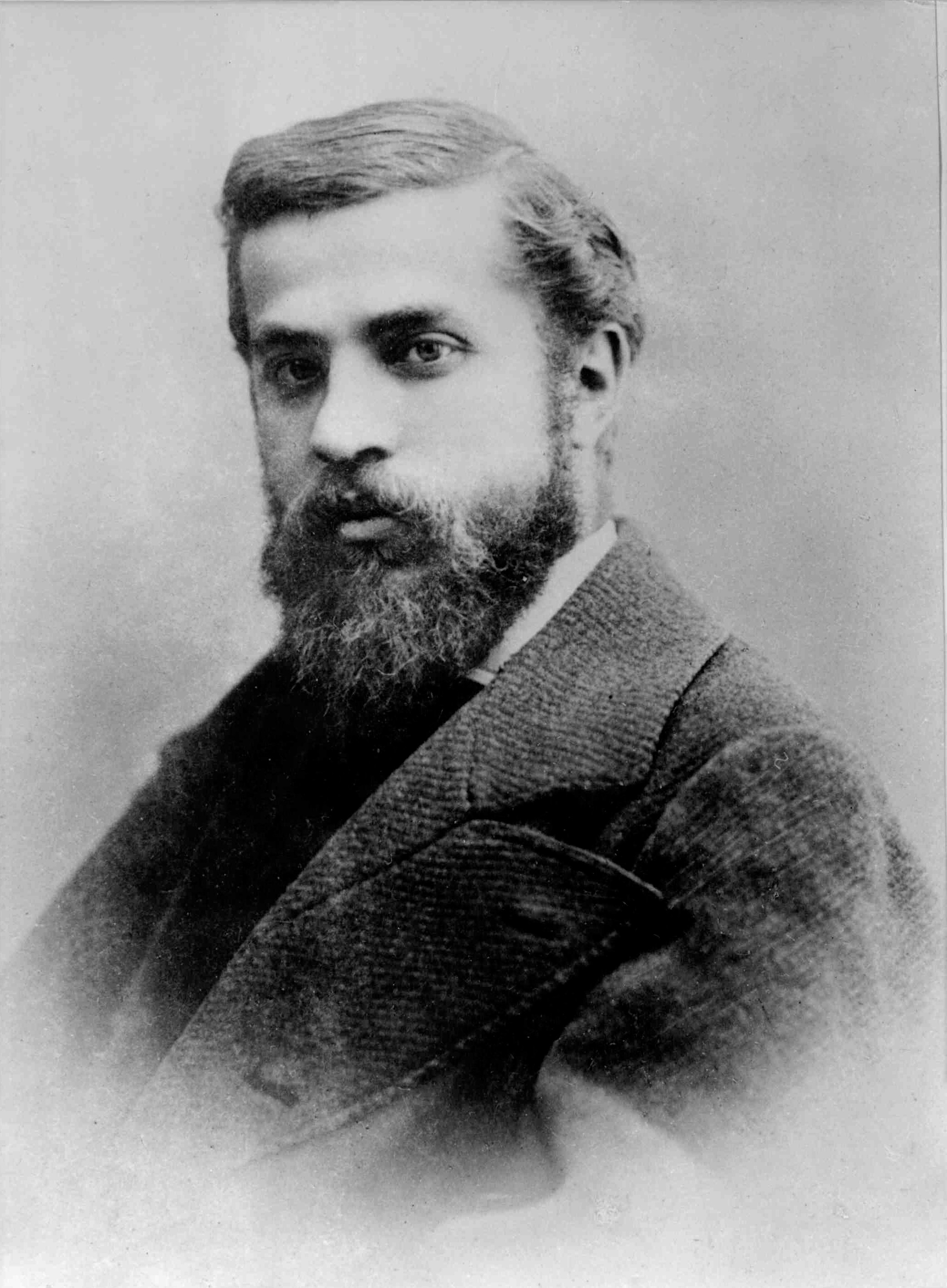
- Gaudí in 1878, by Pau Audouard
- Born: Antoni Gaudí i Cornet; 25 June 1852; Reus or Riudoms, Catalonia, Spain
- Died: 10 June 1926 (aged 73); Barcelona, Catalonia, Spain
- Burial place: Sagrada Família, Barcelona
- Occupations: Architect; designer
- Notable work: Sagrada Família; Casa Milà; Casa Batlló; Park Güell; Church of Colònia Güell
- Movement: Modernisme
- Venerated in: Catholic Church
- Website: sagradafamilia.org; parkguell.barcelona; casabatllo.es

Antoni Gaudí i Cornet (/ɡaʊˈdi/ gow-DEE or /ˈɡaʊdi/ GOW-dee, Catalan: [ənˈtɔni ɣəwˈði j kuɾˈnɛt]; (Note: In isolation, Gaudí is pronounced [ɡəwˈði].) 25 June 1852 – 10 June 1926) was a Spanish architect and designer, widely known as the greatest exponent of Catalan Modernisme. Gaudí's works have a sui generis style, with most located in Barcelona, including his magnum opus, the Sagrada Família church.

Gaudí's work was influenced by his passions in life: architecture, nature, and religion. He considered every detail of his creations and combined crafts such as ceramics, stained glass, wrought ironwork forging, and carpentry. He introduced new techniques in the treatment of materials, such as trencadís which used waste ceramic pieces.

Influenced by neo-Gothic art and Oriental techniques, Gaudí became part of the Modernista movement, which peaked in the late 19th and early 20th centuries. His work eventually transcended mainstream Modernisme, developing into a unique style inspired by natural forms. Gaudí rarely drew detailed plans, preferring to create three-dimensional scale models and mold the details as he conceived them.

Gaudí's work enjoys global admiration and ongoing study. His masterpiece, the still-incomplete Sagrada Família, is the most-visited monument in Spain. Between 1984 and 2005, seven of his works were declared UNESCO World Heritage Sites.

Gaudí's Catholic faith intensified throughout his life, and religious imagery appears in many of his works. This earned him the nickname "God's Architect". His cause for canonisation was opened in the Archdiocese of Barcelona in 2003. Pope Francis authorised Gaudi's declaration as Venerable in April 2025.

== Life ==
=== The beginning ===
Gaudí was born on 25 June 1852 in Reus, or possibly Riudoms, (Note: There is a certain controversy about whether Gaudí was born in Reus or Riudoms, his father's village near Reus. Most sources tend towards Reus, according to biographer Gijs Van Hensbergen, who also states that Gaudí's "baptismal papers leave little room for doubt as to where ... he was born". Van Hensbergen traces the origin of the uncertainty to later equivocation by Gaudí himself, as does the architect and historian Joan Bassegoda, who, writing in 2002, said: "Throughout the early part of his life Gaudí named Reus as his birthplace in all his identity documents, but beginning in 1915 he declared himself Riudoms-born. His dissatisfaction with the rejection of his proposal to restore the Misericordia sanctuary of Reus at around this time may have been the cause of his decision to claim Riudoms as his birthplace.") to coppersmith Francesc Gaudí i Serra (1813–1906) and Antònia Cornet i Bertran (1819–1876). He was the youngest of five children, and far outlived the other two who survived to adulthood: Rosa (1844–1879) and Francesc (1851–1876). Gaudí's family originated in the Auvergne region in southern France. One of his ancestors, Joan Gaudí, a hawker, moved to Catalonia in the 17th century. Possible derivations of the Gaudí family name include Gaudy or Gaudin.

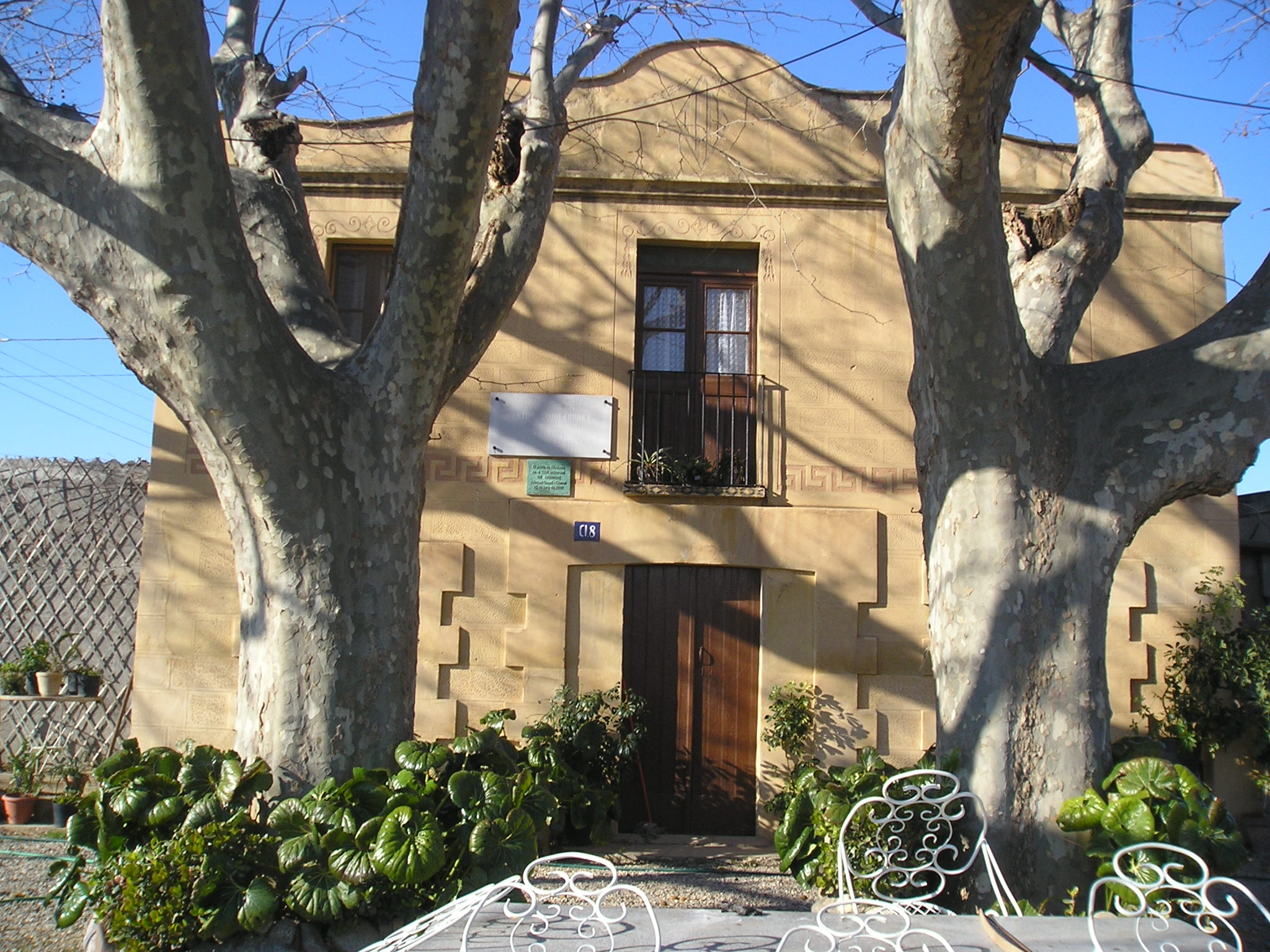
El Mas de la Calderera, home of the Gaudí family in Riudoms

Gaudí's exact birthplace is uncertain, with scant supporting documents. Controversy has arisen as to whether he was born in Reus or Riudoms, two neighbouring municipalities of the Baix Camp region. Most of Gaudí's identification documents gave Reus as his birthplace. From 1915, Gaudí stated on various occasions that he was born in Riudoms, his paternal family's village; this alteration in his stated natal village may have stemmed from Gaudí's later displeasure with Reus. Gaudí was baptised in the church of Sant Pere Apòstol in Reus the day after his birth under the name "Antoni Plàcid Guillem Gaudí i Cornet".

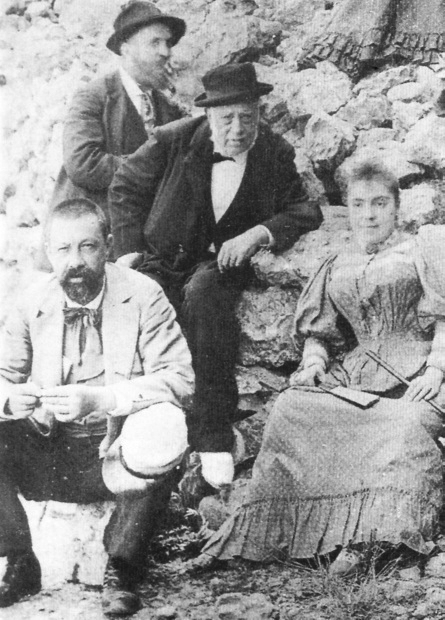
Gaudí (in the background) with his father (centre), his niece Rosa and doctor Santaló during a visit to Montserrat (1904)

Young Gaudí suffered from poor health, including rheumatism, which may have contributed to his reticent and reserved character. These health concerns and the hygienist theories of Sebastian Kneipp contributed to Gaudí's early decision to adopt vegetarianism. His religious faith and strict vegetarianism led him to undertake lengthy and severe fasts. These fasts were often unhealthy and occasionally, as in 1894, led to life-threatening illness.

=== Schooling and later studies ===
Gaudí attended a nursery school run by Francesc Berenguer, whose son, also called Francesc, later became one of Gaudí's main assistants. He enrolled in the Piarists school in Reus where he displayed artistic talent via drawings for a seminar called El Arlequín ('the Harlequin'). During this time, he worked as an apprentice in the Vapor Nou textile mill in Reus. In 1868, he moved to Barcelona to study teaching in the Convent del Carme. As an adolescent, Gaudí became interested in utopian socialism and, together with his fellow students Eduard Toda i Güell and Josep Ribera i Sans, planned a restoration of the Poblet Monastery that would have transformed it into a Utopian phalanstère.

Between 1875 and 1878, Gaudí completed his compulsory military service in the infantry regiment in Barcelona as a Military Administrator. Most of his service was spent on sick leave, enabling him to continue his studies. His poor health kept him from having to fight in the Third Carlist War, which lasted from 1872 to 1876. In 1876, Gaudí's mother died at age 57, and his brother Francesc, who had just graduated as a physician, died aged 25. During this time Gaudí studied architecture at the Llotja School and the Barcelona Higher School of Architecture, graduating in 1878. To finance his studies, Gaudí worked as a draughtsman for various architects and constructors such as Leandre Serrallach, Joan Martorell, Emili Sala Cortés, Francisco de Paula del Villar y Lozano and Josep Fontserè. In addition to his architecture classes, he studied French, history, economics, philosophy, and aesthetics. His grades were average and he occasionally failed courses. When handing him his degree, Elies Rogent, director of Barcelona Architecture School, said: "We have given this academic title either to a fool or a genius. Time will show." Gaudí, when receiving his degree, reportedly told his friend, the sculptor Llorenç Matamala, with his ironical sense of humour, "Llorenç, they're saying I'm an architect now." Time spent outdoors, particularly during summer stays in the Gaudí family home Mas de la Calderera, afforded Gaudí the opportunity to study nature. His interest in the natural world led him to join the Centre Excursionista de Catalunya in 1879, when he was 27. The organisation arranged expeditions to explore Catalonia and southern France, often on horseback or on foot, covering up to ten kilometres (6.2 mi) a day.

=== Adulthood and professional work ===
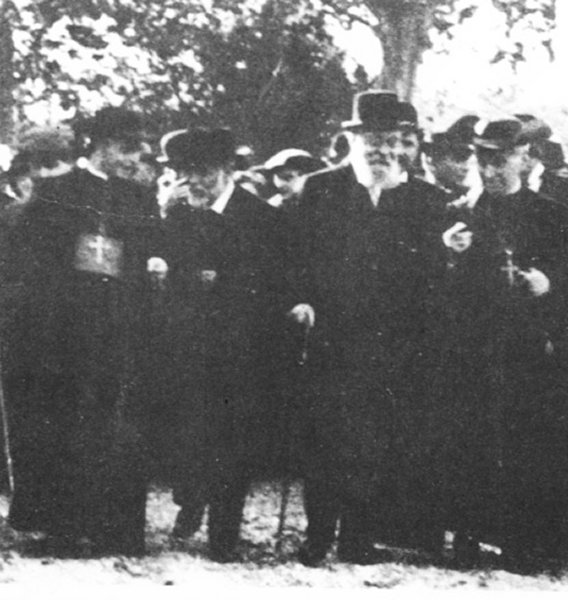
Gaudí and Eusebi Güell on a visit to the Colònia Güell (1910)

Gaudí's first projects were the lampposts he designed for the Plaça Reial in Barcelona, the unfinished Girossi newsstands, and the Cooperativa Obrera Mataronense (Workers' Cooperative of Mataró) building. He gained wider recognition for his first important commission, the Casa Vicens, and subsequently received more significant proposals. At the Paris World's Fair of 1878, Gaudí displayed a wooden showcase he had produced for the glove manufacturer Comella. Its functional and aesthetic modernista design impressed Catalan entrepreneur Eusebi Güell, who then commissioned some of Gaudí's most outstanding work: the Bodegas Güell (wine cellars), the Güell pavilions, the Palau Güell (Güell palace), the Park Güell and the crypt of the church of the Colònia Güell. Gaudí also became a friend of Antonio López, 1st Marquess of Comillas, Güell's father-in-law, for whom he designed "El Capricho" in Comillas, Cantabria, Gaudí designed other buildings in Spain.

In 1883 Gaudí was put in charge of the recently initiated project to build a Barcelona church called the Basílica i Temple Expiatori de la Sagrada Família ('basilica and expiatory church of the holy family', or simply Sagrada Família, 'holy family'). Gaudí completely changed the initial design and imbued it with his own distinctive style. From 1915 until his death, he devoted himself entirely to this project. Given the number of commissions he began receiving, he had to rely on his team to work on multiple projects simultaneously. His team consisted of professionals from all fields of construction. Several of the architects who worked under him became prominent in the field later on, such as Josep Maria Jujol, Joan Rubió, Cèsar Martinell, Francesc Folguera, and Josep Francesc Ràfols. In 1885, Gaudí moved to rural Sant Feliu de Codines to escape the cholera epidemic that was ravaging Barcelona. He lived in Francesc Ullar's house, for whom he designed a dinner table in gratitude.

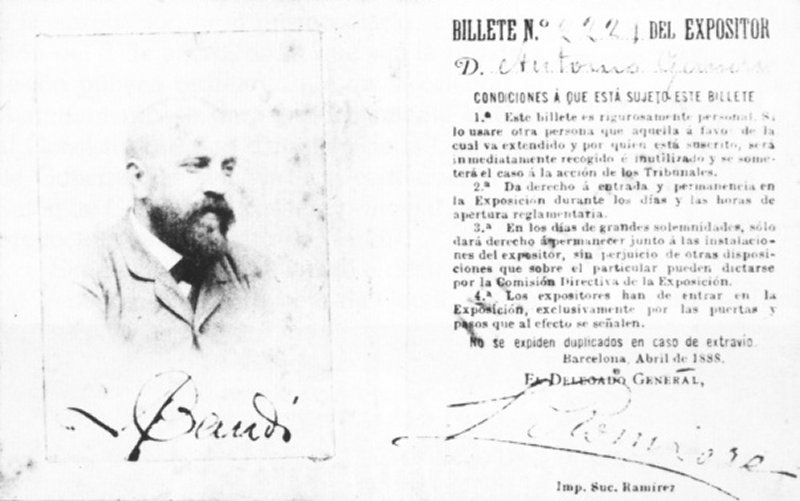
Gaudí's exposition licence at the Exposición Universal de Barcelona, 1888

The 1888 World Fair was one of the era's major events in Barcelona and represented a key point in the history of the Modernisme movement. Leading architects displayed their best works, including Gaudí, who showcased the building he had designed for the Compañía Trasatlántica (Transatlantic Company). Consequently, he received a commission to restructure the Saló de Cent of the Barcelona City Council, but this project was not constructed. In the early 1890s, Gaudí received two commissions from outside of Catalonia, namely the Episcopal Palace, Astorga, and the Casa Botines in León. These works contributed to Gaudí's growing renown across Spain. In 1891, he travelled to Málaga and Tangiers to examine the site for a project for the Franciscan Catholic Missions that the 2nd marquis of Comillas had requested him to design.

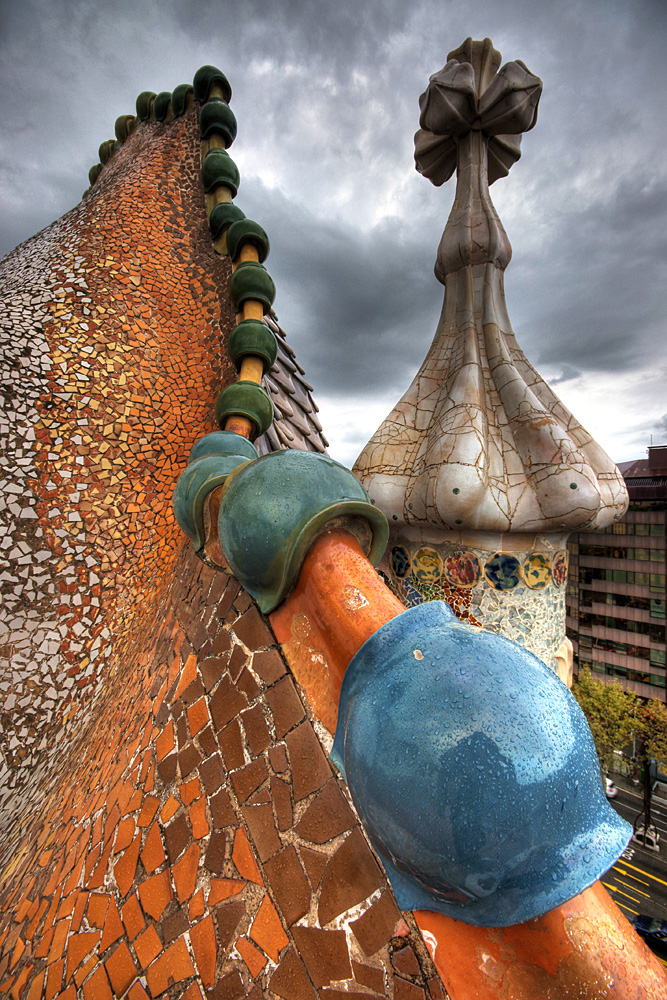
Roof architecture at Casa Batlló

In 1899 Gaudí joined the Cercle Artístic de Sant Lluc ('Saint Luke artists' circle'), a Catholic artistic society founded in 1893 by the bishop Josep Torras i Bages and the brothers Josep and Joan Llimona. He also joined the Lliga Espiritual de la Mare de Déu de Montserrat ('spiritual league of Our Lady of Montserrat'), another Catholic Catalan organisation. The conservative and religious character of his political thought was closely linked to his defence of the cultural identity of the Catalan people.

At the beginning of the century, Gaudí was working on numerous projects simultaneously. They reflected his shift to a more personal style inspired by nature. In 1900, he received an award for the best building of the year from the Barcelona City Council for his Casa Calvet. During the first decade of the century Gaudí dedicated himself to projects like the Casa Figueras (better known as Bellesguard), the Park Güell, an unsuccessful urbanisation project, and the restoration of the Cathedral of Palma de Mallorca, for which he visited Mallorca several times. Between 1904 and 1910 he constructed the Casa Batlló and the Casa Milà, two of his most emblematic works.

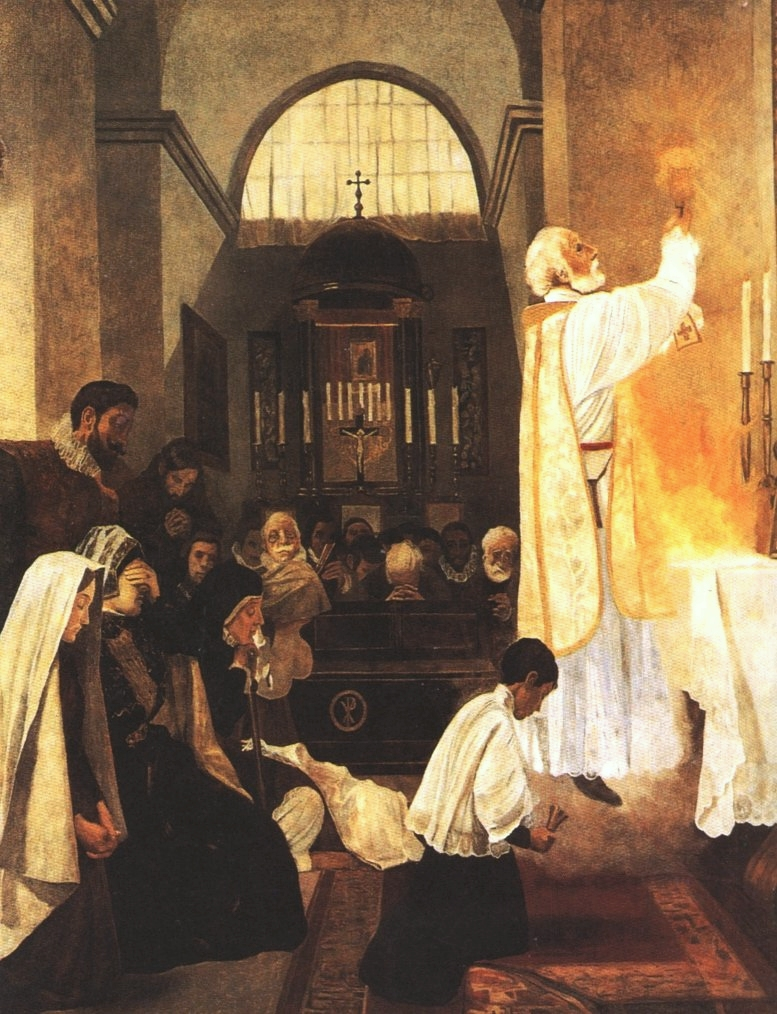
Saint Philip Neri celebrating the Holy Mass by Joan Llimona (church of Sant Felip Neri, Barcelona). Gaudí was the model for Saint Philip Neri's face.

As a result of Gaudí's increasing fame, in 1902 the painter Joan Llimona chose Gaudí's features to represent Saint Philip Neri in the paintings for the aisle of the Sant Felip Neri church in Barcelona. Together with Joan Santaló, son of his friend the physician Pere Santaló, he unsuccessfully founded a wrought iron manufacturing company the same year.

After moving to Barcelona, Gaudí frequently changed his address: As a student he lived in residences, generally in the area of the Gothic Quarter; when he started his career he moved among rented flats in the Eixample area. Finally, in 1906, he settled in the house in Güell Park that he owned and which had been constructed by his assistant Francesc Berenguer as a showcase property for the estate. It has since become the Gaudí Museum. There he lived with his father (who died in 1906 at the age of 93) and his niece Rosa Egea Gaudí (who died in 1912 at age 36). He lived in the house until 1925, several months before his death, when he began residing inside the workshop of the Sagrada Família. The Tragic Week in 1909 had a profound impact on Gaudí's personality. Gaudí remained in his house in Güell Park during this turbulent period. The anticlerical atmosphere and attacks on churches and convents caused Gaudí to worry for the safety of the Sagrada Família, but the building escaped damage.

In 1910, an exhibition in the Grand Palais of Paris was devoted to his work, during the annual salon of the Société des Beaux-Arts (Fine Arts Society) of France. Gaudí participated on the invitation of count Güell, displaying a series of pictures, plans and plaster scale models of several of his works. Although he participated hors concours, he received good reviews from the French press. A large part of this exposition could be seen the following year at the I Salón Nacional de Arquitectura that took place in the municipal exhibition hall of El Buen Retiro in Madrid.

During the Paris exposition in May 1910, Gaudí spent a holiday in Vic, where he designed two basalt lampposts and wrought iron for the Plaça Major of Vic in honour of Jaume Balmes's centenary. The following year he resided as a convalescent in Puigcerdà while suffering from tuberculosis. During this time he conceived the idea for the façade of the Passion of the Sagrada Família. Due to ill health he prepared a will at the office of the notary Ramon Cantó i Figueres on 9 June, but later recovered.

The decade from 1910 was hard for Gaudí. During this decade, the architect experienced the deaths of his niece Rosa in 1912 and his main collaborator Francesc Berenguer in 1914; a severe economic crisis which paralysed work on the Sagrada Família in 1915; the 1916 death of his friend Josep Torras i Bages, bishop of Vic; the 1917 disruption of work at the Colònia Güell; and the 1918 death of his friend and patron Eusebi Güell. Perhaps because of these tragedies he devoted himself entirely to the Sagrada Família from 1915, taking refuge in his work. Gaudí confessed to his collaborators:

My good friends are dead; I have no family and no clients, no fortune nor anything. Now I can dedicate myself entirely to the Church.

Gaudí dedicated the last years of his life entirely to the "Cathedral of the Poor", as it was commonly known, for which he took alms in order to continue. Apart from his dedication to this cause, he participated in few other activities, the majority of which were related to his Catholic faith: in 1916 he participated in a course about Gregorian chant at the Palau de la Música Catalana taught by the Benedictine monk Gregori M. Sunyol.

=== Death ===
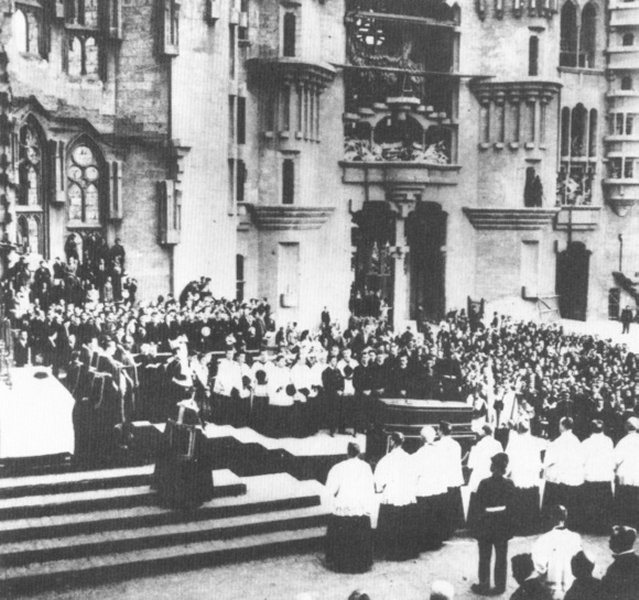
Gaudí's funeral (12 June 1926)

On 7 June 1926, Gaudí took his daily walk to the Sant Felip Neri church for his habitual prayer and confession. While walking along the Gran Via de les Corts Catalanes between Girona and Bailén streets, he was struck by a passing number 30 tram and lost consciousness. Assumed to be a beggar, the unconscious Gaudí did not receive immediate aid. Eventually passers-by transported him in a taxi to the Santa Creu Hospital, where he received rudimentary care.

By the time that the chaplain of the Sagrada Família, Mosén Gil Parés, recognised him on the following day, Gaudí's condition had deteriorated too severely to benefit from additional treatment. Gaudí died on 10 June 1926 at age 73. A large crowd gathered to bid farewell in the chapel of Our Lady of Mount Carmel in the crypt of the Sagrada Família. His gravestone bears this inscription:

Latin: Antonius Gaudí Cornet. Reusensis. Annos natus LXXIV, vitae exemplaris vir, eximiusque artifex, mirabilis operis hujus, templi auctor, pie obiit Barcinone die X Junii MCMXXVI, hinc cineres tanti hominis, resurrectionem mortuorum expectant. R.I.P.

[Antoni Gaudí Cornet. From Reus. At the age of 74, a man of exemplary life, and an extraordinary craftsman, the author of this marvelous work, the church, died piously in Barcelona on the tenth day of June 1926; henceforward the ashes of so great a man await the resurrection of the dead. May he rest in peace.]

== Personal life ==
Gaudí devoted his life entirely to his profession, remaining single. He is reported to have been attracted to only one woman—Josefa Moreu, teacher at the Mataró Cooperative, in 1884—who did not reciprocate. His niece disputed this, saying, "He didn't even look at women." Thereafter Gaudí took refuge in his Catholic faith. Gaudí is often depicted as unsociable and unpleasant, a man of gruff reactions and arrogant gestures. However, those who were close to him described him as friendly and polite, pleasant to talk to and faithful to friends. Among these, his patrons Eusebi Güell and the bishop of Vic, Josep Torras i Bages, stand out, as well as writers Joan Maragall and Jacint Verdaguer, physician Pere Santaló and some of his most faithful collaborators, such as Francesc Berenguer and Llorenç Matamala.

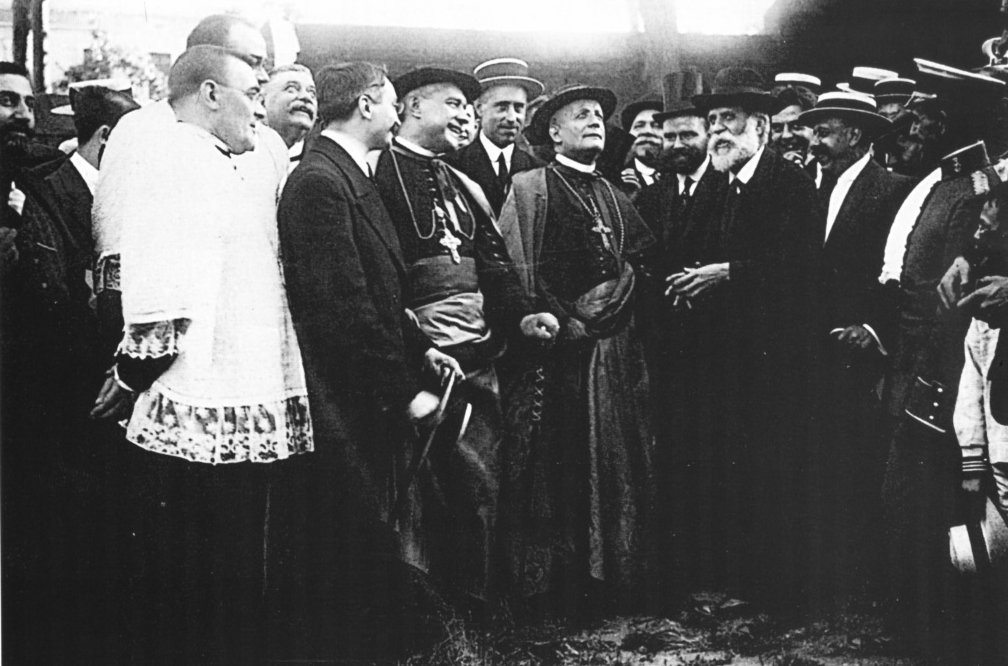
Gaudí shows the Sagrada Família to the Papal nuncio, Cardinal Francesco Ragonesi (1915). On that occasion, Monsegnor Ragonesi considered Gaudí "The Dante of architecture".

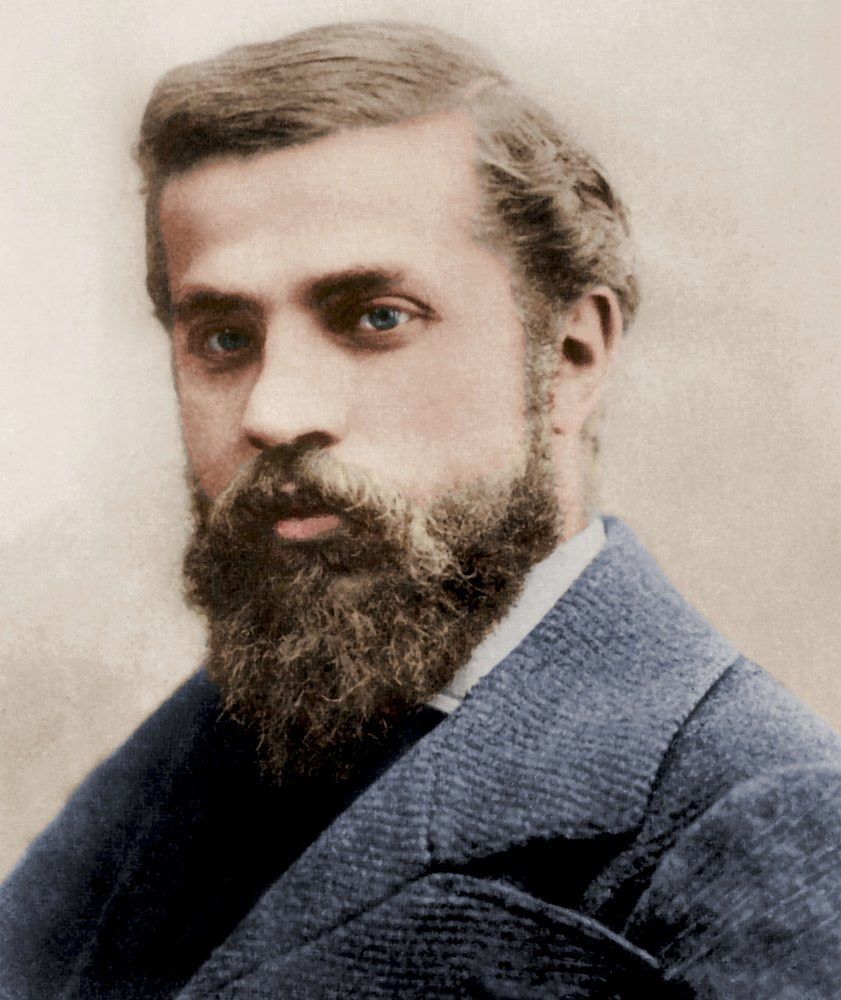
Colorized portrait of Antoni Gaudí at age 26 (1878)

Gaudí's personal appearance—Nordic features, blond hair and blue eyes—and manner of living changed radically over the course of time. As a young man, he dressed like a dandy in costly suits, sporting well-groomed hair and beard, indulging gourmet taste, making frequent visits to the theatre and the opera and visiting his project sites in a horse carriage. The older Gaudí ate frugally, dressed in old, worn-out suits, and neglected his appearance to the extent that sometimes he was taken for a beggar, such as after the accident that caused his death.

Gaudí left hardly any written documents, apart from technical reports of his works required by official authorities, some letters to friends (particularly to Joan Maragall) and a few journal articles. Some quotes collected by his assistants and disciples have been preserved, above all by Josep Francesc Ràfols, Joan Bergós, Cèsar Martinell and Isidre Puig i Boada. The only written document Gaudí left is known as the Manuscrito de Reus (Reus Manuscript) (1873–1878), a kind of student diary in which he collected diverse impressions of architecture and decorating, putting forward his ideas on the subject. Included are an analysis of the Christian church and of his ancestral home, as well as a text about ornamentation and comments on the design of a desk.

=== Catalan identity ===
Gaudí was a proponent of Catalan culture but was not politically active. He refused suggestions by politicians such as Francesc Cambó and Enric Prat de la Riba that he run for deputy. His Catalan identity was less political and more geared towards art, history, culture, and language.

Gaudí had a deep attachment to his native Catalan language. When King of Spain, Alfonso XIII visited the Sagrada Família, Gaudí spoke to him only in Catalan. Gaudí also refused to speak Spanish with Prime Minister Antonio Maura, who, as a native of Mallorca and therefore Catalan-speaking, responded to Gaudí in Catalan, thus breaking protocol in front of the King. Similarly, when philosopher Miguel de Unamuno visited the Sagrada Família, poet Joan Maragall had to translate Gaudí's Catalan tour into Spanish. Gaudí also spoke Catalan in public, although it had been declared illegal by Miguel Primo de Rivera, who tried to suppress Catalan culture.

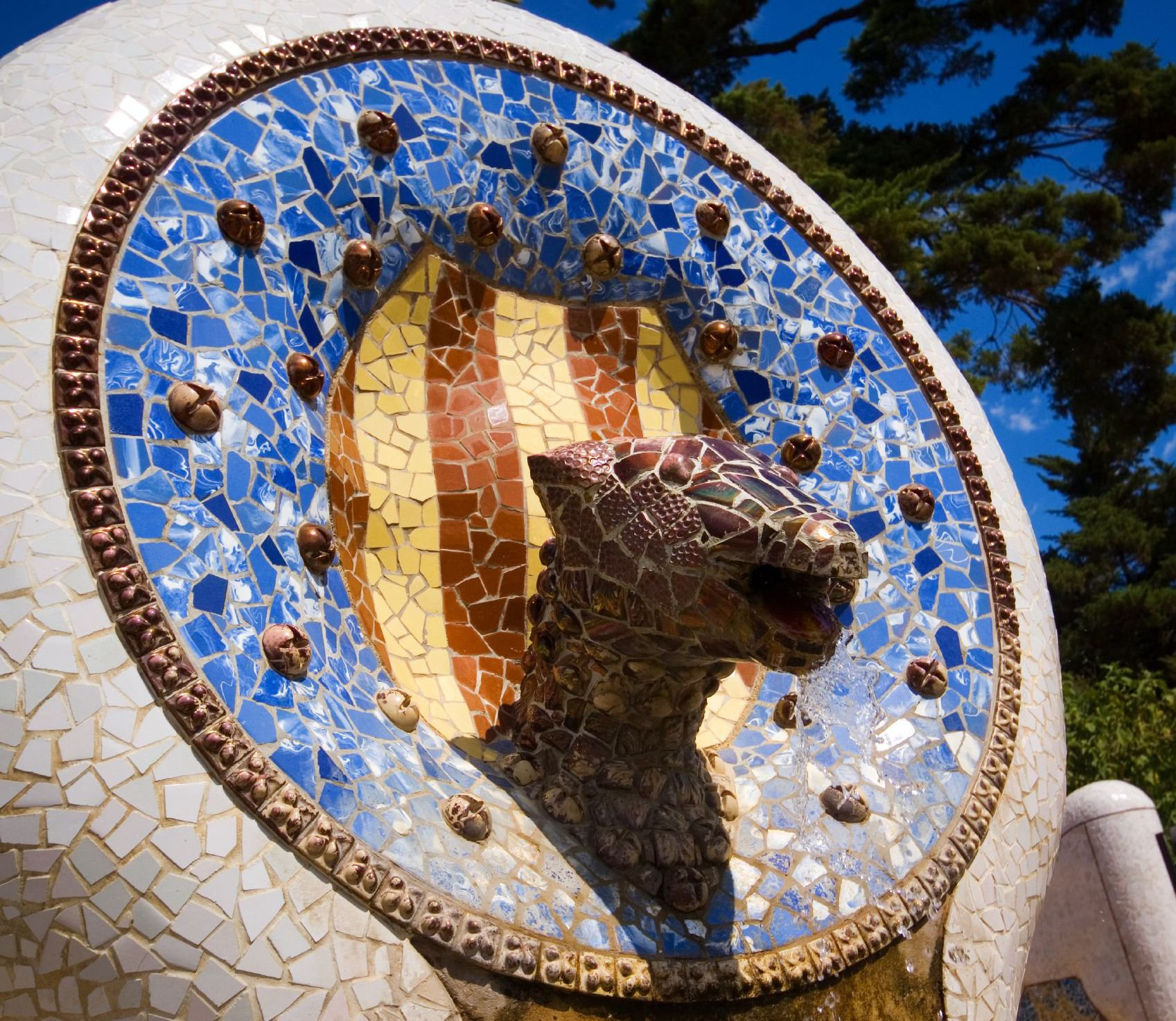
A fountain in Park Güell depicting a snake and the Catalan coat of arms, a common symbol in Gaudí's works

In 1920 he was beaten by police in a riot during the Floral Games celebrations, a Catalan culture celebration.

On 11 September 1924, National Day of Catalonia, he was beaten at a demonstration against the Catalan language ban. He was arrested by the Civil Guard as he travelled to the Basilica of Sant Just i Sant Pastor to attend a mass in memory of Catalonian patriots. Gaudí refused to speak Spanish and kept responding in Catalan, stating that "My profession obliges me to pay my taxes, and I pay them, but not to stop speaking my own language." He was then taken to prison, and was released after paying 50 pesetas bail.

Gaudí incorporated elements of Catalan culture in his works. He was part of the Renaixença, the Catalan Renaissance, a romantic revivalist and cultural movement that aimed at restoring Catalan language and arts combined with an anti-Castilian political "Catalanism". Park Güell, which was commissioned by Catalan patriot Eusebi Güell, was envisioned by Gaudí as a focus of Catalan nationalism and cultural aspirations. Gaudí inserted numerous Catalan motifs in the park, such as a large mosaic with the Catalan flag or the representations of dragons, which were seen as Catalan symbols during the Renaixença because of their connection to Catalan patron saint George. The Park hosted the First Congress of the Catalan Language during construction. Casa Batlló, which is considered among Gaudí's finest works, is known as "House of the Dragon" due to its Georgian symbolism. Sagrada Família is decorated with many words and writings, such as on the towers and doors, and are mainly in Catalan, such as the Lord's Prayer in Catalan on the main doors. The Palau Güell's entrance is decorated with the Catalan coat of arms and a helmet with a phoenix as an alegory to the rebirth of Catalan culture. His project for Barcelona's Muralla de Mar featured shields and names of battles and Catalan admirals. The Torre Bellesguard (1900–1909), former summer palace of King Martin I the Humane, was restored by Gaudí and its spire decorated the Catalan flag and the royal crown. He designed a project (not completed) to crown El Cavall Bernat (a mountain peak) with a viewpoint in the shape of a royal crown and a 20 metres (66 ft) high Catalan coat of arms. The Catalan flag was also present in a banner designed for Our Lady of Mercy of Reus and a monument (not completed) to Catalan politician Enric Prat de la Riba in Castellterçol. Even before he became an architect, he was interested in the history of mediaeval Catalonia, when it was important in Mediterranean politics and history. He joined several Catalan associations, such as Cercle Artístic de Sant Lluc, Lliga Espiritual de la Mare de Déu de Montserrat, Associació Catalanista d'Excursions Científiques. The latter was a group dedicated to preserving and celebrating Catalan art, landscape, culture, and language.

=== Art and Mediterranean heritage ===
Gaudí had a deep appreciation for his native land and great pride in his Mediterranean heritage for his art. He believed Mediterranean people to be endowed with creativity, originality and an innate sense for art and design. Gaudí described the Mediterranean distinction he perceived: "We own the image. Fantasy comes from the ghosts. Fantasy is what people in the North own. We are concrete. The image comes from the Mediterranean area. Orestes knows his way, where Hamlet is torn apart by his doubts." He elaborated this view by stating:

Do not go to the North to seek art and beauty, this is found in the Mediterranean; from its shores ... have come all works of art. In the North and the tropic they do not receive the light at 45 degrees, which best illuminates objects for a perfect viewing; ... Northerners, instead of the object see the ghost of the object; their heads fill with ghosts and in them fantasy predominates. In the North, literature is fantastic and Gothic architecture, too. We in the Mediterranean ... are more imaginative than fantastic, and therefore more appropriate for the visual arts.

Gaudí considered the light of the Mediterranean purer than that of other regions. He stated: "Architecture is, then, Mediterranean because of the harmony of the light. And this light does not exist in the northern countries, which have a sad and horizontal light, nor in the hot climates, where it is vertical."

== Style development ==
=== Early work ===
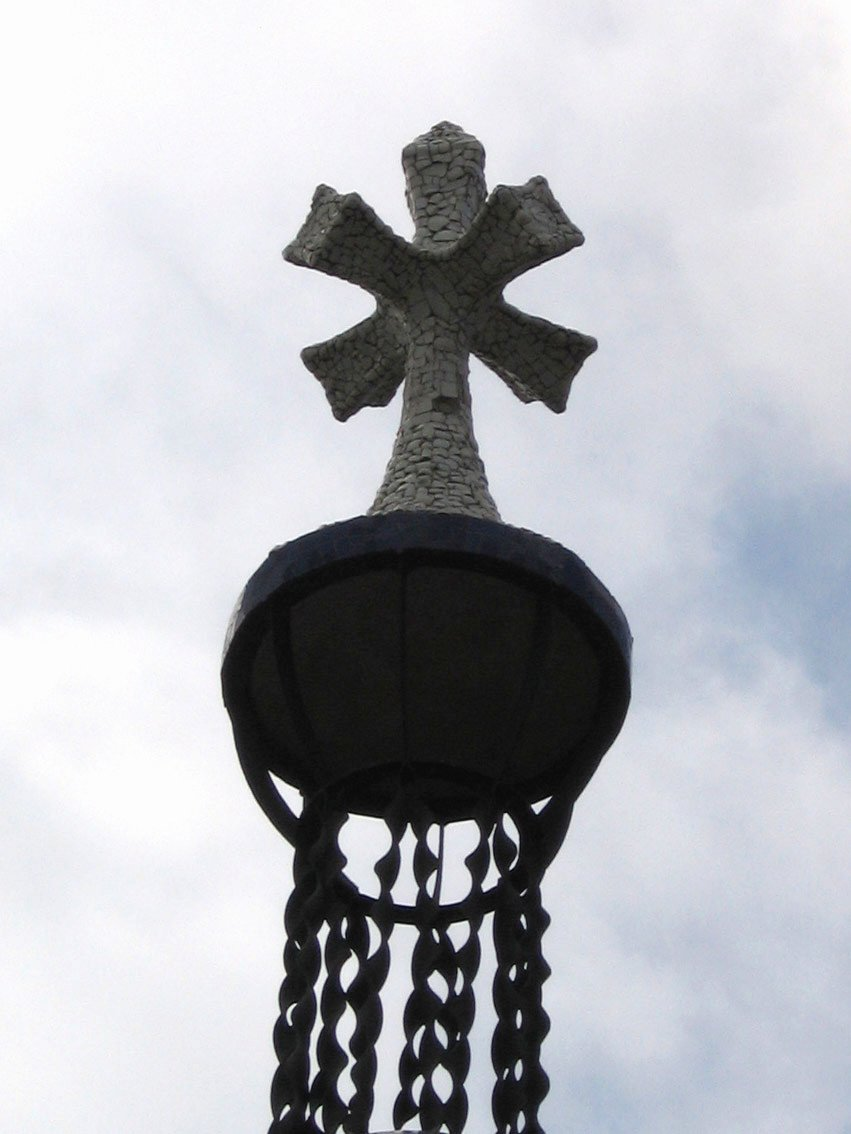
Traditional Gothic cross flower reinterpreted, one of the most typical features of Gaudí's works

Gaudí's professional life continually investigated mechanical building structures. Early on, Gaudí was inspired by oriental arts (India, Persia, Japan) through the study of the historicist architectural theoreticians, such as Walter Pater, John Ruskin, and William Morris. The influence of the Oriental movement can be seen in works like the Capricho, the Güell Palace, the Güell Pavilions and the Casa Vicens.

As a student, Gaudí studied a collection of photographs of Egyptian, Indian, Persian, Mayan, Chinese and Japanese art owned by the School of Architecture. The collection also included Moorish monuments in Spain, which inspired many of his early works. He studied the book Plans, elevations, sections and details of the Alhambra by Owen Jones. He took various structural and ornamental solutions from Nasrid and Mudéjar art, which he used with variations and stylistic freedom. Notably, Gaudí observed of Islamic art its spatial uncertainty, its concept of structures with limitless space; its feeling of sequence, fragmented with holes and partitions, which create a divide without disrupting the feeling of open space by enclosing it with barriers.

=== Gothic revival ===
The Gothic Revival most influenced him, promoted in the latter half of the 19th century by the theoretical works of Eugène Viollet-le-Duc. The French architect called for studying the styles of the past and adapting them in a rational manner, taking into account both structure and design. This influence is reflected in the Teresian College, the Episcopal Palace in Astorga, the Casa Botines and the Bellesguard house as well as in the crypt and the apse of the Sagrada Família.

Nonetheless, for Gaudí the Gothic style was "imperfect", because despite the effectiveness of some of its structural solutions it was an art that had yet to be "perfected". In his own words:

Gothic art is imperfect, only half resolved; it is a style created by the compasses, a formulaic industrial repetition. Its stability depends on constant propping up by the buttresses: it is a defective body held up on crutches. ... The proof that Gothic works are of deficient plasticity is that they produce their greatest emotional effect when they are mutilated, covered in ivy and lit by the moon.

=== Modernisme ===
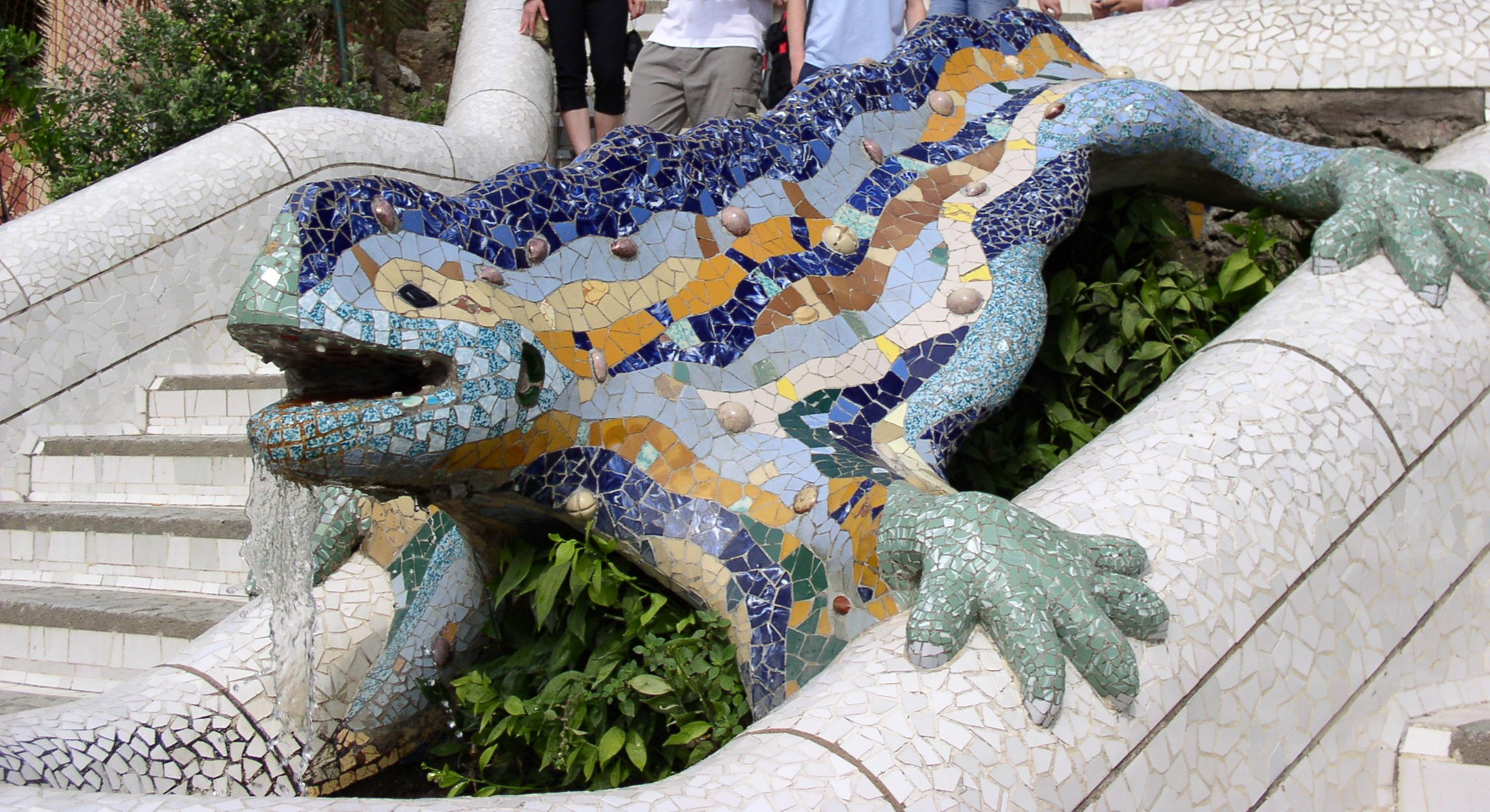
The salamander in Park Güell has become a symbol of Gaudí's work.

After these initial influences, Gaudí moved towards Modernisme, then in its heyday. Modernisme in its earlier stages was inspired by historic architecture. Its practitioners saw its return to the past as a response to the industrial forms imposed by the Industrial Revolution's technological advances. The use of these older styles represented a moral regeneration that allowed the bourgeoisie to identify with values they regarded as their cultural roots. The Renaixença ('rebirth'), the revival of Catalan culture that began in the second half of the 19th century, brought more Gothic forms into the Catalan "national" style that aimed to combine nationalism and cosmopolitanism while at the same time integrating into the European modernizing movement.

Essential features of Modernisme included: an anticlassical language inherited from Romanticism with a tendency to lyricism and subjectivity; the determined connection of architecture with the applied arts and artistic work, yielding an overtly ornamental style; the use of new materials, rich in contrasts, that sought a plastic effect for the whole; a strong sense of optimism and faith in progress that reflected the atmosphere of prosperity of the time, a bourgeois aesthetic.

=== Quest for a new architectural language ===
Gaudí is usually considered the great master of Catalan Modernism, but his works find their main inspiration in geometry and from nature. Gaudí studied natural and anarchic geometric forms, searching for a way to give expression to these forms in architecture. Some of his inspirations came from visits to the mountain of Montserrat, the caves of Mallorca, the saltpetre caves in Collbató, the Fraguerau gorge in the Prades Mountains behind Reus, the Pareis mountain in the north of Mallorca and Sant Miquel del Fai in Bigues i Riells.

==== Geometrical forms ====
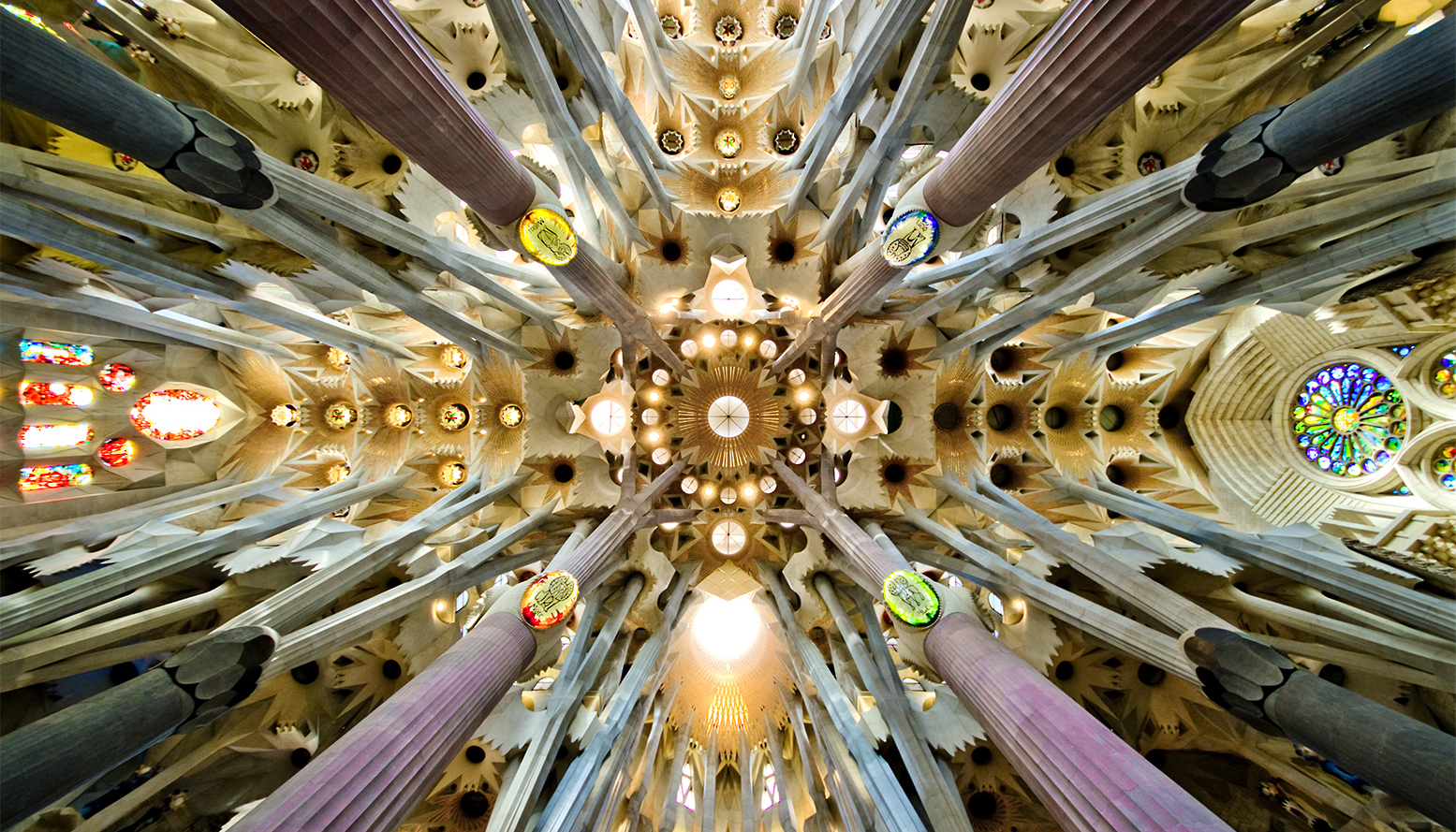
The ceiling of the nave in the Sagrada Família has a hyperboloid vault. Inspiration from nature is taken from a tree, as the pillar and branches symbolise trees rising up to the roof.

This study of nature translated into his use of ruled geometrical forms such as the hyperbolic paraboloid, the hyperboloid, the helicoid and the cone, which reflect forms Gaudí found in nature. Ruled surfaces are forms generated by a straight line known as the generatrix, as it moves over one or several lines known as directrices. Gaudí found abundant examples of them in nature, for instance in rushes, reeds and bones; he said that no better structure exists than the trunk of a tree or a human skeleton. These forms are both functional and aesthetic, and Gaudí adapted nature to the structural needs of architecture. He used to equate the helicoid form to movement and the hyperboloid to light. Concerning ruled surfaces, he said:

Paraboloids, hyperboloids and helicoids, constantly varying the incidence of the light, are rich in matrices themselves, which make ornamentation and even modelling unnecessary.

Another element widely used by Gaudí was the catenary arch. He had studied geometry when he was young, absorbing numerous articles about engineering, a field that praised the catenary curve as a mechanical element, although at that time they were used only in the construction of suspension bridges. Gaudí was the first to use this element in common architecture. Catenary arches in works like the Casa Milà, the Teresian College, the crypt of the Colònia Güell and the Sagrada Família allowed Gaudí to add strength to his structures, given that the catenary distributes weight evenly, affected only by self-cancelling tangential forces.

Gaudí evolved from planar to spatial geometry, and then to ruled geometry. These forms allowed the use of cheap materials such as brick. Gaudí frequently used brick laid with mortar in successive layers, as in the traditional Catalan vault, laying the brick flat instead of on its side or its end. This quest for new structural solutions culminated between 1910 and 1920, when he exploited his research and experience in his masterpiece, the Sagrada Família. Gaudí conceived the interior of the church as if it were a forest, with a set of tree-like columns growing into branches to support a structure of intertwined hyperboloid vaults. He inclined the columns so they could better resist the perpendicular pressure on their section. He also gave them a double-turn helicoidal shape (right turn and left turn), as in the branches and trunks of trees. This structure is now known to be fractal. Together with a modulation of the space that divides it into small, independent and self-supporting segments, it creates a structure that supports the mechanical traction forces without need for buttresses, as required by the neo-Gothic style. Gaudí thus achieved a structured and logical solution, establishing an architectural style that was original, simple, practical and aesthetic.

==== Surpassing the Gothic ====
This new constructional technique allowed Gaudí to achieve his greatest architectural goal; to perfect and surpass Gothic style. The hyperboloid vaults have their centre where Gothic vaults placed their keystone, and the hyperboloid allows for a hole in this space to let in natural light. In the intersection between vaults, where Gothic vaults have ribs, the hyperboloid allows holes as well, which Gaudí employed to give the impression of a starry sky.

Gaudí complemented these insights with a unique spatial vision that allowed him to conceive his designs in three dimensions. He said that he had acquired this spatial sense as a boy by looking at his father's drawings of boilers and stills. Because of this spatial conception, Gaudí preferred to work with casts and scale models or even improvise on-site as a work progressed. Reluctant to draw plans, he sketched his works only when required.

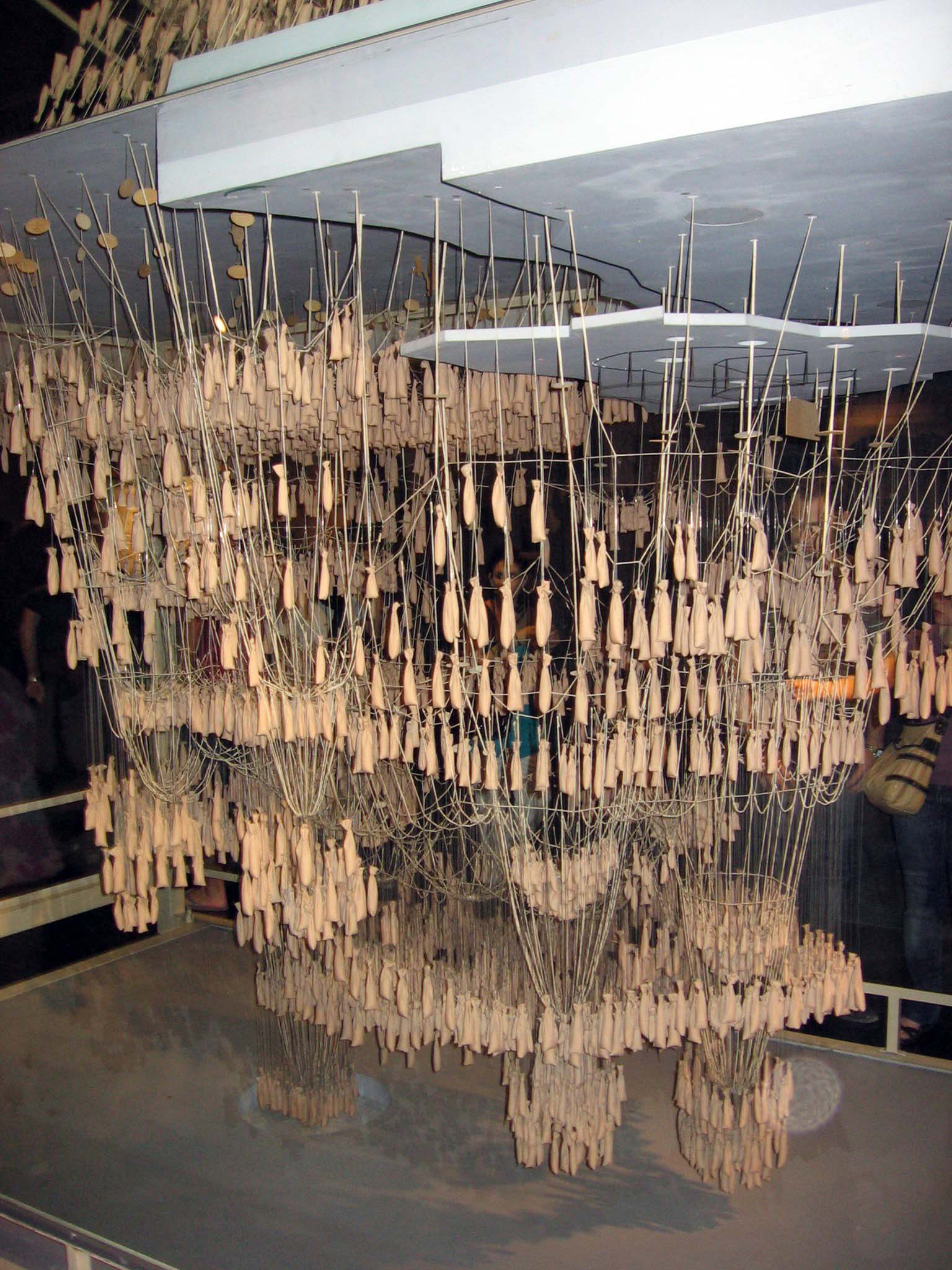
An upside-down force model of the Colònia Güell, Sagrada Família Museum

Another of Gaudí's innovations in the technical realm was the use of a scale model to calculate structures: for the church of the Colònia Güell, he built a 1:10 scale model with a height of 4 metres (13 ft) in a shed next to the building. There, he set up a model that had strings with small bags full of birdshot hanging from them. On a drawing board that was attached to the ceiling he drew the floor of the church, and he hung the strings (for the catenaries) with the birdshot (for their weight) from the supporting points of the building—columns and corners. These weights produced a catenary curve in both the arches and vaults. At that point, he took a photograph that, when inverted, showed the structure for columns and arches. Gaudí then painted over these photographs with gouache or pastel. The outline of the church defined, he recorded every detail of the building: architectural, stylistic and decorative.

Gaudí's position in the history of architecture is that of a creative genius who, inspired by nature, developed a unique style that attained technical perfection as well as aesthetic value. Gaudí's structural innovations were to an extent the result of his journey through various styles. These styles culminated in his work, which reinterpreted and perfected them. Gaudí passed through the historicism and eclecticism of his generation without connecting with other 20th century architectural movements. The Bauhaus school represented an antithetical evolution to that initiated by Gaudí, given that it later reflected the disdain and the initial lack of comprehension of the work of the Modernista architect.

Among other factors that led to the initial neglect of Gaudi's work was that despite his numerous assistants and helpers, Gaudí created no school, never taught, nor did he leave written documents. Some of his subordinates adopted his innovations, above all Francesc Berenguer and Josep Maria Jujol; others, like Cèsar Martinell, Francesc Folguera and Josep Francesc Ràfols graduated towards Noucentisme, leaving the master's trail. Despite this, influence can be discerned in some architects that either formed part of the Modernista movement or departed from it and who had had no direct contact with him, such as Josep Maria Pericas (Casa Alòs, Ripoll), Bernardí Martorell (Olius cemetery) and Lluís Muncunill (Masia Freixa, Terrassa). Nonetheless, Gaudí left a deep mark on 20th-century architecture: masters like Le Corbusier declared themselves admirers, and he inspired other architects such as Pier Luigi Nervi, Friedensreich Hundertwasser, Oscar Niemeyer, Félix Candela, Eduardo Torroja and Santiago Calatrava. Frei Otto used Gaudí's forms in the construction of the Munich Olympic Stadium. In Japan, the work of Kenji Imai bears evidence of Gaudí's influence, as can be seen in the Memorial for the Twenty-six Martyrs of Japan in Nagasaki (Japanese National Architecture Award in 1962), where the use of Gaudí's famous "trencadís" stands out.

=== Design and craftsmanship ===
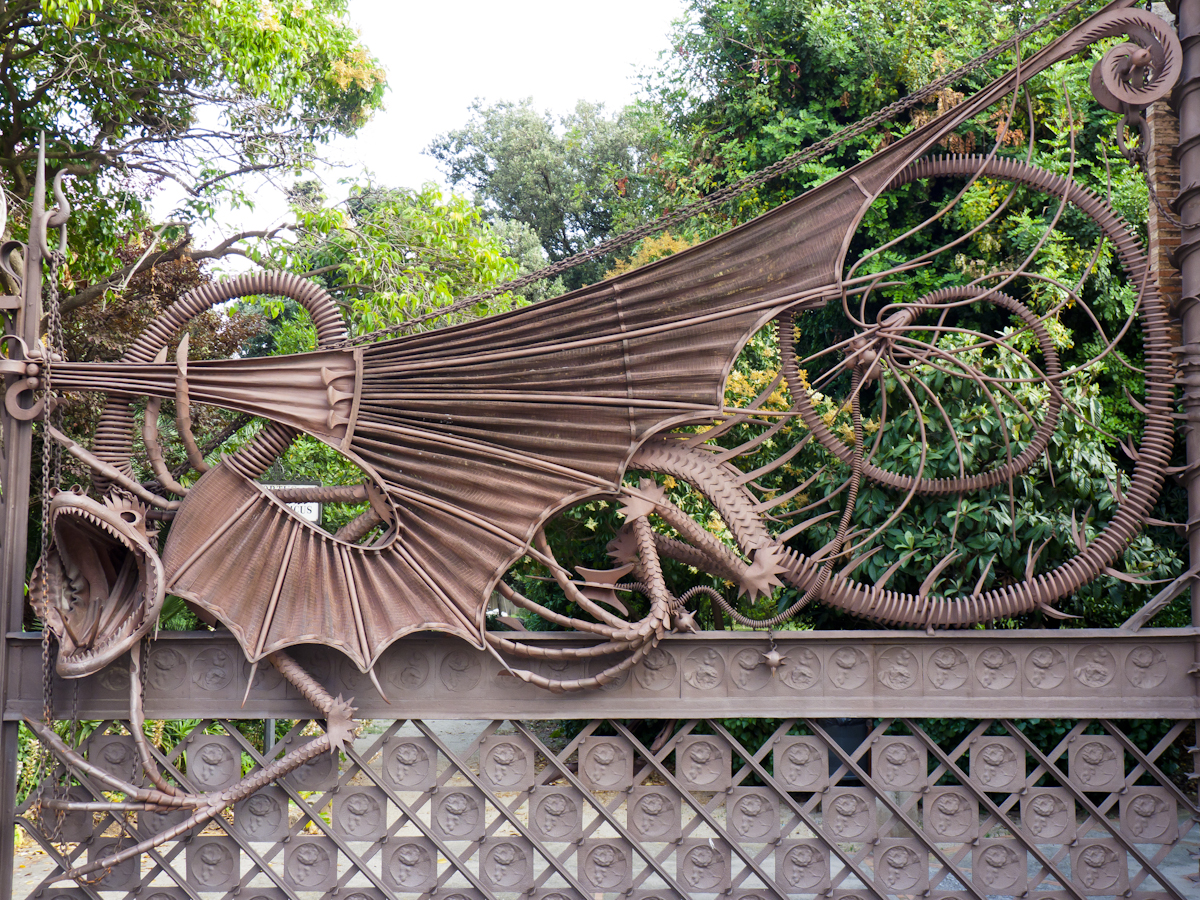
Entrance gate of the Güell Pavilions

During his student days, Gaudí attended craft workshops, such as those taught by Eudald Puntí, Llorenç Matamala and Joan Oñós, where he learned the basic aspects of techniques relating to architecture, including sculpture, carpentry, wrought ironwork, stained glass, ceramics, plaster modelling, etc. He absorbed technological developments, integrating into his technique the use of iron and reinforced concrete. Gaudí took a broad view of architecture as a multifunctional design, in which the details in an arrangement must be harmoniously made and well-proportioned. This knowledge allowed him to design architectural projects, including all the elements of his works, from furnishings to illumination to wrought ironwork.

Gaudí was also a craft innovator, conceiving technical and decorative solutions with materials not always associated with architecture, for example designing ceramic mosaics made of waste pieces ("trencadís") in original and imaginative combinations. For the restoration of Mallorca Cathedral he invented a new technique to produce stained glass, which consisted of juxtaposing three glass panes of primary colours, and sometimes a neutral one, varying the thickness of the glass in order to graduate the light's intensity.

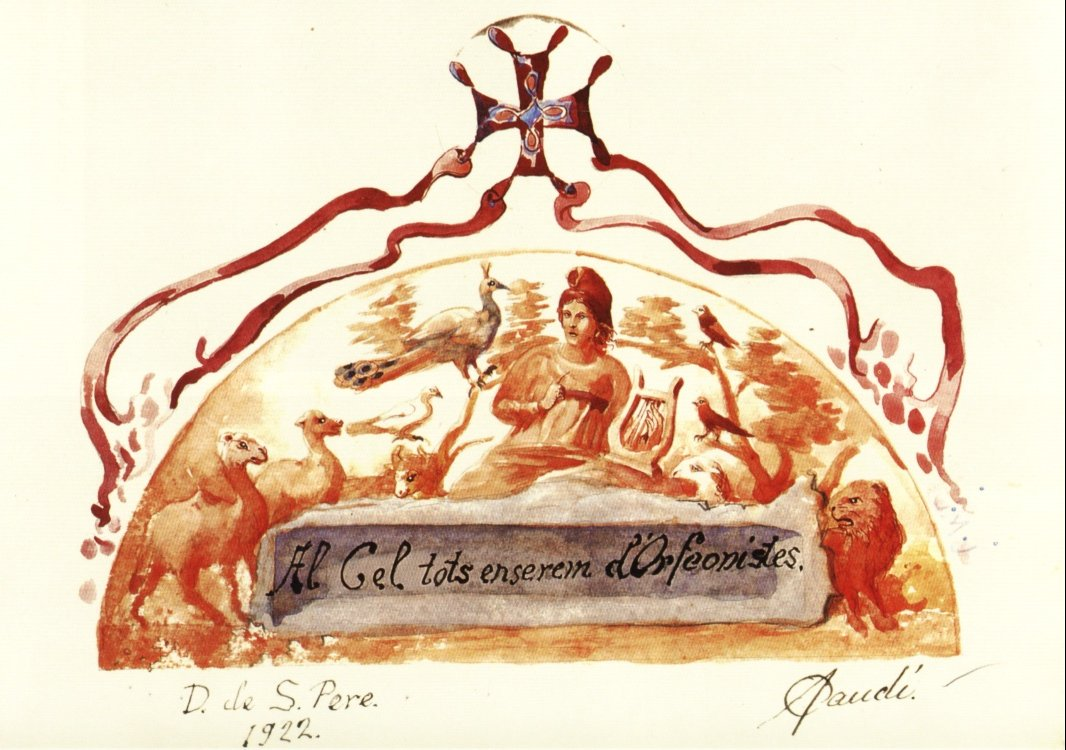
Dedicatory object for Orfeó Català (1922), designed by Gaudí, drawn by Francesc Quintana and coloured by Josep Maria Jujol

He personally designed many of the Sagrada Família's sculptures. He studied the anatomy of the figure, concentrating on gestures. For this purpose, he studied the human skeleton and sometimes used dummies made of wire to test the appropriate posture of the figure he was about to sculpt. In a second step, he photographed his models, using a mirror system that provided multiple perspectives. He then made plaster casts of the figures, both of people and animals (on one occasion he made a donkey stand up so it would not move). He modified the proportions of these casts to obtain the figure's desired appearance, depending on its place in the church (the higher up, the bigger it would be). Eventually, he sculpted the figures in stone.

==== Urban spaces and landscaping ====
Gaudí also practised landscaping, often in urban settings. He aimed to place his works in appropriate natural and architectural surroundings by studying the scene of his constructions thoroughly and trying to naturally integrate them into those surroundings. For this purpose, he often used material that was common in the nearby environment, such as Bellesguard slate and grey Bierzo granite in the Episcopal Palace, Astorga. Many of his projects were gardens, such as the Güell Park and the Can Artigas Gardens, or incorporated gardens, as in the Casa Vicens or the Güell Pavilions. Gaudí's harmonious approach to landscaping is exemplified at the First Mystery of the Glory of the Rosary at Montserrat, where the architectural framework is nature itself—here the Montserrat rock—nature encircles the group of sculptures that adorned the path to the Holy Cave.

==== Interiors ====
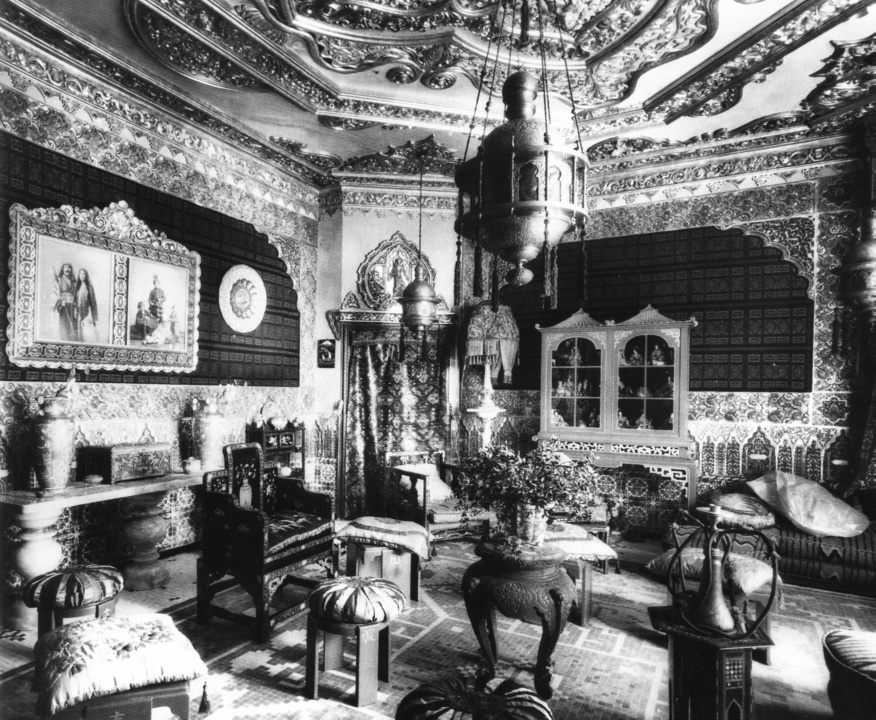
Interior of the Casa Vicens

Equally, Gaudí stood out as interior decorator, decorating most of his buildings personally, from the furnishings to the smallest details. In each case he knew how to apply stylistic particularities, personalising the decoration according to the owner's taste, the predominant style of the arrangement or its place in the surroundings—whether urban or natural, secular or religious. Many of his works were related to liturgical furnishing. From the design of a desk for his office at the beginning of his career to the furnishings designed for the Sobrellano Palace of Comillas, he designed all furnishing of the Vicens, Calvet, Batlló and Milà houses, of the Güell Palace and the Bellesguard Tower, and the liturgical furnishing of the Sagrada Família. It is noteworthy that Gaudí studied some ergonomy in order to adapt his furnishings to human anatomy. Many of his furnishings are exhibited at Gaudí House Museum.

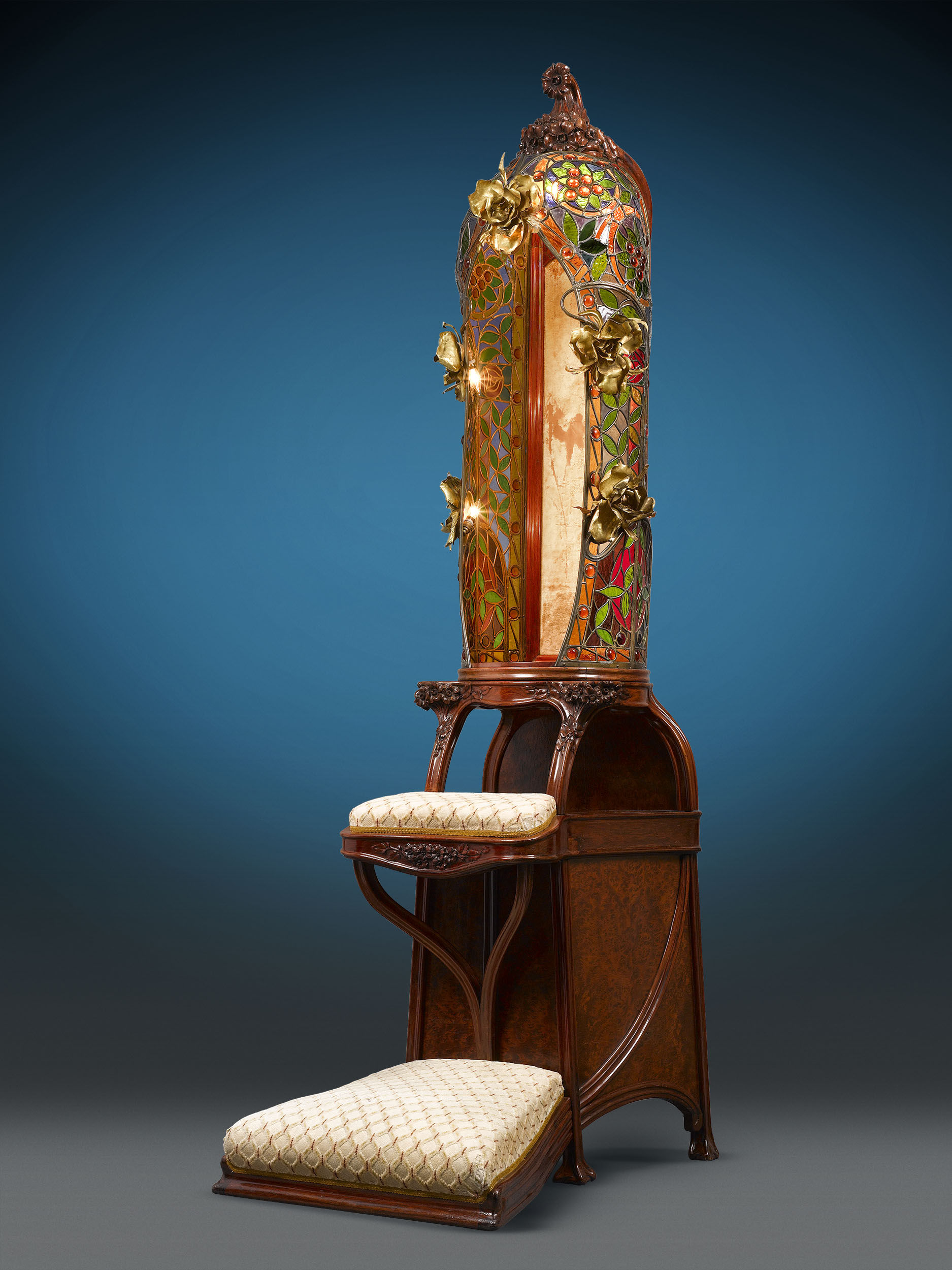
Prie Dieu, or prayer desk, designed by Gaudí for Casa Batlló

Another aspect is the intelligent distribution of space, always with the aim of creating a comfortable, intimate, interior atmosphere. For this purpose, Gaudí would divide spaces into sections, adapted to their specific use, by means of low walls, dropped ceilings, sliding doors and wall closets. Apart from taking care of every detail of all structural and ornamental elements, he made sure his constructions had good lighting and ventilation. For this purpose, he studied each project's orientation with respect to the cardinal points, as well as the local climate and its place in its surroundings. At that time, there was an increasing demand for more domestic comfort, with piped water and gas and the use of electric light, all of which Gaudí expertly incorporated. For the Sagrada Família, for example, he carried out thorough studies on acoustics and illumination, in order to optimise them. With regard to light, he stated:

Light achieves maximum harmony at an inclination of 45°, since it resides on objects in a way that is neither horizontal nor vertical. This can be considered medium light, and it offers the most perfect vision of objects and their most exquisite nuances. It is the Mediterranean light.

Lighting also served Gaudí for the organisation of space, which required a careful study of the gradient of light intensity to adequately adapt to each specific environment. He achieved this with different elements such as skylights, windows, shutters and blinds; a notable case is the gradation of colour used in the atrium of the Casa Batlló to achieve uniform distribution of light throughout the interior. He also tended to build south-facing houses to maximise sunlight.

== Works ==
Gaudi's stylistic evolution did not occur in clearly defined stages with obvious boundaries: rather, each stage included reflections of the earlier ones. Disciple and biographer Joan Bergós defined five periods in Gaudí's productions: preliminary period, mudéjar-morisco (Moorish/mudéjar art), emulated Gothic, naturalist and expressionist, and organic synthesis.

=== Early works ===
Gaudí's first works both from his student days and just after stand out for the precision of their details, the use of geometry and the prevalence of mechanical considerations in the calculations.

==== University years ====
During his studies, his notable designs include: a cemetery gate (1875), a Spanish pavilion for the Philadelphia World Fair of 1876, a quay-side building (1876), a courtyard for the Diputació de Barcelona (1876), a monumental fountain for the Plaça Catalunya in Barcelona (1877) and a university assembly hall (1877).

Student works

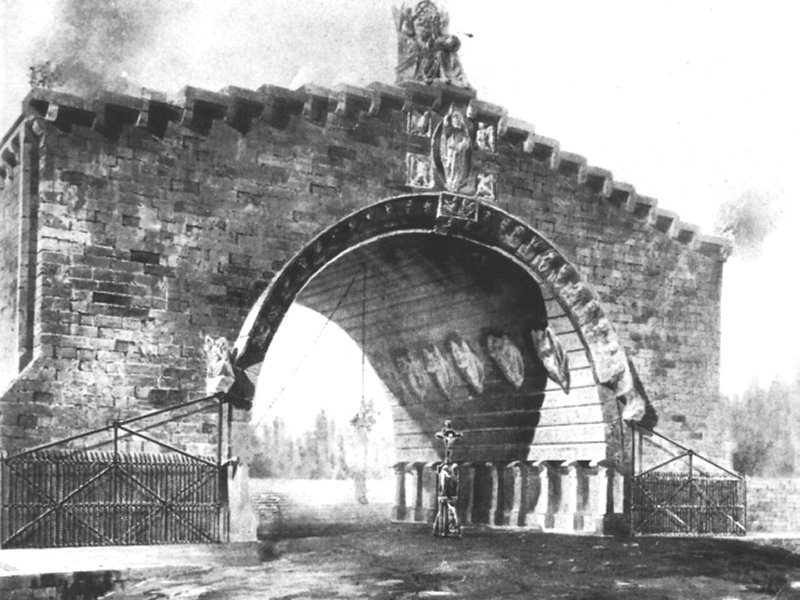
Cemetery gate (1875)

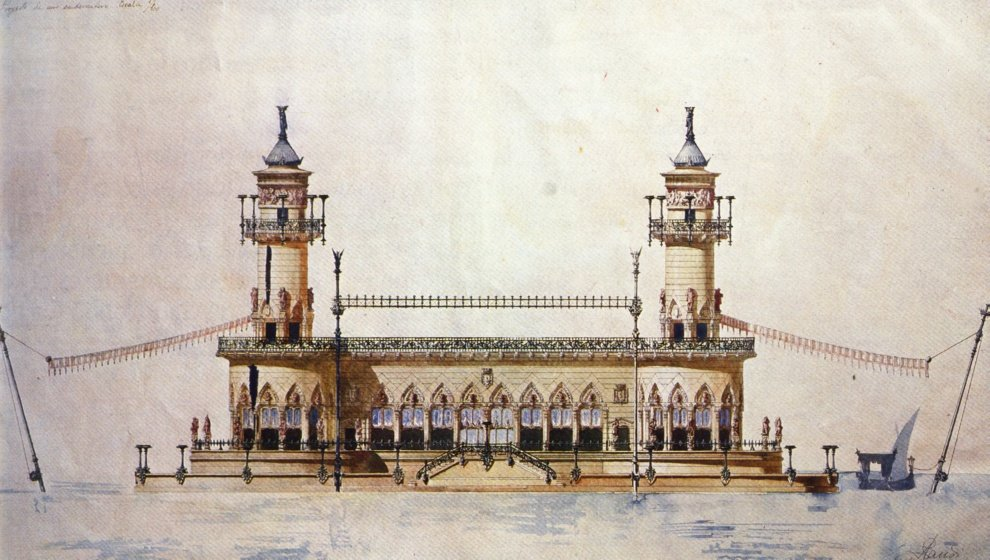
Quay-side building (1876)

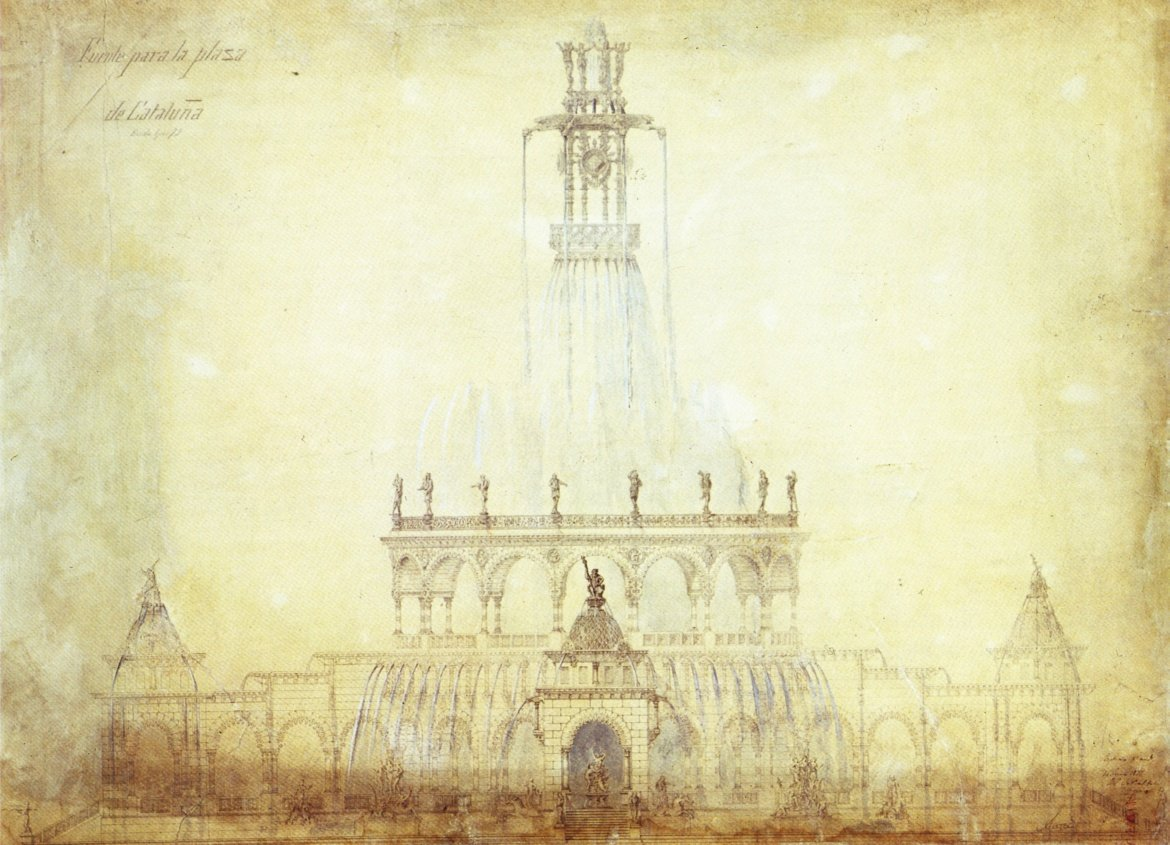
Fountain in Plaça Catalunya (1877)

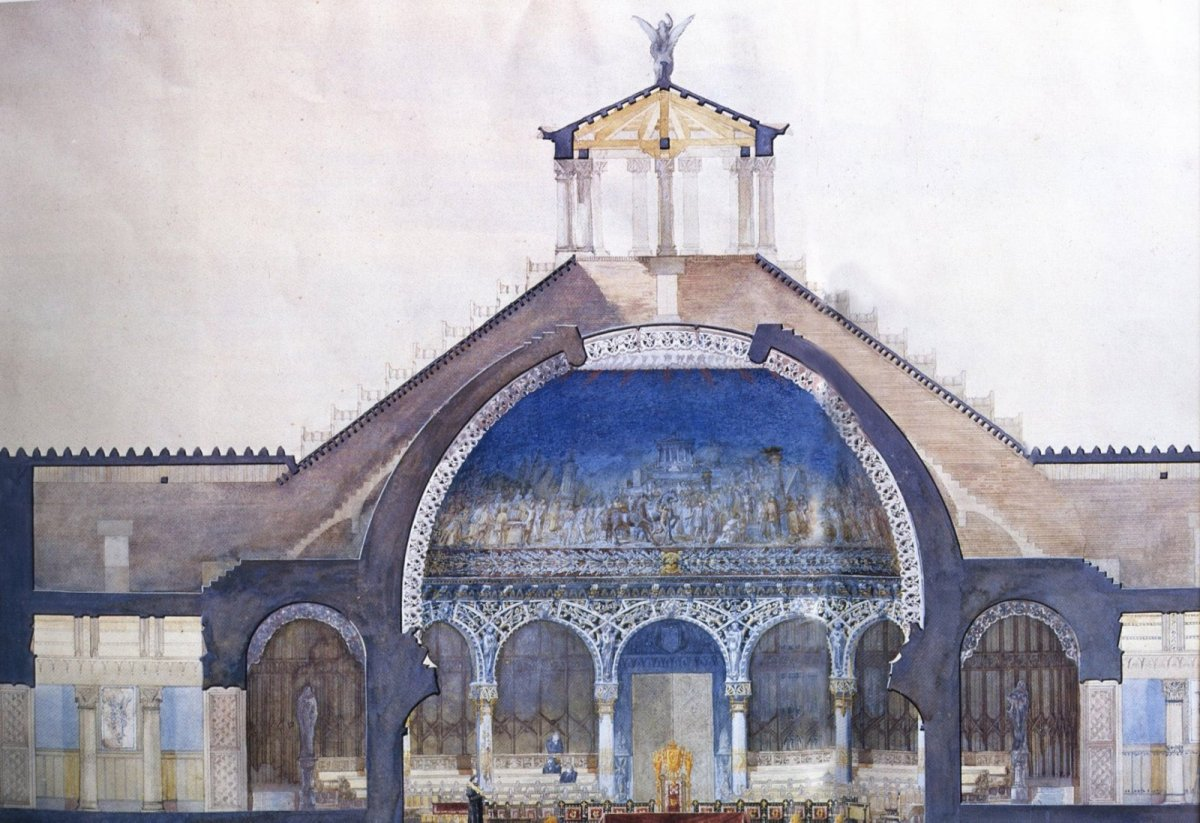
University assembly hall (1877)

Gaudí had a long-standing relationship with Josep Fontserè. Despite not having an architecture degree, Fontserè received the commission from the city council for the Parc de la Ciutadella development, carried out between 1873 and 1882. For this project, Gaudí was in charge of the design of the Park's entrance gate, the bandstand's balustrade and the water project for the monumental fountain, where he designed an artificial cave that showed his liking for nature and the organic touch that later became central.

Gaudí worked for Francisco de Paula del Villar on the apse of the Montserrat monastery, designing the niche for the image of the Black Virgin of Montserrat in 1876. He later substituted Villar in the works of the Sagrada Família. With Leandre Serrallach, he worked on a tram line project to Villa Arcadia in Montjuïc. Eventually, he collaborated with Joan Martorell on the Jesuit church on Carrer Casp and the Salesian convent in Passeig de Sant Joan, as well as the Villaricos church (Almería). He also carried out a project for Martorell for the competition for a new façade for Barcelona cathedral, which was not accepted. His relationship with Martorell, whom he always considered one of his main and most influential masters, brought him unexpected luck; he later recommended Gaudí for the Sagrada Família.

==== Early post-graduation projects ====
After his graduation as an architect in 1878, Gaudí's first work was a set of lampposts for the Plaça Reial, the project for the Girossi newsstands and the Mataró cooperative, his first important work. He received the request from the city council of Barcelona in February 1878, when he had graduated but not yet received his degree. For this commission he designed two types of lampposts: one with six arms, of which two were installed in the Plaça Reial, and another with three, of which two were installed in the Pla del Palau, opposite the Civil Government. The lampposts were inaugurated during the Mercè festivities in 1879. Made of cast iron with a marble base, they have a decoration in which the caduceus of Mercury is prominent, symbol of commerce and emblem of Barcelona.

Early post-graduate works

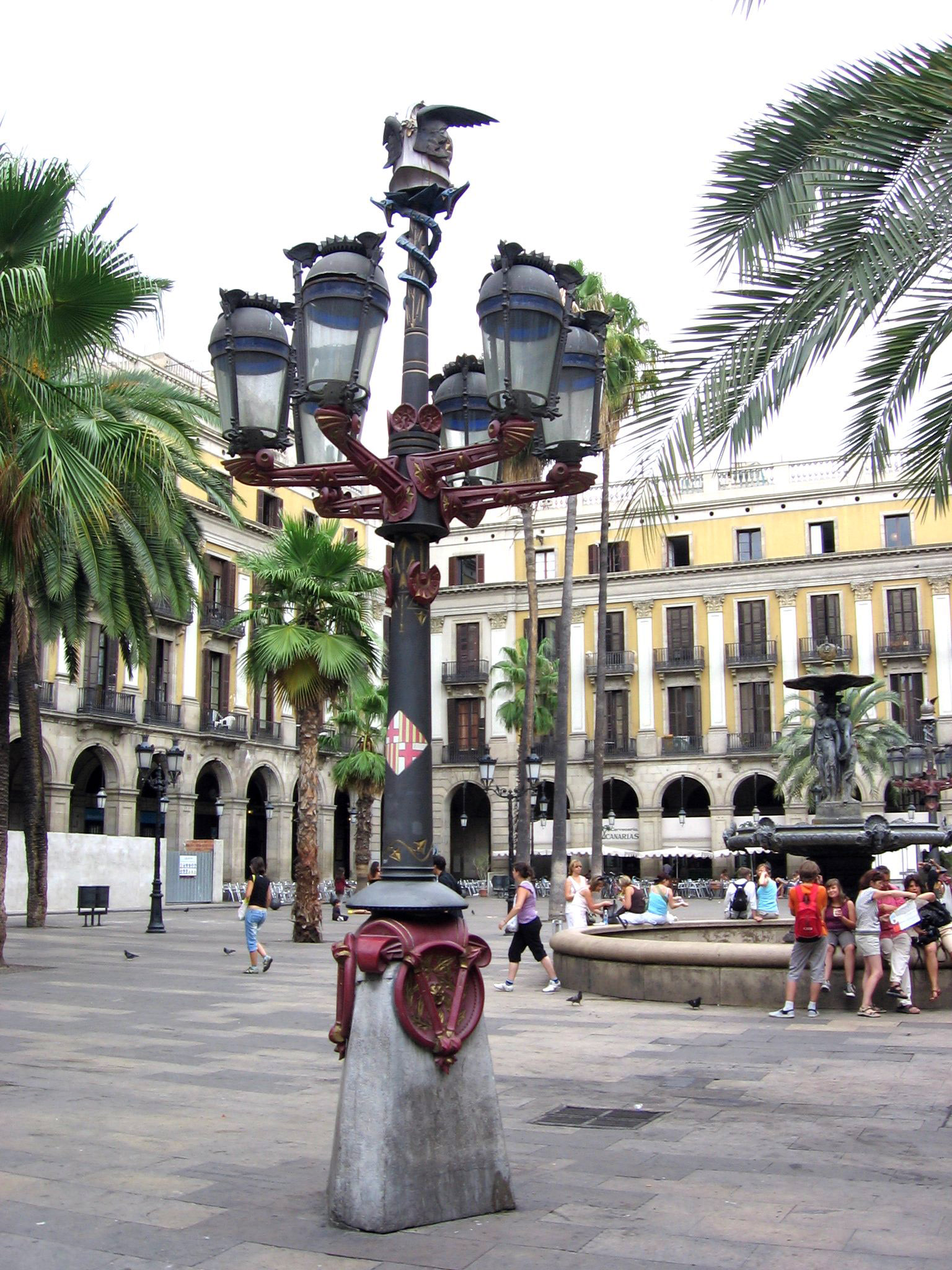
Lampposts

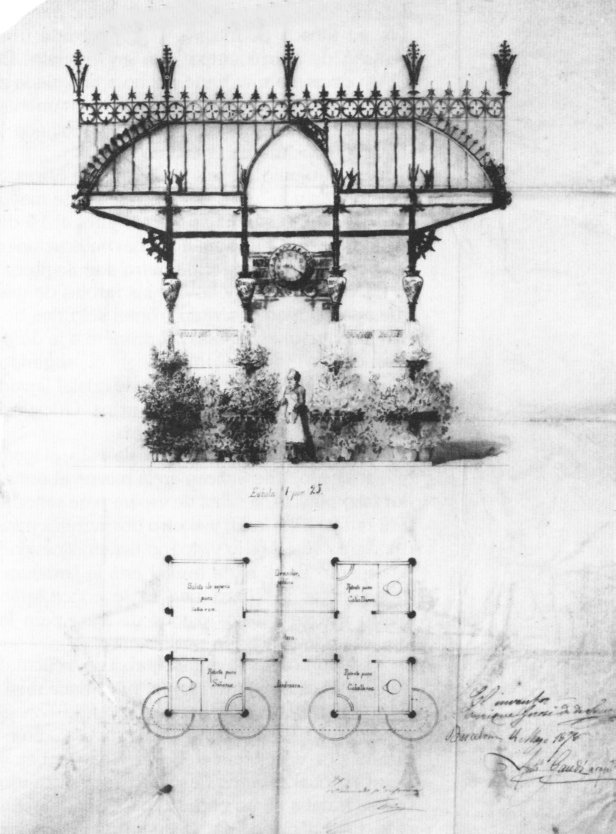
Girossi newsstands

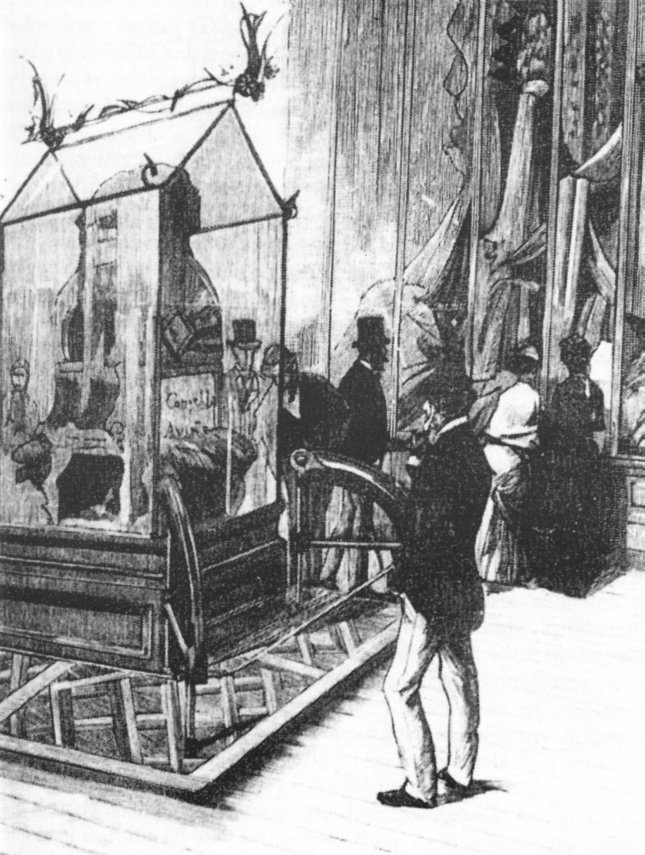
Esteban Comella display

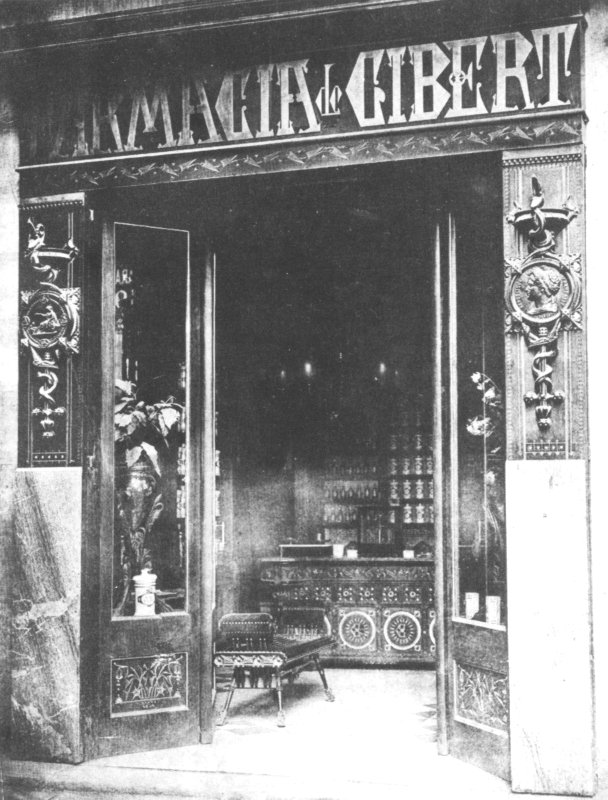
Gibert Pharmacy

The Girossi newsstands project, which was not carried out, was a commission from tradesman Enrique Girossi de Sanctis. It would have consisted of 20 newsstands, spread throughout Barcelona. Each would have included a public lavatory, a flower stand and glass panels for advertisements as well as a clock, a calendar, a barometer and a thermometer. Gaudí conceived a structure with iron pillars and marble and glass slabs, crowned by a large iron and glass roof, with a gas illumination system.

The Cooperativa Obrera Mataronense (Mataró Workers' Cooperative) was Gaudí's first big project, on which he worked from 1878 to 1882, for Salvador Pagès i Anglada. The project, for the cooperative's head office in Mataró, comprised a factory, a worker's housing estate, a social centre and a services building, though only the factory and the services building were completed. In the factory roof Gaudí used the catenary arch for the first time, with a bolt assembly system devised by Philibert de l'Orme. He used ceramic tile decoration for the first time in the services building. Gaudí laid out the site taking account of solar orientation, another signature element, and included landscaped areas. He even designed the Cooperative's banner, with the figure of a bee, symbol of industriousness.

In May 1878 Gaudí designed a display cabinet for the Esteban Comella glove factory, which was exhibited in the Spanish pavilion at the Paris World Exhibition that year. This work attracted the attention of entrepreneur Eusebi Güell, visiting the French capital; he was so impressed that he wanted to meet Gaudí on his return, beginning a long friendship and professional collaboration. Güell became Gaudí's main patron and sponsor of many of his large projects.

==== First Güell projects ====
Güell's first task for Gaudí, that same year, was the design of the furniture for the pantheon chapel of the Palacio de Sobrellano in Comillas, which was then being constructed by Joan Martorell, Gaudí's teacher, at the request of the Marquis of Comillas, Güell's father in law. Gaudí designed a chair, a bench and a prayer stool: the chair was upholstered with velvet, finished with two eagles and the Marquis's coat of arms; the bench stands out with the motif of a dragon, designed by Llorenç Matamala; the prayer stool is decorated with plants.

Also in 1878 he drew up the plans for a theatre in the former town of Sant Gervasi de Cassoles (now a district of Barcelona); Gaudí did not take part in the construction, which no longer exists. The following year he designed the furniture and counter for the Gibert Pharmacy, with marquetry of Arab influence. The same year he made five drawings for a procession in honour of poet Francesc Vicent Garcia i Torres in Vallfogona de Riucorb, where this celebrated 17th-century writer and friend of Lope de Vega was the parish priest. Gaudí's project centred on the poet and on several aspects of agricultural work, such as reaping and harvesting grapes and olives; however, as a result of organisational problems Gaudí's ideas were not carried out.

Between 1879 and 1881 he drew up a proposal for the decoration of the church of Sant Pacià, belonging to the Colegio de Jesús-María in Sant Andreu del Palomar: he created the altar in a Gothic style, the monstrance with Byzantine influence, the mosaics and the lighting, as well as the school's furniture. The church caught fire during the Tragic Week of 1909, and now only the mosaics remain, of "opus tesselatum", probably the work of the Italian mosaicist Luigi Pellerin. He was given the task of decorating the church of the Colegio de Jesús-María in Tarragona (1880–1882): he created the altar in white Italian marble, and its front part, or antependium, with four columns bearing medallions of polychrome alabaster, with figures of angels; the ostensory with gilt wood, the work of Eudald Puntí, decorated with rosaries, angels, tetramorph symbols and the dove of the Holy Ghost; and the choir stalls, which were destroyed in 1936.

In 1880 he designed an electric lighting project for Barcelona's Muralla de Mar, or seawall, which was not carried out. It consisted of eight large iron streetlamps, profusely decorated with plant motifs, friezes, shields and names of battles and Catalan admirals. The same year he participated in the competition for the construction of the San Sebastián social centre (now town hall), won by Luis Aladrén Mendivi and Adolfo Morales de los Ríos; Gaudí submitted a project that synthesised several of his earlier studies, such as the fountain for the Plaça Catalunya and the courtyard of the Provincial Council.

==== Collaboration with Martorell ====
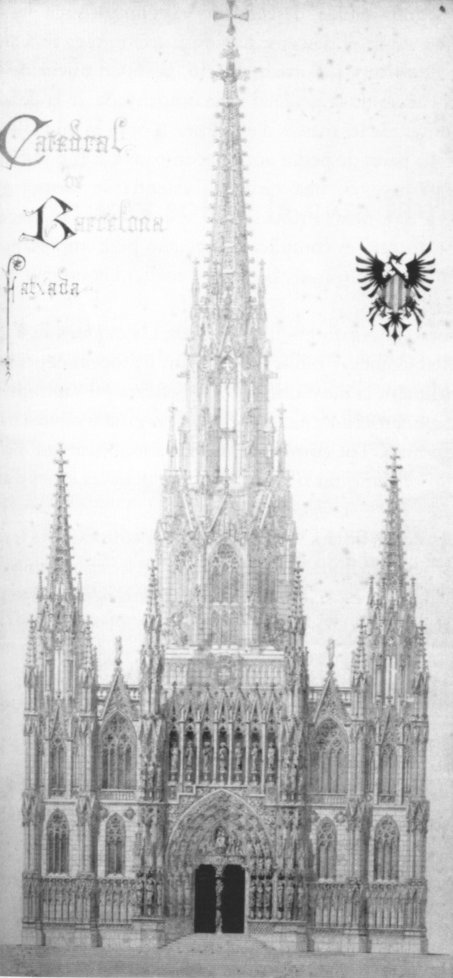
Gaudí's drawing for the façade of the Barcelona Cathedral

A new task of the Güell-López's for Comillas was the gazebo for Alfonso XII's visit in 1881. Gaudí designed a small pavilion in the shape of a Hindu turban, covered in mosaics and decorated with an abundance of small bells that rang constantly. It was subsequently moved into the Güell Pavilions.

In 1882 he designed a Benedictine monastery and a church dedicated to the Holy Spirit in Villaricos (Cuevas de Vera, Almería) for Martorell. It was of neo-Gothic design, similar to the Convent of the Salesians that Gaudí also planned with Martorell. It was not carried out, and the plans were destroyed in the looting of the Sagrada Família in 1936. The same year he was tasked with constructing a hunting lodge and wine cellars at a country residence known as La Cuadra, in Garraf (Sitges), a Güell property. The wine cellars, but not the lodge, were built some years later. With Martorell he collaborated on three other projects: the church of the Jesuit School in Carrer Caspe; the Convent of the Salesians in Passeig de Sant Joan, a neo-Gothic project with an altar in the centre of the crossing; and the façade project for Barcelona cathedral, for the competition convened by the cathedral chapter in 1882, ultimately won by Josep Oriol Mestres and August Font i Carreras.

Gaudí's collaboration with Martorell was a determining factor in Gaudí's recommendation for the Sagrada Família. The church was the idea of Josep Maria Bocabella, founder of the Devotees of Saint Joseph Association, which acquired a complete block of Barcelona's Eixample district. The project was originally entrusted to Francisco de Paula del Villar y Lozano, who planned a neo-Gothic church, on which work began in 1882. However, the following year Villar resigned due to disagreements with the construction board, and the task went to Gaudí, who completely redesigned the project, apart from the part of the crypt that had already been built.

=== Orientalist period ===
During these years Gaudí completed a series of works with a distinctly oriental flavour, inspired by the art of the Middle and Far East (India, Persia, Japan), as well as Islamic-Hispanic art, mainly Mudejar and Nazari. Gaudí used ceramic tile decoration abundantly, as well as Moorish arches, columns of exposed brick and pinnacles in the shape of pavilions or domes.

Between 1883 and 1888 he constructed the Casa Vicens, commissioned by stockbroker Manuel Vicens i Montaner. It featured four floors, with façades on three sides and an extensive garden, including a monumental brick fountain. The house was surrounded by a wall with iron gates, decorated with palmetto leaves by Matamala. The walls of the house are stone alternated with lines of tile, which imitate yellow flowers typical of this area; the house is topped with chimneys and turrets. In the interior the polychrome wooden roof beams stand out, adorned with floral themes of papier maché; the walls are decorated with vegetable motifs, as well as paintings by Josep Torrescasana; finally, the floor consists of Roman-style mosaics of "opus tesselatum". Among the most original rooms is the smoking room, its ceiling decorated with Moorish honeycomb-work, reminiscent of the Generalife in the Alhambra in Granada.

Orientalist works

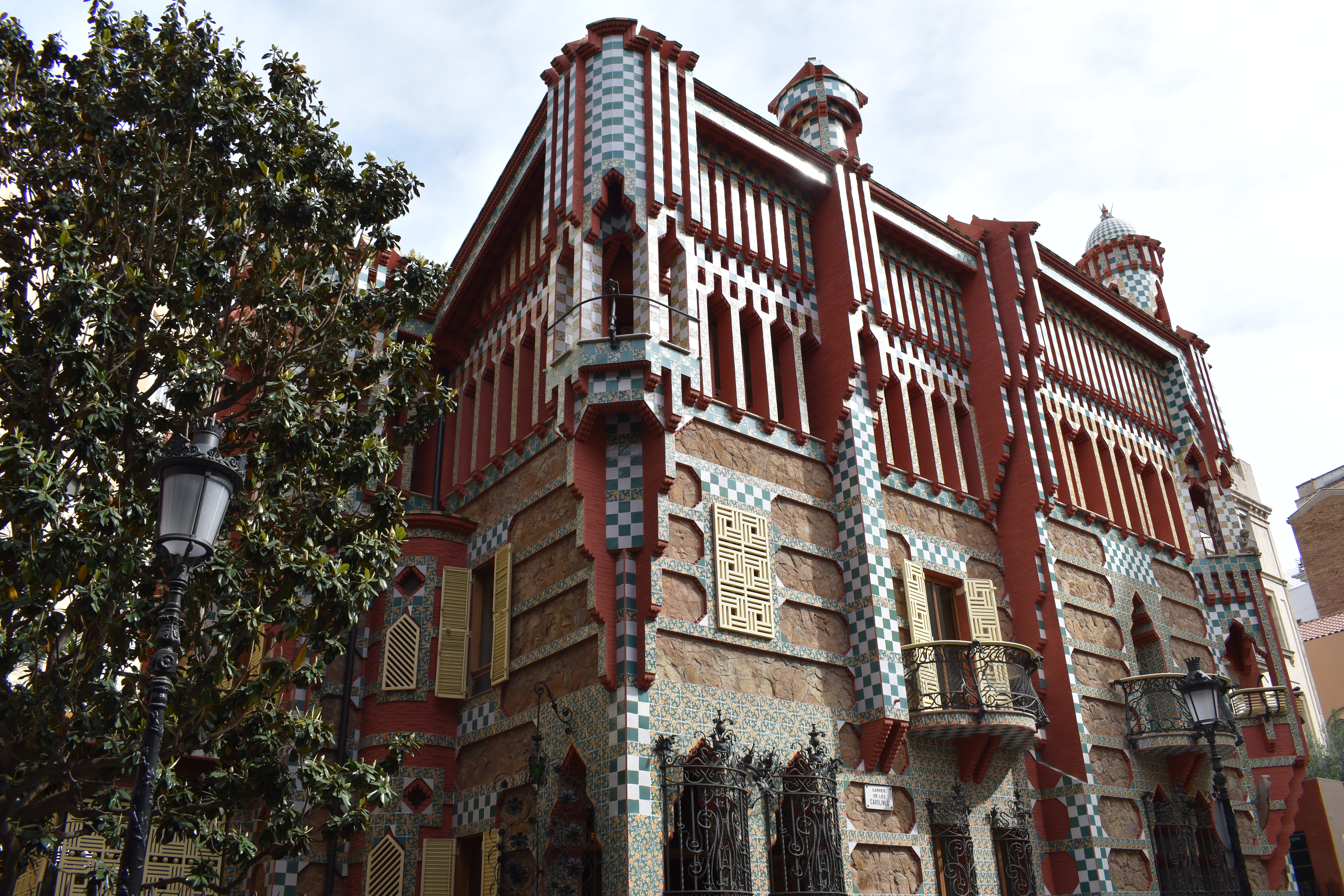
Casa Vicens (1883–88)

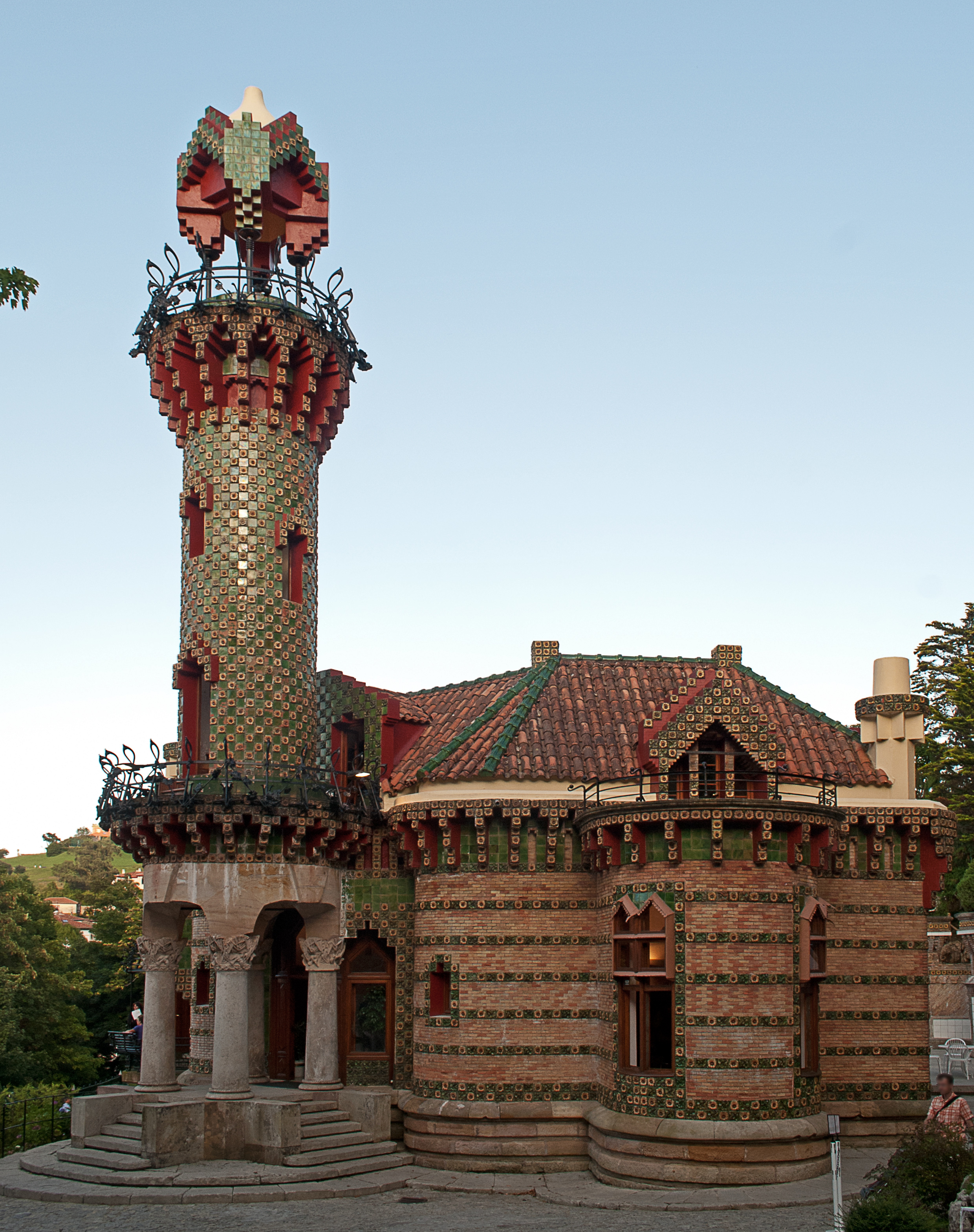
El Capricho (1883–85)

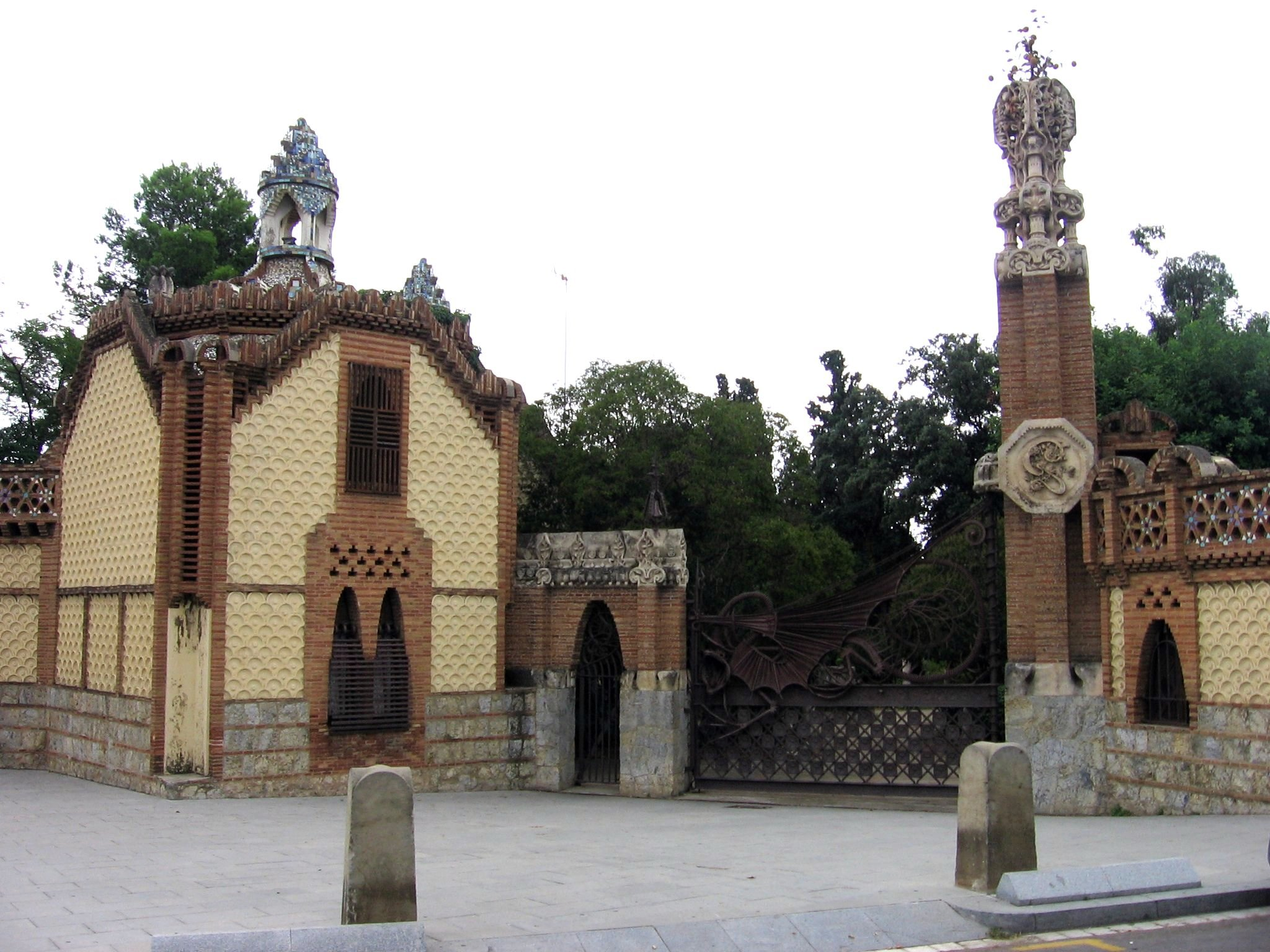
Güell Pavilions (1884–87)

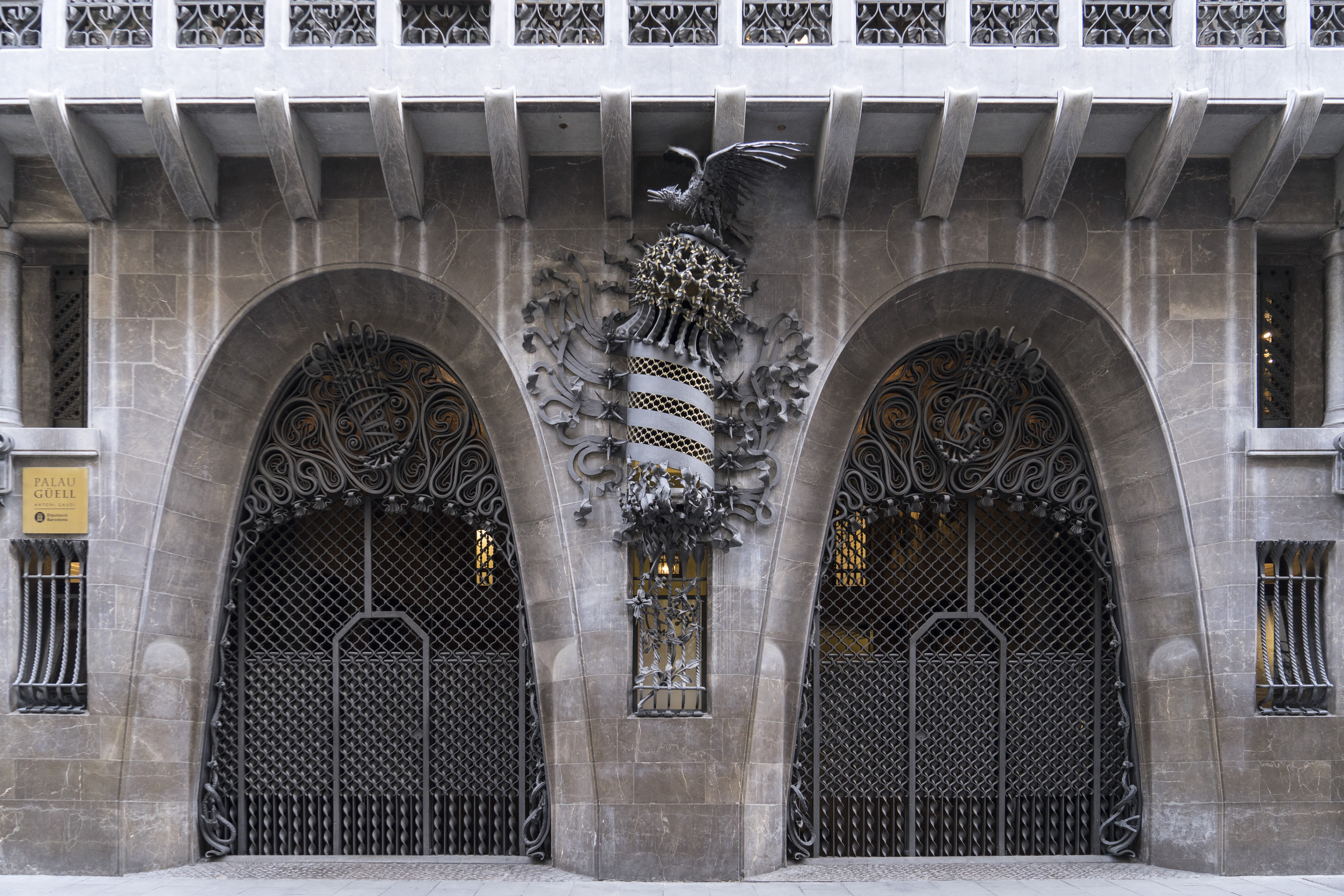
Palau Güell (1886–88)

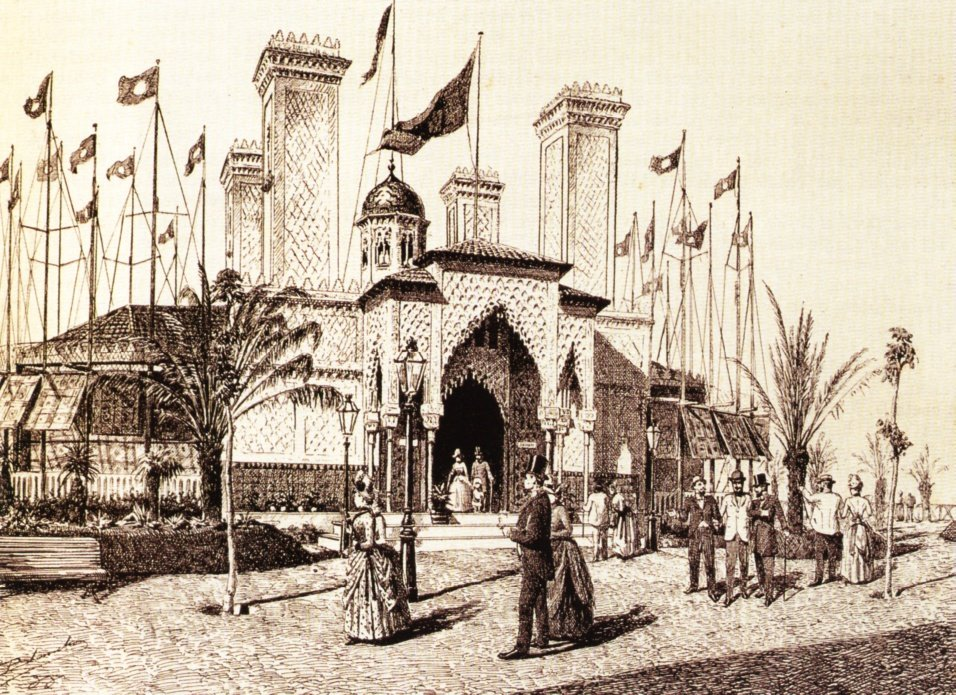
Compañía Trasatlántica (1888)

Also in 1883, Gaudí designed the Santísimo Sacramento chapel for the parish church of San Félix de Alella, as well as some topographical plans for the Can Rosell de la Llena country residence in Gelida. He also received a commission to build a small annex to the Palacio de Sobrellano, for the Baron of Comillas, in the Cantabrian town of the same name. Known as El Capricho, it was commissioned by Máximo Díaz de Quijano and constructed between 1883 and 1885. Cristòfor Cascante i Colom, Gaudí's fellow student, directed the construction. In an oriental style, it has an elongated shape, on three levels and a cylindrical tower in the shape of a Persian minaret, faced completely in ceramics. The entrance is set behind four columns supporting depressed arches, with capitals decorated with birds and leaves, similar to those at the Casa Vicens. Notable are the main lounge, with its large sash window, and the smoking room with a false Arab-style stucco vault ceiling.

Gaudí carried out a second commission from Güell between 1884 and 1887, the Güell Pavilions in Pedralbes, now on the outskirts of Barcelona. Güell had a country residence in Les Corts de Sarrià, consisting of two adjacent properties known as Can Feliu and Can Cuyàs de la Riera. Martorell had built a Caribbean-style mansion, which was demolished in 1919 to make way for the Royal Palace of Pedralbes. Gaudí undertook to refurbish the house and construct a wall and porter's lodge. He completed the stone wall with several entrances, the main entrance with an iron gate in the shape of a dragon, with symbology allusive to the myths of Hercules and the Garden of the Hesperides. The buildings consist of a stable, covered longeing ring and porter's lodge: the stable has a rectangular base and catenary arches; the longeing ring has a square base with a hyperboloid dome; the porter's lodge consists of three small buildings, the central polygonal one with a hyperbolic dome, and the other two smaller and cubic. All three are topped by ventilators in the shape of chimneys faced with ceramics. The walls are of exposed brick in various shades of reds and yellows; in certain sections prefabricated cement blocks are used. The Pavilions became the headquarters of the Real Cátedra Gaudí, of the Polytechnic University of Catalonia.

In 1885 Gaudí accepted a commission from Josep Maria Bocabella, promoter of the Sagrada Família, for an altar in the oratory of the Bocabella family, who had obtained permission from the Pope to have an altar in their home. The altar is made of varnished mahogany, with a slab of white marble in the centre for relics. It is decorated with plants and religious motifs, such as the Greek letters alpha and omega, symbolic of the beginning and end, gospel phrases and images of Saint Francis of Paola, Saint Teresa of Avila and the Holy Family and closed with a curtain of crimson embroidery. It was made by cabinet maker Frederic Labòria, who also collaborated with Gaudí on Sagrada Família.

Shortly after, Gaudí received an important commission from Güell: the construction of his family house, in the Carrer Nou de la Rambla in Barcelona. The Palau Güell (1886–1888) continues the tradition of large Catalan urban mansions such as those in Carrer Montcada. Gaudí designed a monumental entrance with a magnificent parabolic arch above iron gates, decorated with the Catalan coat of arms and a helmet with a winged dragon, the work of Joan Oñós. A notable feature is the triple-height entrance hall; it is the core of the building, surrounded by the main rooms, and it is remarkable for its double dome, with a parabolic interior and conical exterior, a solution typical of Byzantine art. For the gallery on the street façade Gaudí used an original system of catenary arches and columns with hyperbolic capitals, a style he used only there. He designed the interior with a sumptuous Mudejar-style decoration, where the wood and iron coffered ceilings stand out. The chimneys on the roof are a remarkable feature, faced in vividly coloured ceramic tiles, as is the tall spire in the form of a lantern tower, which is the external termination of the dome within, and is also faced with ceramic tiles and topped with an iron weather vane.

On the occasion of the World Expo held in Barcelona in 1888, Gaudí constructed the pavilion for the Compañía Trasatlántica, property of the Marquis of Comillas, in the Maritime Section of the event. He created it in a Granadinian Nazari style, with horseshoe arches and stucco decoration; the building survived until the Passeig Marítim was opened in 1960. In the wake of the event he received a commission from Barcelona Council to restore the Saló de Cent and the grand stairs in Barcelona City Hall, as well as a chair for the queen Maria Cristina; only the chair was made, which Mayor Francesc Rius i Taulet presented to the Queen.

=== Neo-Gothic period ===
During this period Gaudí was noticeably inspired by mediaeval Gothic art, but wanted to improve on its structural solutions. Neo-gothic was one of the most successful historicist styles, led by Viollet-le-Duc. Gaudí studied examples in Catalonia, the Balearic Islands and Roussillon in depth, as well as Leonese and Castilian buildings during his stays in León and Burgos, and became convinced that it was an imperfect style, leaving major structural issues only partly resolved. In his works he eliminated the need of buttresses through the use of ruled surfaces, and abolished crenellations and excessive openwork.

Neo-gothic works

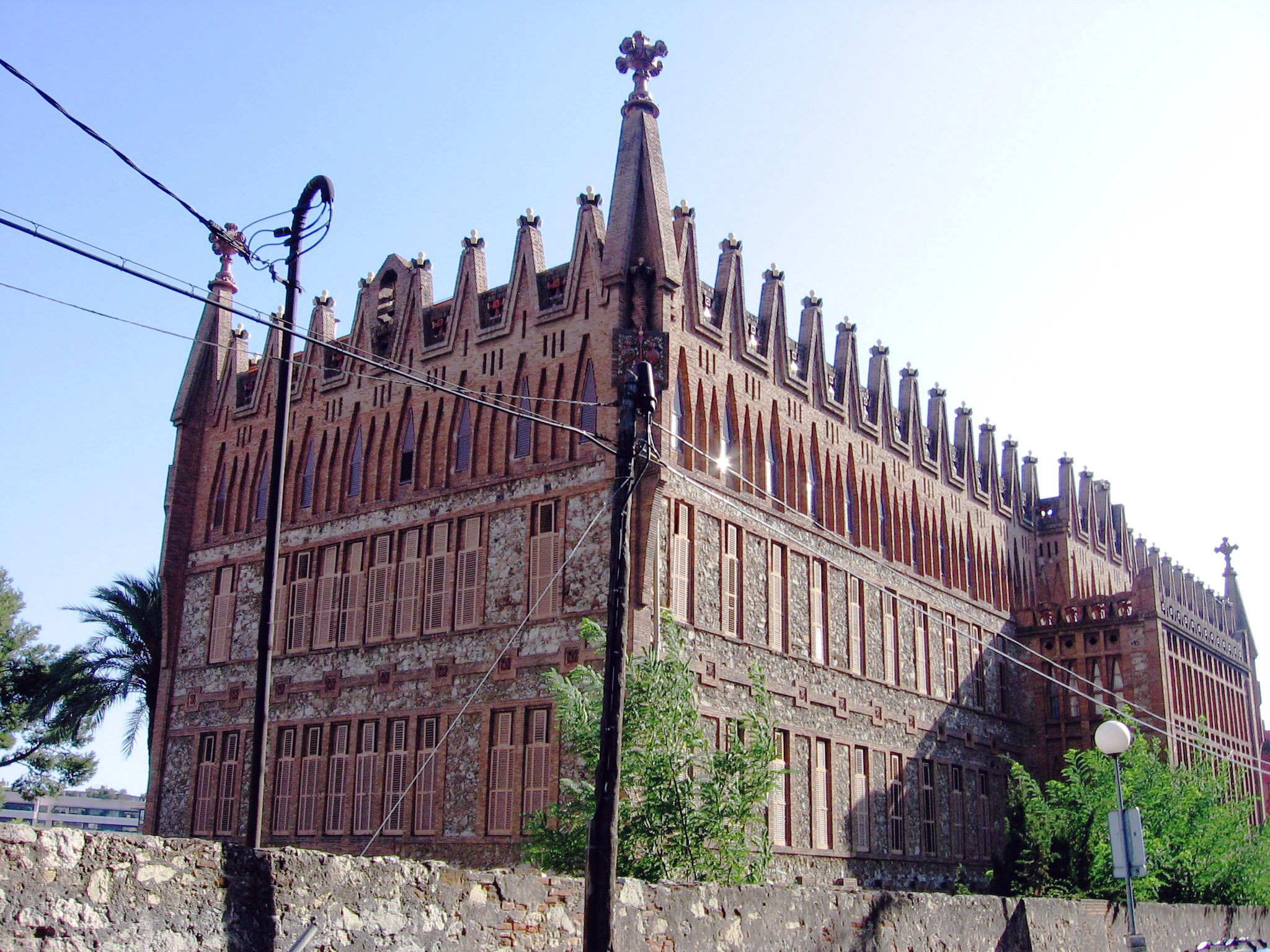
Teresian College

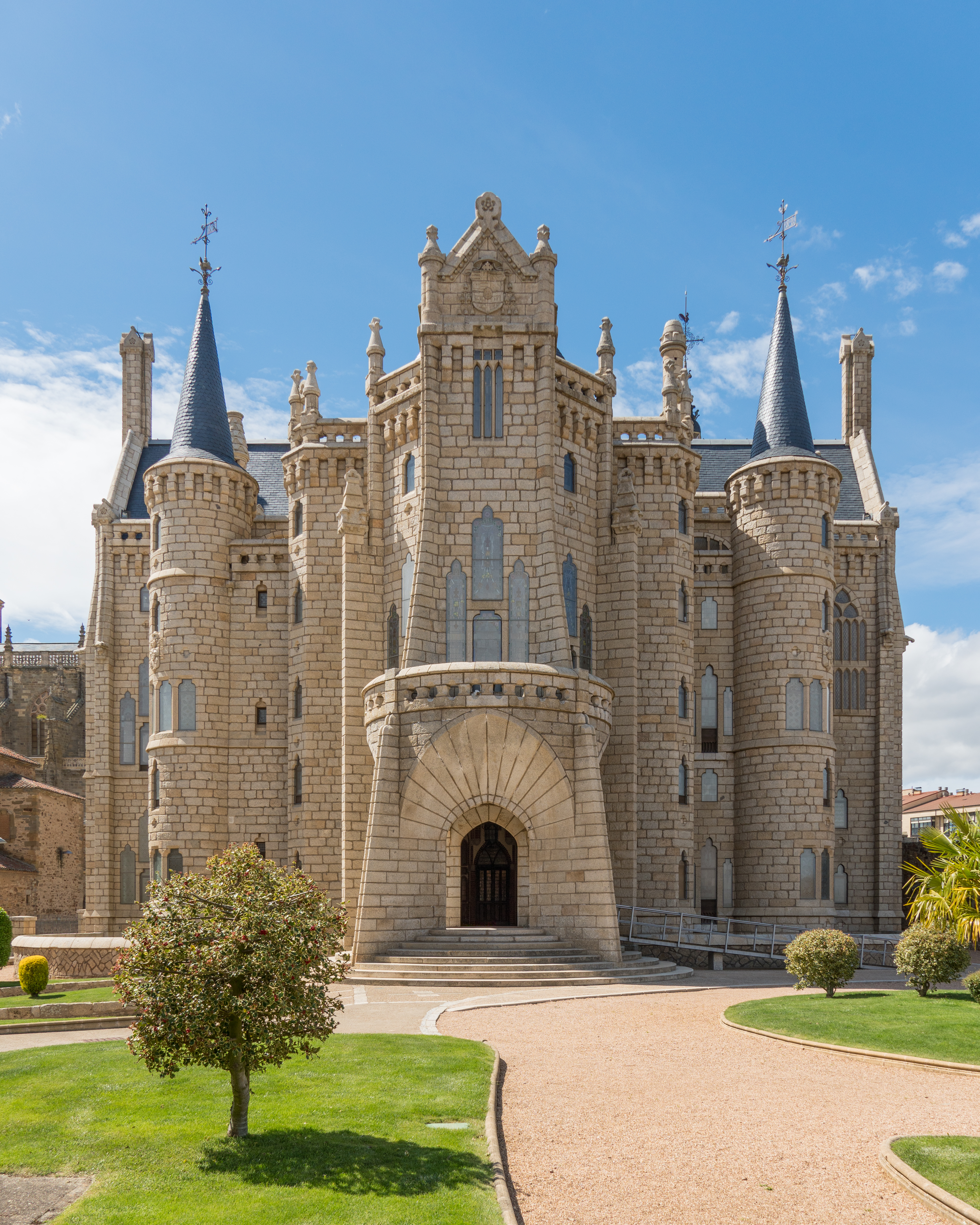
Episcopal Palace

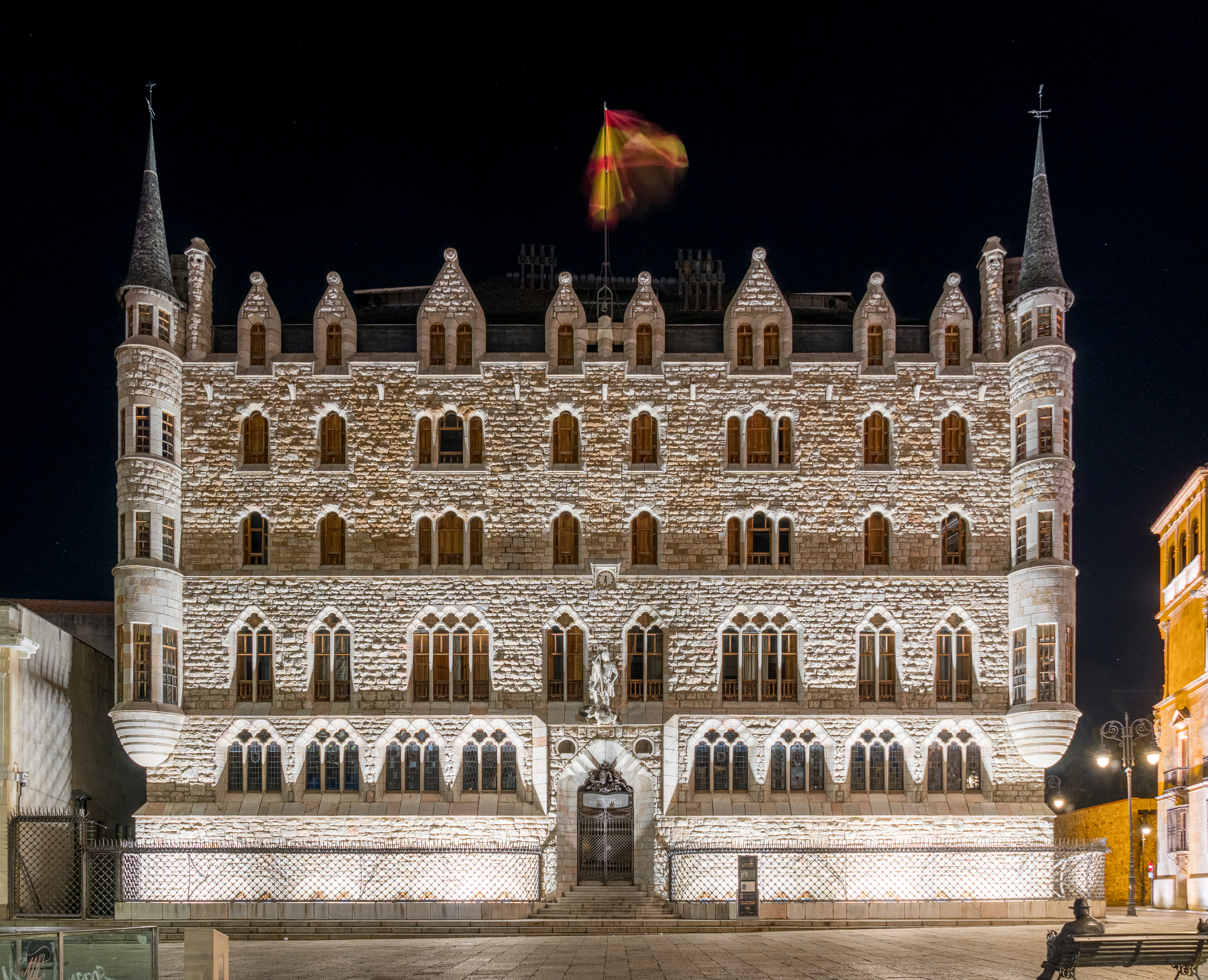
Casa Botines

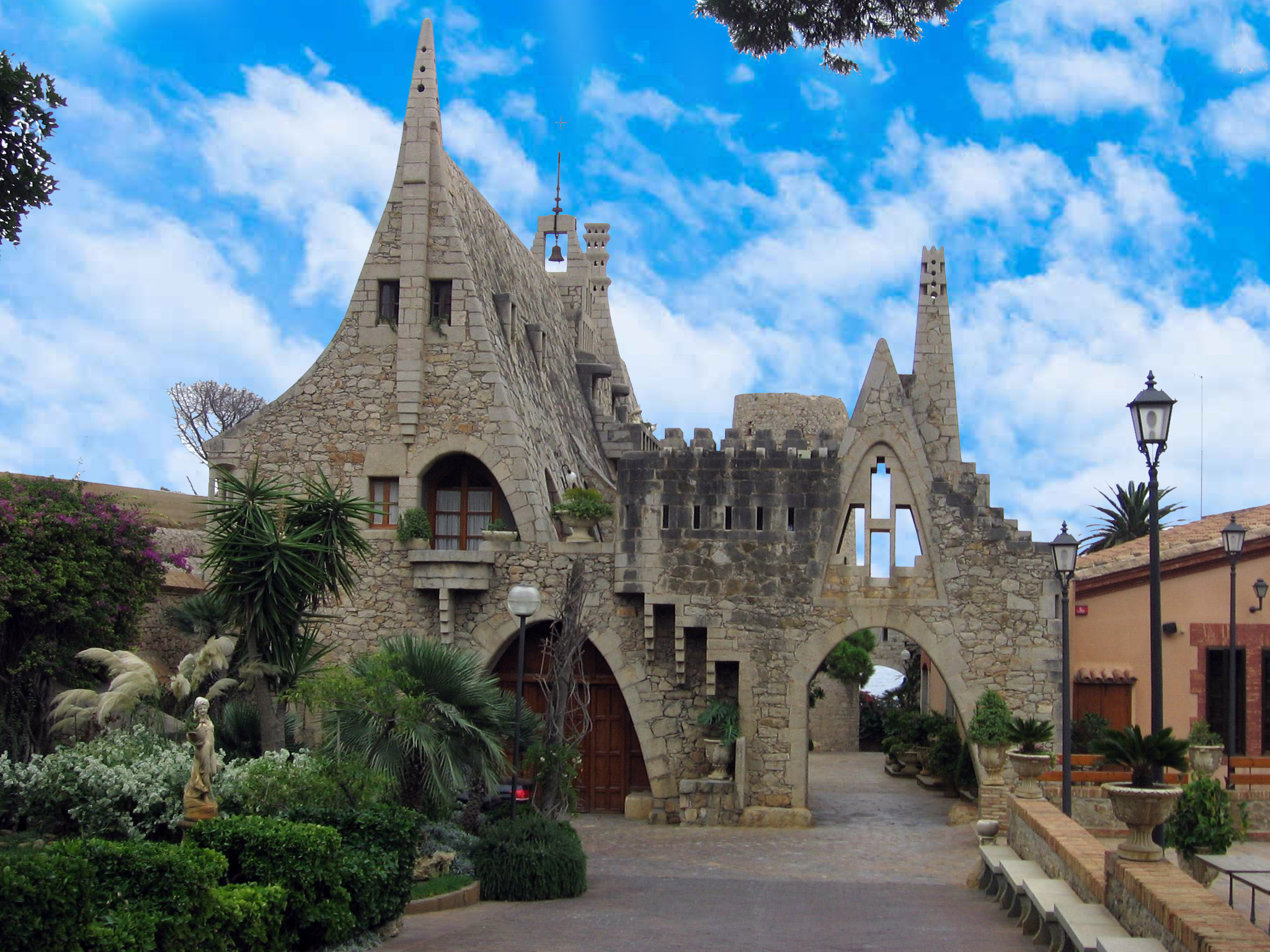
Bodegues Güell

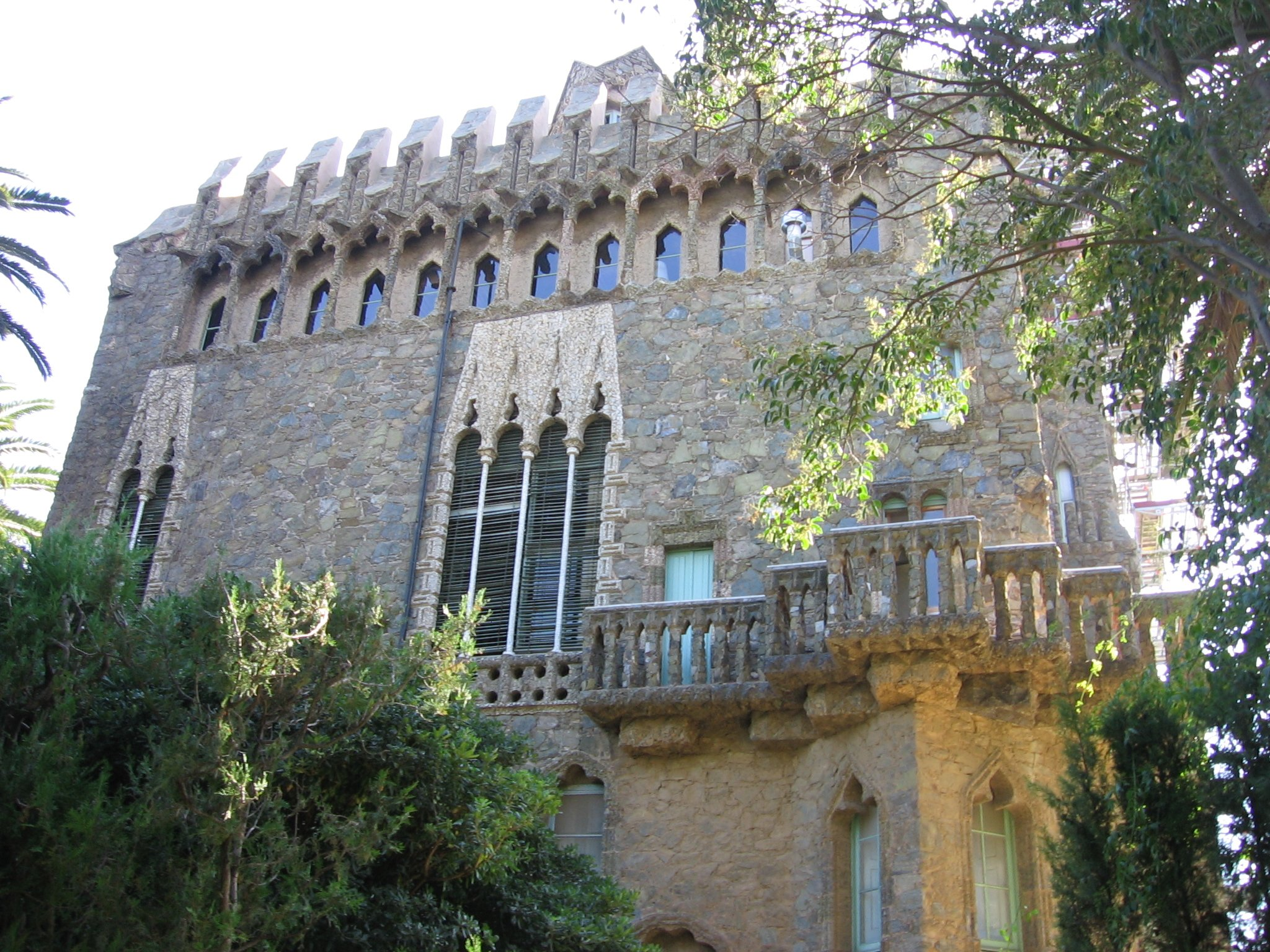
Torre Bellesguard

The first project was the ceiling Teresian College (Col·legi de les Teresianes) (1888–1889), in Barcelona's Carrer Ganduxer, commissioned by San Enrique de Ossó. Gaudí fulfilled the desire that the building be austere, in keeping with their vows of poverty. He designed a simple building, using bricks for the exterior and some brick elements for the interior. Wrought ironwork, one of Gaudí's favourite materials, appeared on the façades. The building is crowned by a row of merlons that suggest a castle, a possible reference to Saint Teresa's Interior Castle. The corners have brick pinnacles topped by helicoidal columns and culminate in a four-armed cross, typical of Gaudí's works, and with ceramic shields bearing various symbols of the order. The interior includes a corridor known for its series of catenary arches. These elegant arches support the ceiling and the floor above. For Gaudí, the catenary arch was an ideal constructional element, capable of supporting great loads with slender masonry.

Gaudí received his next commission from a clergyman who had been a boyhood friend in Reus. When appointed bishop of Astorga, Joan Baptista Grau i Vallespinós asked Gaudí to design an episcopal palace for the city, as the previous building had burned. Constructed between 1889 and 1915, in a neo-Gothic style with four cylindrical towers, it was surrounded by a moat. The stone (grey granite from the El Bierzo area) is in harmony with its surroundings, particularly with the cathedral in its immediate vicinity, as well as with the natural landscape, which in late 19th-century Astorga was more visible. The porch has three large flared arches, built of ashlar and separated by sloping buttresses. The structure is supported by columns with decorated capitals and by ribbed vaults on pointed arches, and topped with Mudejar-style merlons. Gaudí resigned from the project in 1893, at the death of Bishop Grau, due to disagreements with the Chapter, and it was finished in 1915 by Ricardo García Guereta. It currently houses a museum about the Way of Saint James, which passes through Astorga.

Another of Gaudí's projects outside of Catalonia was the Casa de los Botines, in León (1891–1894), commissioned by Simón Fernández Fernández and Mariano Andrés Luna, textile merchants from León, who were recommended Gaudí by Eusebi Güell, with whom they did business. Gaudí's project was a neo-Gothic style building, which bears his unmistakable modernista imprint. The building was used to accommodate offices and textile shops on the lower floors, as well as apartments on the upper floors. It was constructed with walls of solid limestone. The building is flanked by four cylindrical turrets surmounted by slate spires, and surrounded by an area with an iron grille. The Gothic façade style, with its cusped arches, has a clock and a sculpture of Saint George and the Dragon, the work of Llorenç Matamala. As of 2010 it was the headquarters of the Caja España.

In 1892 Gaudí was commissioned by Claudio López Bru, second Marquis of Comillas, with the Franciscana Catholic Missions for the city of Tangier, in Morocco (then a Spanish colony). The project included a church, hospital and school, and Gaudí conceived a quadrilobulate ground-plan floor structure, with catenary arches, parabolic towers, and hyperboloid windows. Gaudí deeply regretted the project's eventual demise, always keeping his design with him. The project influenced Sagrada Família, in particular the design of the towers, with their paraboloid shape like those of the Missions.

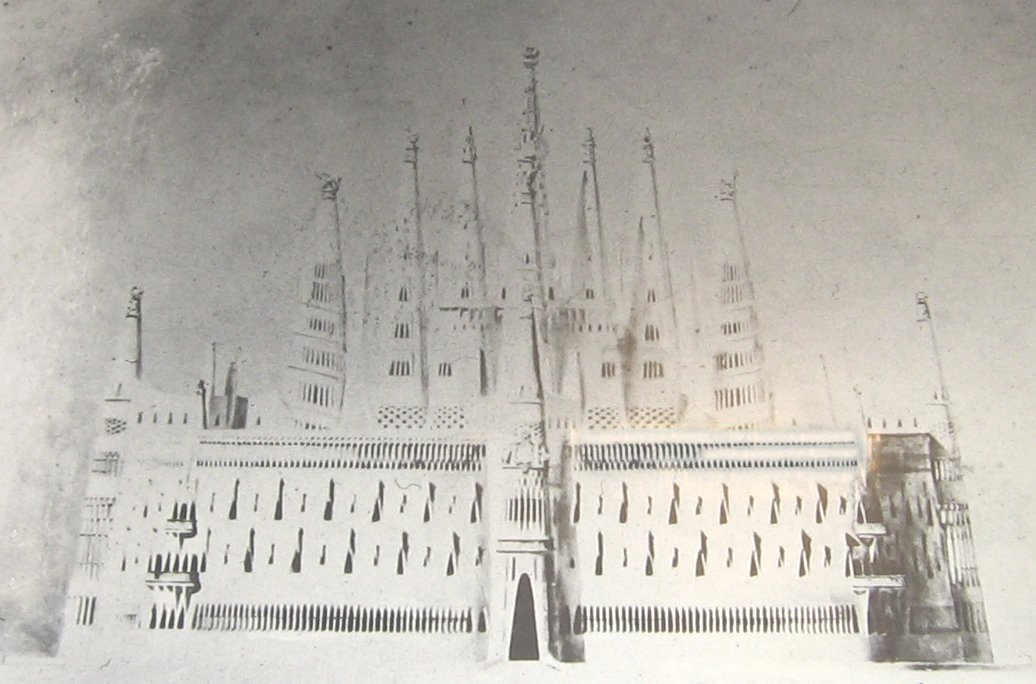
Franciscan Mission of Tangiers

In 1895 he designed a funerary chapel for the Güell family at the abbey of Montserrat, but little is known about this work, which was not built. That year, construction finally began on the Bodegas Güell, the 1882 project for a hunting lodge and some wineries at La Cuadra de Garraf (Sitges), property of Güell. Constructed between 1895 and 1897 under the direction of Francesc Berenguer, Gaudí's aide, the wineries have a triangular end façade, a steep stone roof, a group of chimneys and two bridges that join them to an older building. It has three floors: the bottom one for a garage, an apartment and a chapel with catenary arches, with the altar in the centre. It was completed with a porter's lodge, notable for the iron gate in the shape of a fishing net.

In the township of Sant Gervasi de Cassoles (now a district of Barcelona), the widow of Jaume Figueras commissioned Gaudí to renovate the Torre Bellesguard (1900–1909), former summer palace of King Martin I the Humane. Gaudí designed it in a neo-Gothic style, respecting the former building as much as possible, and tried to integrate the architecture into the natural surroundings. This influenced his choice of local slate for the construction. The building's ground-plan measures 15 x 15 metres, with the corners oriented to the four cardinal points. Constructed in stone and brick, it is taller than it is wide, with a spire topped with the four-armed cross, the Catalan flag and the royal crown. The house has a basement, ground floor, first floor and an attic, with a gable roof.

=== Naturalist period ===
During this period Gaudí perfected his personal style, inspired by the organic shapes of nature, putting into practise a series of structural solutions originating from his deep analysis of ruled geometry. To this he added a great creative freedom and an imaginative ornamental style. His works acquired a great structural richness, with shapes and volumes devoid of rational rigidity or any classic premise.

==== 1898–1900 ====
Commissioned by the company Hijos de Pedro Mártir Calvet, Gaudí built the Casa Calvet (1898–1899), in Barcelona's Carrer Casp. The façade is built of Montjuïc stone, adorned with wrought iron balconies and topped with two pediments with wrought iron crosses. Another notable feature of the façade is the gallery on the main floor, decorated with plant and mythological motifs. For this project, Gaudí used a Baroque style, visible in the use of Solomonic columns, decoration with floral themes and the design of the terraced roof. In 1900, he won the award for the best building of the year from Barcelona City Council.

A virtually unknown work by Gaudí is the Casa Clapés (1899–1900), at 125 Carrer Escorial, commissioned by painter Aleix Clapés, who collaborated on occasion with Gaudí, such as in decorating the Palau Güell and the Casa Milà. It has a ground floor and three apartments, with stuccoed walls and cast-iron balconies. Due to its lack of decoration or original structural solutions its authorship was unknown until 1976, when the architect's plans signed by Gaudí were discovered. In 1900, he renovated the house of Pere Santaló, at 32 Carrer Nou de la Rambla, a work of similar importance. Santaló was a friend of Gaudí's, whom he accompanied during his stay in Puigcerdà in 1911. It was he who recommended him to do manual work for his rheumatism.

Naturalist works (1898–1900)

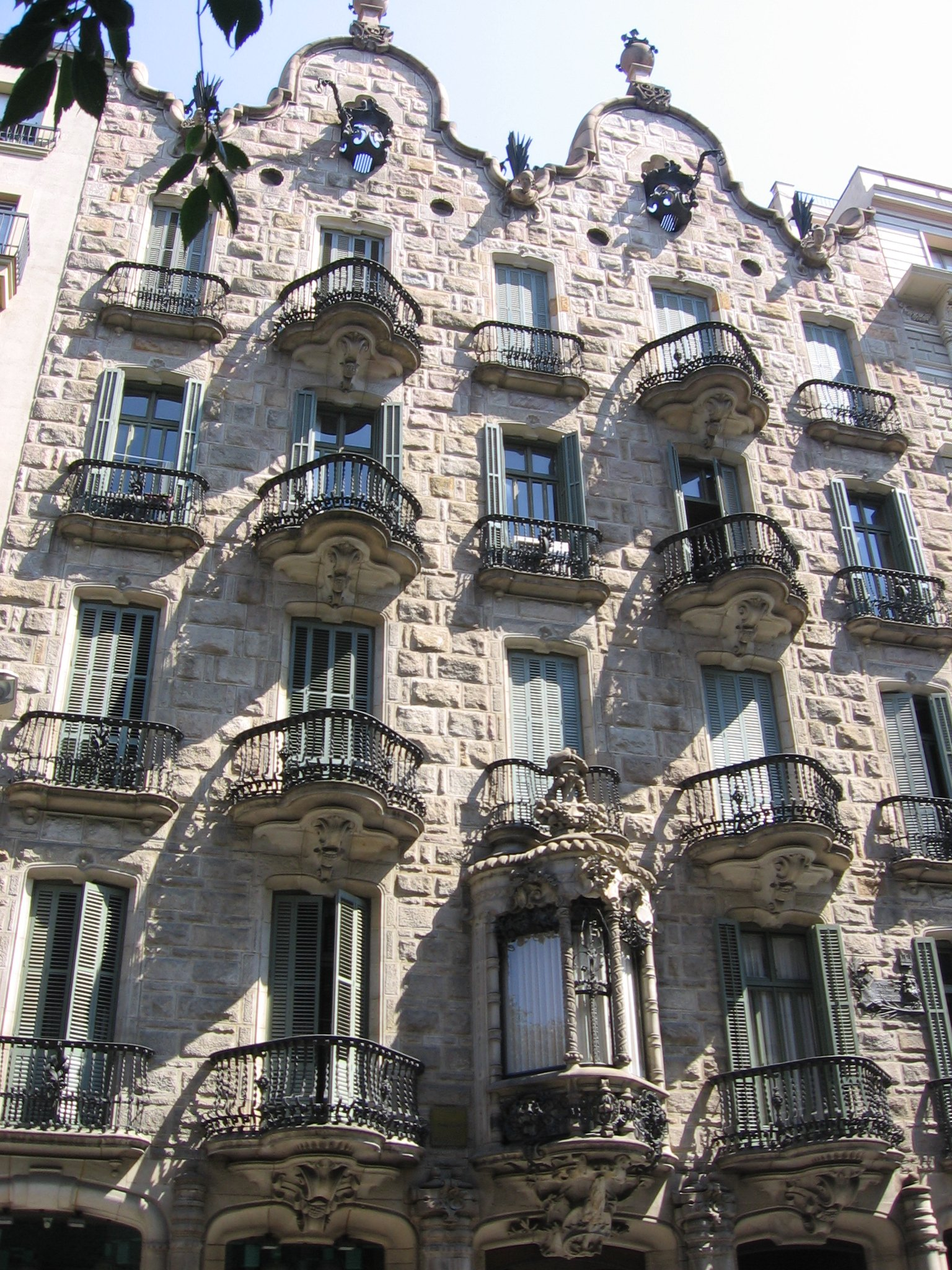
Casa Calvet

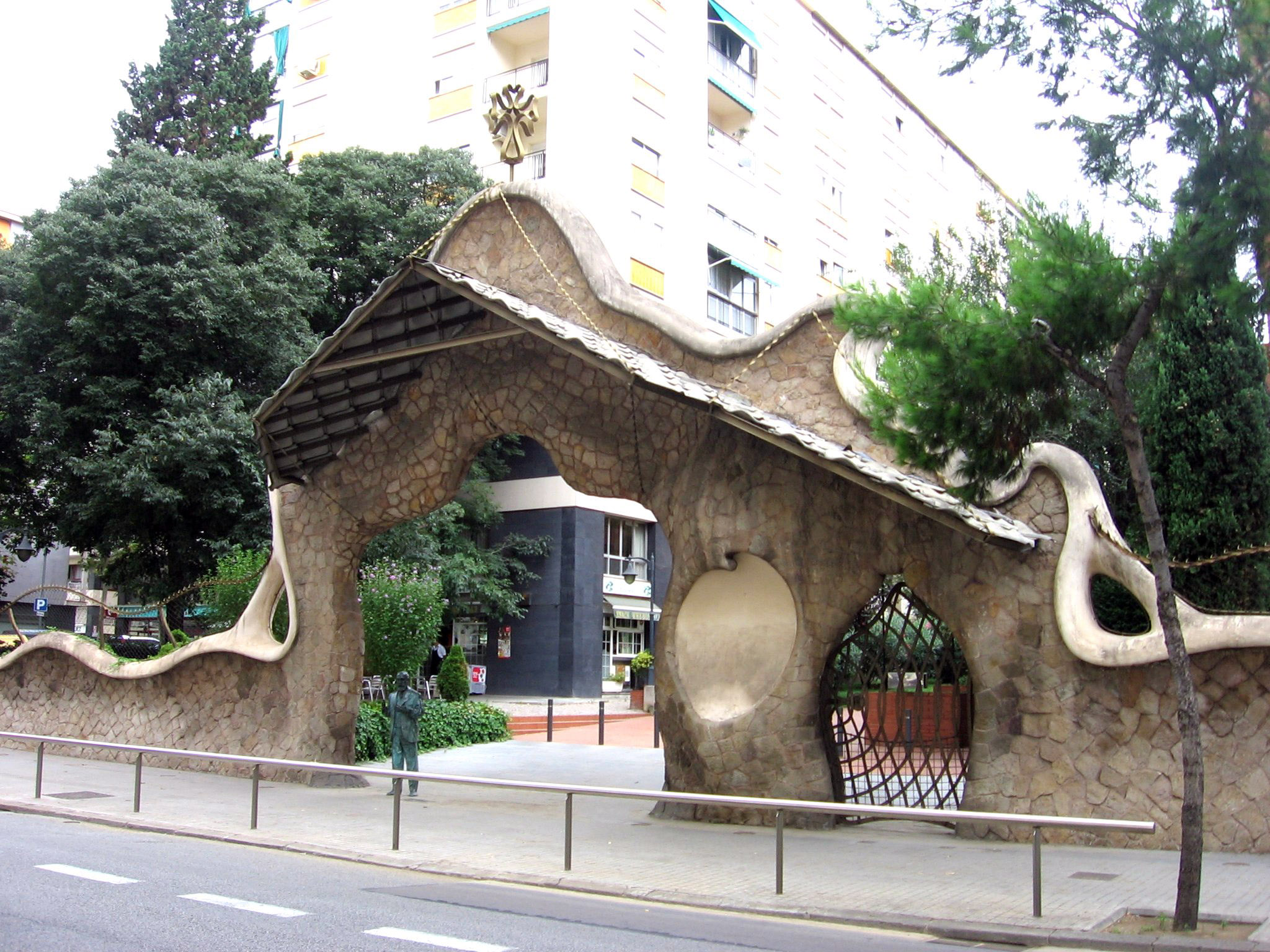
Finca Miralles

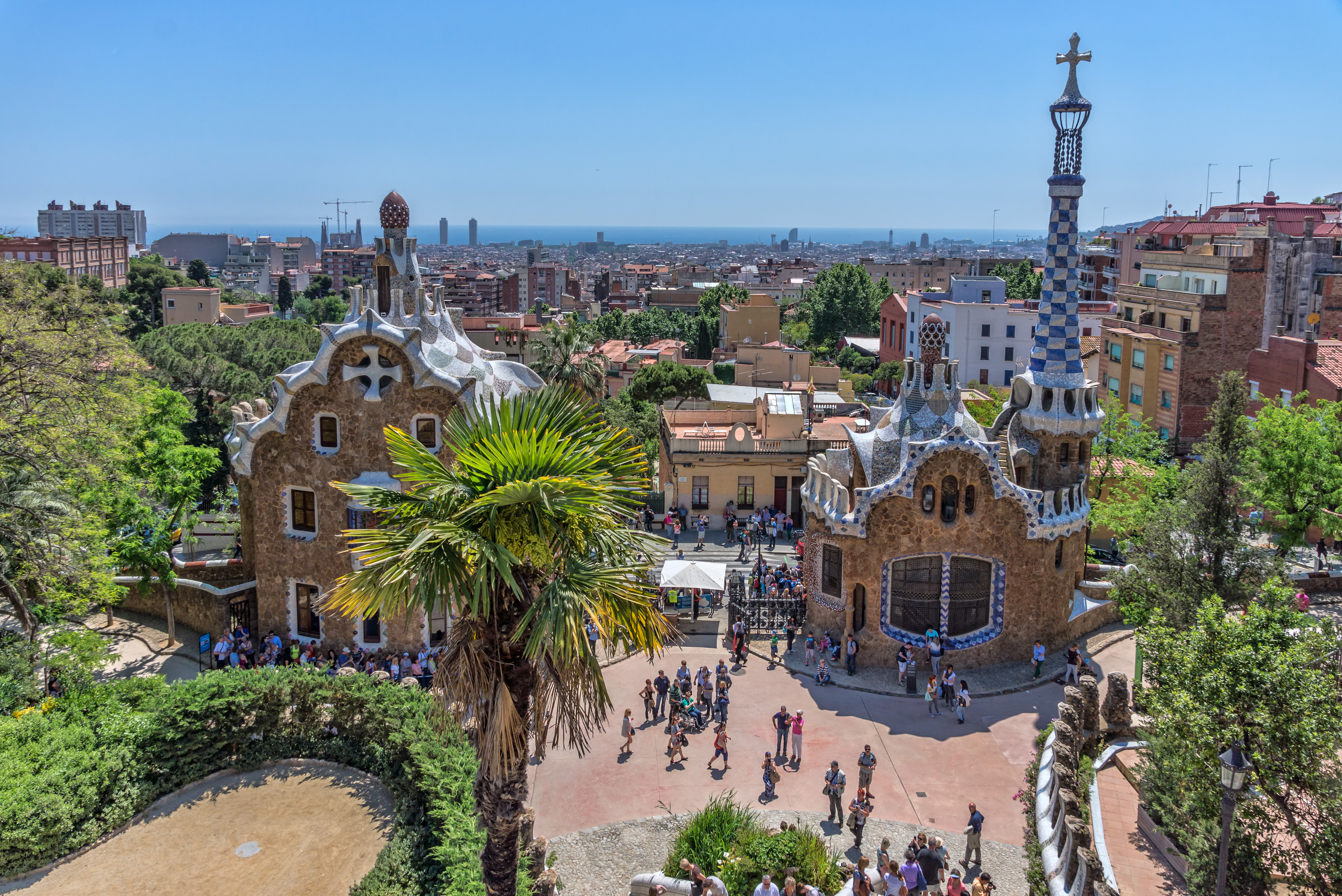
Park Güell

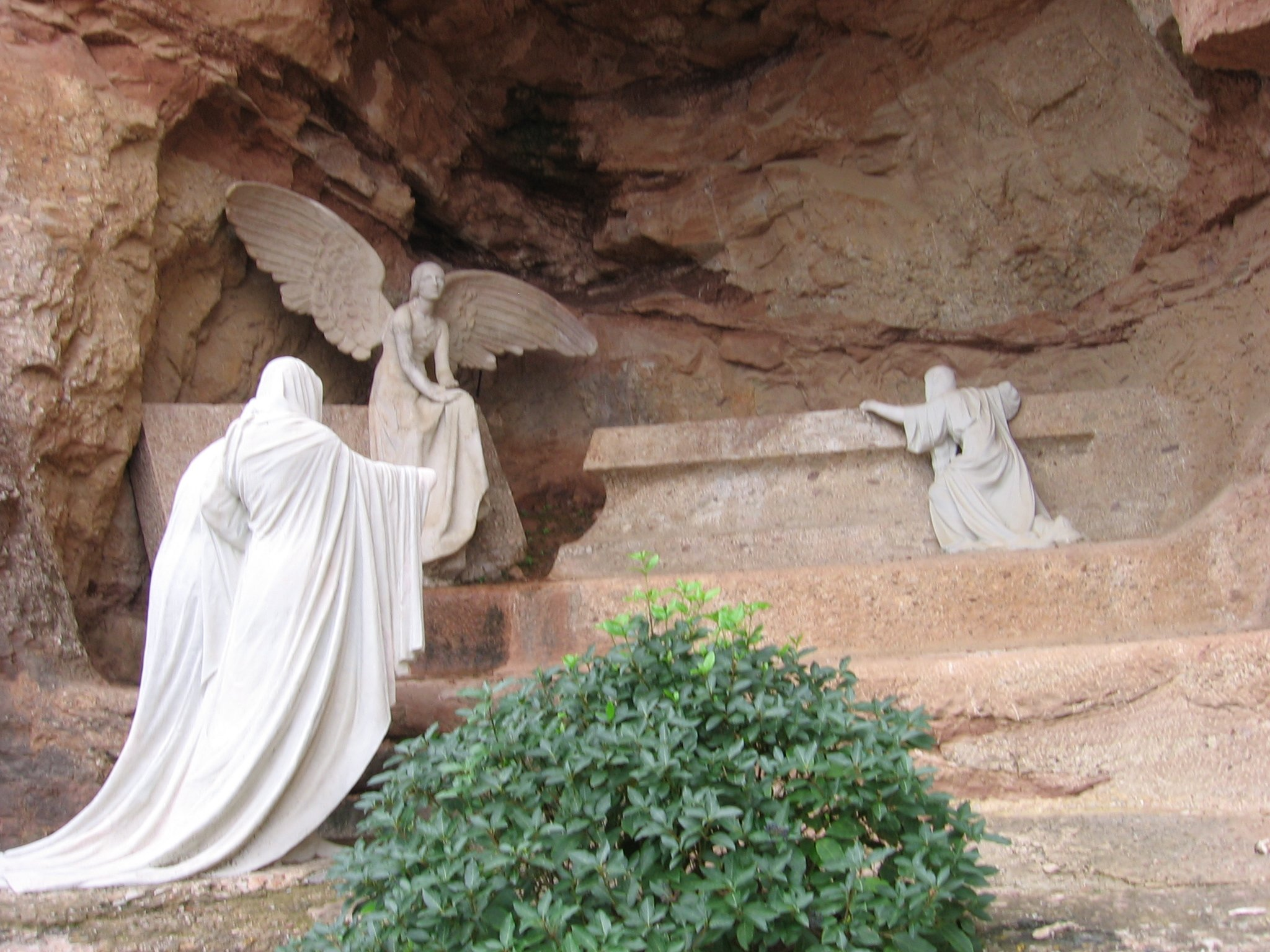
Rosary of Montserrat

Also in 1900, he designed two banners: for the Orfeó Feliuà (of Sant Feliu de Codines), made of brass, leather, cork and silk, with ornamental motifs based on the martyrdom of San Félix (a millstone), music (a staff and clef) and the inscription "Orfeó Feliuà"; and Our Lady of Mercy of Reus, for the pilgrimage of the Reus residents of Barcelona, with an image of Isabel Besora, the shepherdess to whom the Virgin appeared in 1592, work of Aleix Clapés and, on the back, a rose and the Catalan flag. In the same year, for the shrine of Our Lady of Mercy in Reus, Gaudí outlined a project for the renovation of the church's main façade, which ultimately was not undertaken, as the board considered it too expensive. Gaudí took this rejection quite badly, leaving some bitterness towards Reus, possibly the source of his subsequent claim that Riudoms was his place of birth. Between 1900 and 1902 Gaudí worked on the Casa Miralles, commissioned by industrialist Hermenegild Miralles i Anglès; Gaudí designed only the wall near the gateway, of undulating masonry, with an iron gate topped with the four-armed cross. Subsequently, the house for Señor Miralles was designed by Domènec Sugrañes, associate architect of Gaudí.

Gaudí's main new project at the beginning of the 20th century was the Park Güell (1900–1914), commissioned by Güell. It was intended to be a residential estate in the style of an English garden city. The project was unsuccessful: of the 60 plots into which the site was divided only one was sold (to Gaudi). Despite this, the park entrances and service areas were built, displaying Gaudí's genius and putting into practice his innovative structural solutions. Park Güell is situated in Barcelona's Càrmel district, a rugged area, with steep slopes that Gaudí negotiated with a system of viaducts integrated into the terrain. The main entrance to the park has a building on each side, intended as a porter's lodge and an office, and the site is surrounded by a stone and glazed-ceramic wall. These entrance buildings are an example of Gaudí at the height of his powers, with Catalan vaults that form a parabolic hyperboloid. After passing through the gate, steps lead to higher levels, decorated with sculpted fountains, notably the dragon fountain, which has become a symbol of the park and one of Gaudí's most recognised emblems. These steps lead to the Hypostyle Hall, which was to have been the residents' market, constructed with large Doric columns. Above this chamber is a large plaza in the form of a Greek theatre, with the famous undulating bench covered in broken ceramics (trencadís), the work of Josep Maria Jujol. The park's show home, the work of Francesc Berenguer, was Gaudí's residence from 1906 to 1926, and later came to house the Gaudi House Museum (Catalan: Casa-Museu Gaudí).

During this period Gaudí contributed to a group project, the Rosary of Montserrat (1900–1916). Located on the way to the Holy Cave of Montserrat, it was a series of groups of sculptures that evoked the mysteries of the Virgin, who tells the rosary. This project involved the best architects and sculptors of the era, and is a curious example of Catalan Modernism. Gaudí designed the First Mystery of Glory, which represents the Holy Sepulcher. The series include a statue of Christ Risen, the work of Josep Llimona, and the Three Marys sculpted by Dionís Renart. Another monumental project designed by Gaudí for Montserrat was not carried out: it would have included crowning the summit of El Cavall Bernat (one of the mountain peaks) with a viewpoint in the shape of a royal crown, incorporating a 20 metres (66 ft) high Catalan coat of arms into the wall.

==== 1901–1903 ====
In 1901 Gaudí decorated the house of Isabel Güell i López, Marchioness of Castelldosrius, and daughter of Eusebi Güell. Situated at 19 Carrer Junta de Comerç, the house had been built in 1885 and renovated between 1901 and 1904; it was destroyed by a bomb during the Civil War. The following year Gaudí took part in the decoration of the Bar Torino, property of Flaminio Mezzalana, located at 18 Passeig de Gràcia; Gaudí designed the ornamentation of el Salón Árabe of that establishment, made with varnished Arabian-style cardboard tiles (which no longer exist).

A project of interest to Gaudí was the restoration of the Cathedral of Santa Maria in Palma de Mallorca (1903–1914), commissioned by the city's bishop, Pere Campins i Barceló, thanks to the influence and guidance of the prebyster and poet Miquel Costa i Llobera. Gaudí planned a series of works including removing the baroque altarpiece, revealing the bishop's throne, moving the choir-stalls from the centre of the nave and placing them in the presbytery, clearing the way through chapel of the Holy Trinity, placing new pulpits, fitting the cathedral with electrical lighting, uncovering the Gothic windows of the Royal Chapel and filling them with stained glass, placing a large canopy above the main altar and completing the decoration with paintings. This was coordinated by Joan Rubió i Bellver, Gaudí's assistant. Josep Maria Jujol and the painters Joaquín Torres García, Iu Pascual and Jaume Llongueras were also involved. Gaudí abandoned the project in 1914 due to disagreements with the Cathedral chapter.

==== 1904 ====
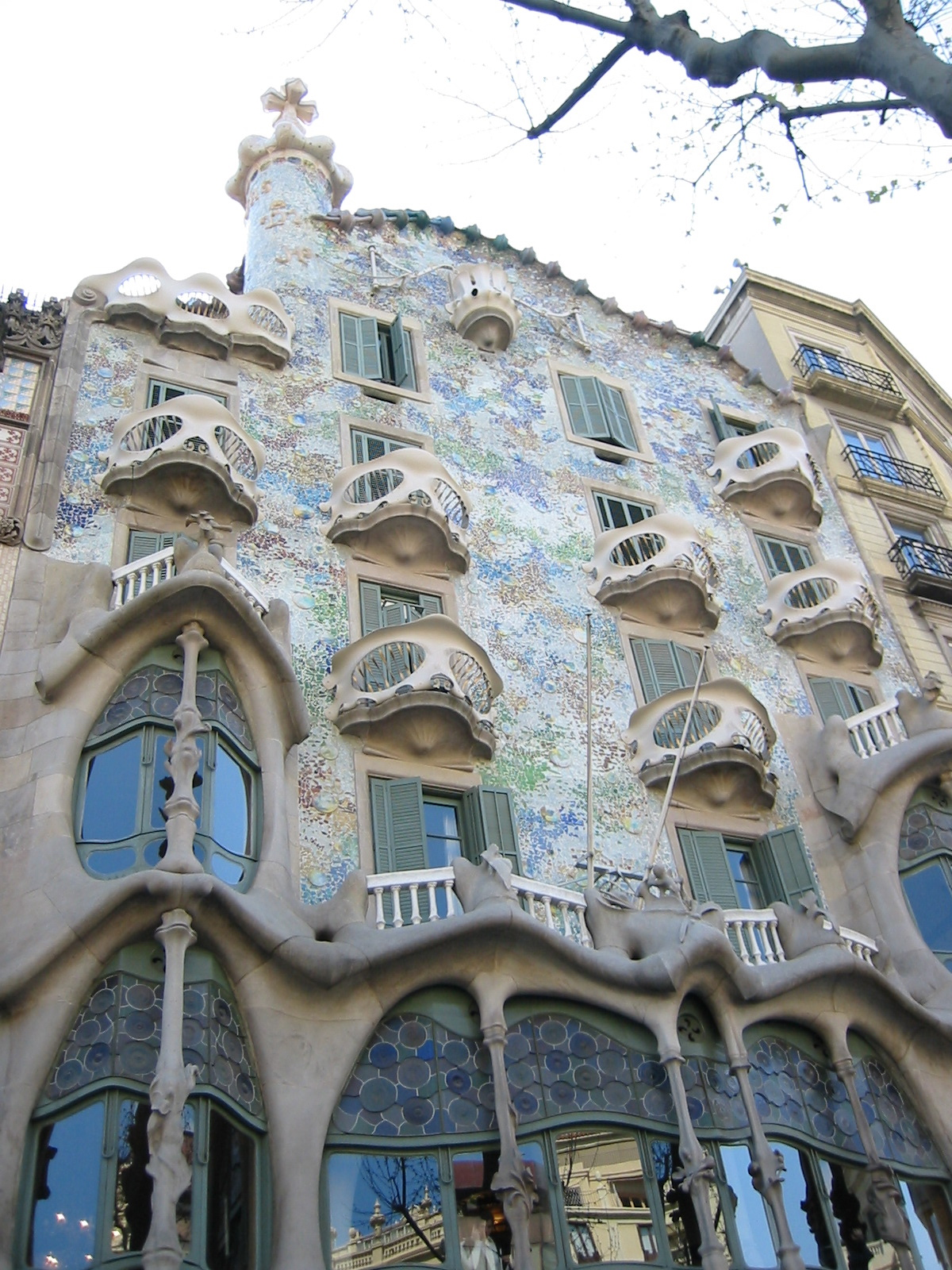
Casa Batlló

Among Gaudí's largest and most striking works is the Casa Batlló (1904–1906). Commissioned by Josep Batlló i Casanovas to renovate an existing building erected in 1875 by Emili Sala Cortés, Gaudí focused on the façade, the main floor, the patio and the roof, and built a fifth floor for the staff. For this project he was assisted by his aides Domènec Sugrañes, Joan Rubió and Josep Canaleta. The façade is of Montjuïc sandstone cut to create warped ruled surfaces; the columns are bone-shaped with vegetable decoration. Gaudí kept the rectangular shape of the old building's balconies—with iron railings in the shape of masks—giving the rest of the façade an ascending undulating form. He also faced the façade with trencadís, which Gaudí obtained from the waste material of the Pelegrí glass works. The interior courtyard is roofed by a skylight supported by an iron structure in the shape of a double T, which rests on a series of catenary aches. The helicoidal chimneys are a notable feature of the roof, topped with conical caps, covered in clear glass in the centre and ceramics at the top, and surmounted by clear glass balls filled with sand of different colours. The façade culminates in catenary vaults covered with two layers of brick and faced with glazed ceramic tiles in the form of scales (in shades of yellow, green and blue), which resemble a dragon's back; on the left side is a cylindrical turret with anagrams of Jesus, Mary and Joseph, and with Gaudí's four-armed cross.

In 1904–1905, commissioned by the painter Lluís Graner, he designed the decoration of the Sala Mercè, in the Rambla dels Estudis, one of Barcelona's first cinemas; the theatre imitated a cave, inspired by the Coves del Drac (Dragon's Caves) in Mallorca. Also for Graner he designed a detached house in the Bonanova district, of which only the foundations and the main gate were built, with three openings: for people, vehicles and birds; the building would have had a structure similar to the Casa Batlló or the porter's lodge of the Park Güell.

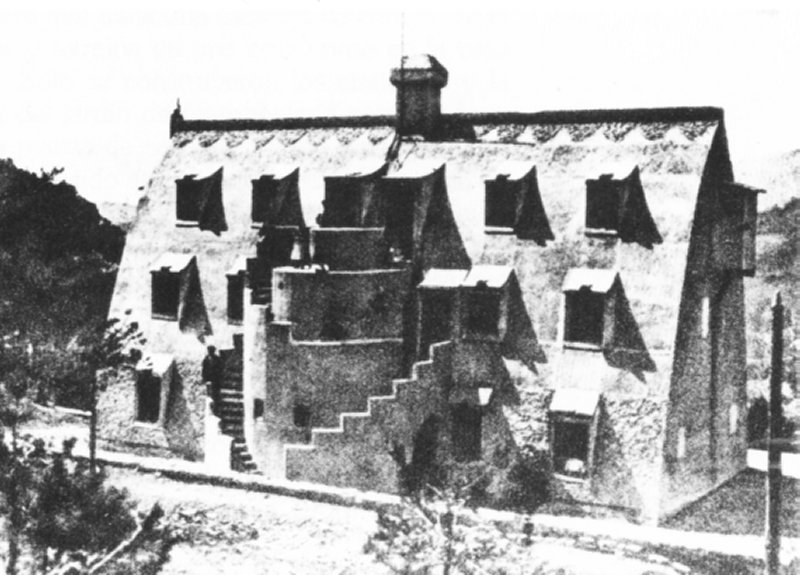
El chalet de Catllaràs (1905), in La Pobla de Lillet

The same year he built a workshop, the Taller Badia, for Josep and Lluís Badia Miarnau, blacksmiths who worked for Gaudí on several of his works, such as the Batlló and Milà houses, Park Güell and Sagrada Família. Located at 278 Carrer Nàpols, it was a simple stone building. Around that time he designed hexagonal hydraulic floor tiles for Casa Batlló, they were eventually used instead for the Casa Milà; they were a green colour and were decorated with seaweed, shells and starfish. These tiles were subsequently chosen to pave Barcelona's Passeig de Gràcia.

Also in 1904 he built the Chalet de Catllaràs, in La Pobla de Lillet, for the Asland cement factory, owned by Güell. It has a simple though original structure, in the shape of a pointed arch, with two semi-circular flights of stairs leading to the top two floors. This building fell into ruin when the cement works closed, and when it was eventually restored, its appearance was radically altered, the ingenious original staircase replaced with a simpler metal one. In the same area he created the Can Artigas Gardens between 1905 and 1907, in an area called Font de la Magnesia, commissioned by textile merchant Joan Artigas i Alart; men who had worked on Park Güell were involved on this project, similar to the famous park in Barcelona.

==== 1906 ====
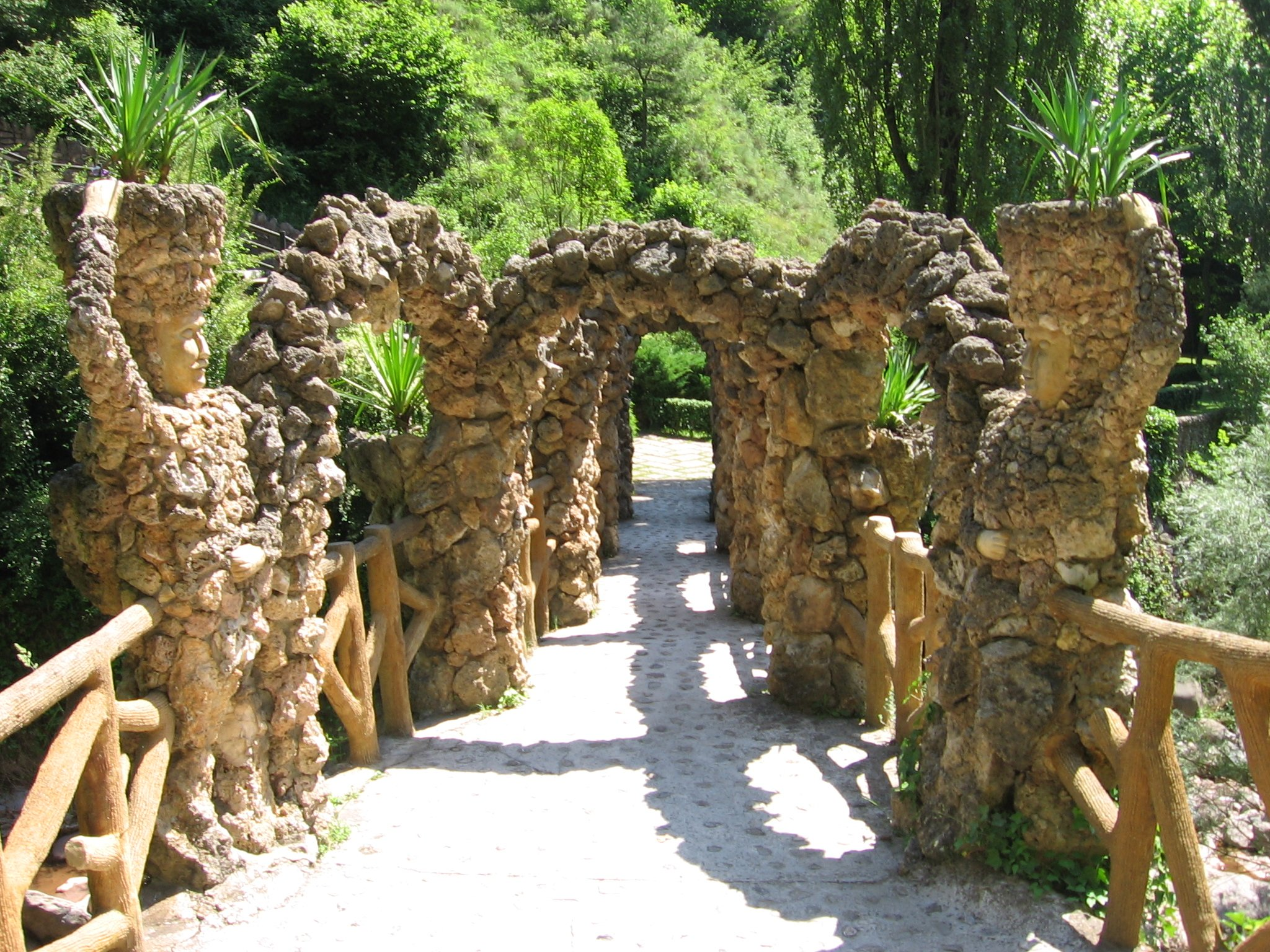
Artigas Gardens, in La Pobla de Lillet

In 1906 he designed a bridge over the Torrent de Pomeret, between Sarrià and Sant Gervasi. This river flowed directly between two of Gaudí's works, Bellesguard and the Chalet Graner, and so he was asked to bridge the divide. Gaudí designed an interesting structure composed of juxtaposed triangles that would support the bridge's framework, following the style of the viaducts that he made for Park Güell. It would have been built with cement, and would have had a length of 154 metres (505 ft) and a height of 15 metres (49 ft); the balustrade would have been covered with glazed tiles, with an inscription dedicated to Santa Eulàlia. The project was not approved by the Town Council of Sarrià.

The same year Gaudí apparently took part in the construction of the Torre Damià Mateu, in Llinars del Vallès in collaboration with Berenguer, although the project's authorship is not clear or to what extent they each contributed to it. The style evokes Gaudí's early work, such as Casa Vicens or Güell Pavilions; it had an entrance gate in the shape of a fishing net, later installed in Park Güell. The building was demolished in 1939. Also in 1906 he designed a new banner, this time for the Guild of metalworkers and blacksmiths for the Corpus Christi procession of 1910, in Barcelona Cathedral. It was dark green, with Barcelona's coat of arms in the upper left corner, and an image of Saint Eligius, patron of the guild, with typical tools of the trade. The banner was burned in July 1936.

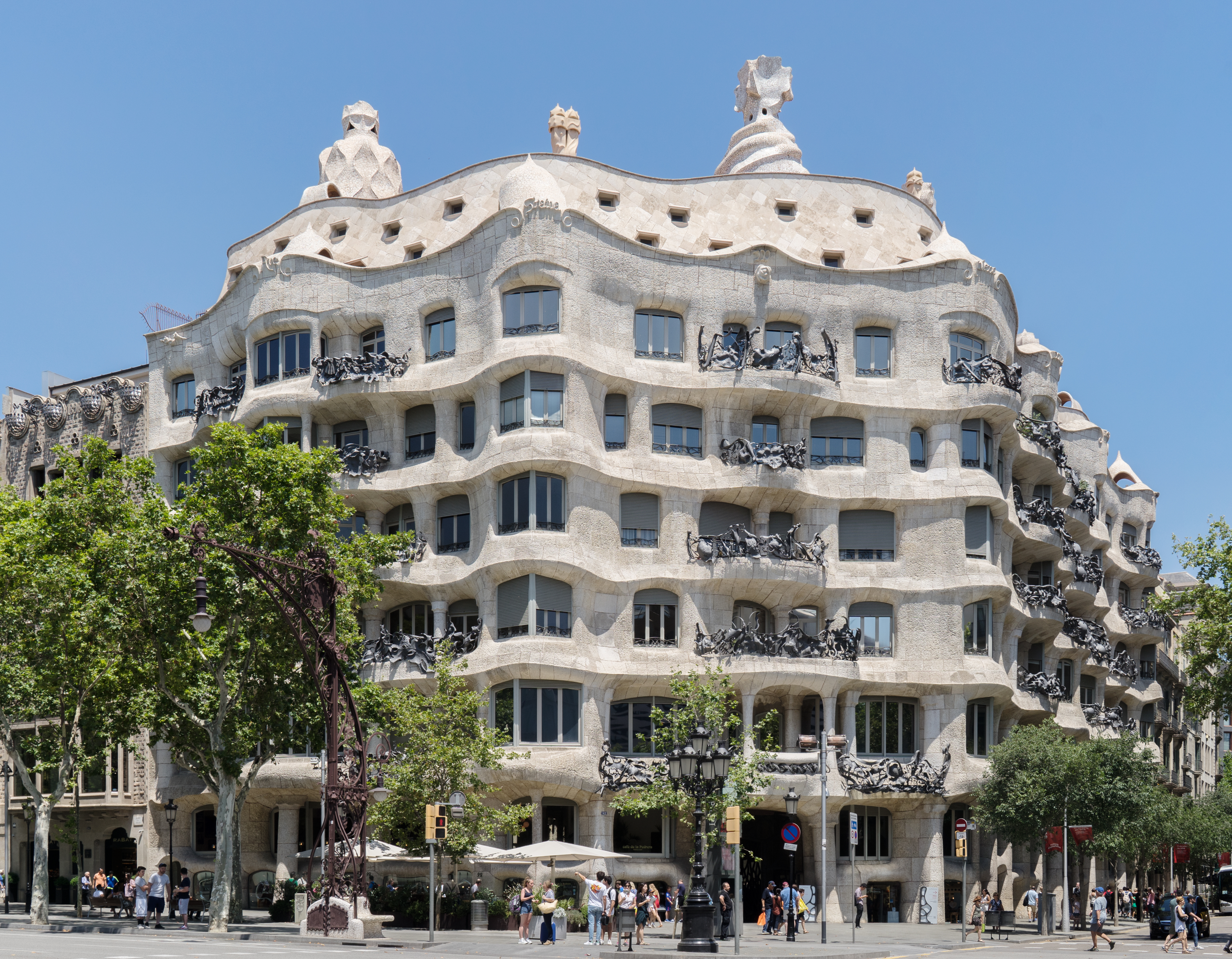
Casa Milà (La Pedrera)

Another of Gaudí's major projects and among his most admired works is the Casa Milà, better known as La Pedrera (1906–1912), commissioned by Pere Milà i Camps. Gaudí designed the house around two large, curved courtyards, one circular and one oval, with a structure of stone, brick and cast-iron columns and steel beams. The façade uses limestone from Vilafranca del Penedès, apart from the upper level, which is covered in white tiles, evoking a snowy mountain. It has five floors, plus a loft made entirely of catenary arches. Notable features are the staircases to the roof, topped with the four-armed cross, and the chimneys, covered in ceramics and with shapes that suggest mediaeval helmets. The interior decoration was carried out by Josep Maria Jujol and painters Iu Pascual, Xavier Nogués and Aleix Clapés. The façade was to have been completed with a stone, metal and glass sculpture with Our Lady of the Rosary accompanied by the archangels Michael and Gabriel, 4m in height. A sketch was made by the sculptor Carles Mani, but due to the events of the Tragic Week in 1909 the sculpture was abandoned.

==== 1907–1908 ====
In 1907, to mark the seventh centenary of the birth of King James I, Gaudí designed a monument in his memory. It would have been situated in the Plaça del Rei, and would have also involved the renovation of the adjacent buildings: new roof for the cathedral, completion of its towers and cupola; placement of three vases above the buttresses of the Chapel of Santa Àgada, dedicated to the Litany of the Blessed Virgin Mary, an angel placed on top of the chapel's tower; finally, the opening of a large square next to the walls (now the Plaça Ramon Berenguer el Grand). The project was not executed because the city council disliked it.

In 1908 Gaudí devised a project for a skyscraper hotel in New York City, the Hotel Attraction, commissioned by two American entrepreneurs whose names are unknown. It would have been 360 metres (1,180 ft) high (taller than the Empire State Building), with a taller parabolic central section, topped with a star, and flanked by four volumes containing museums, art galleries and concert halls, with shapes similar to Casa Milà. Inside it would have had five large rooms, one for each continent.

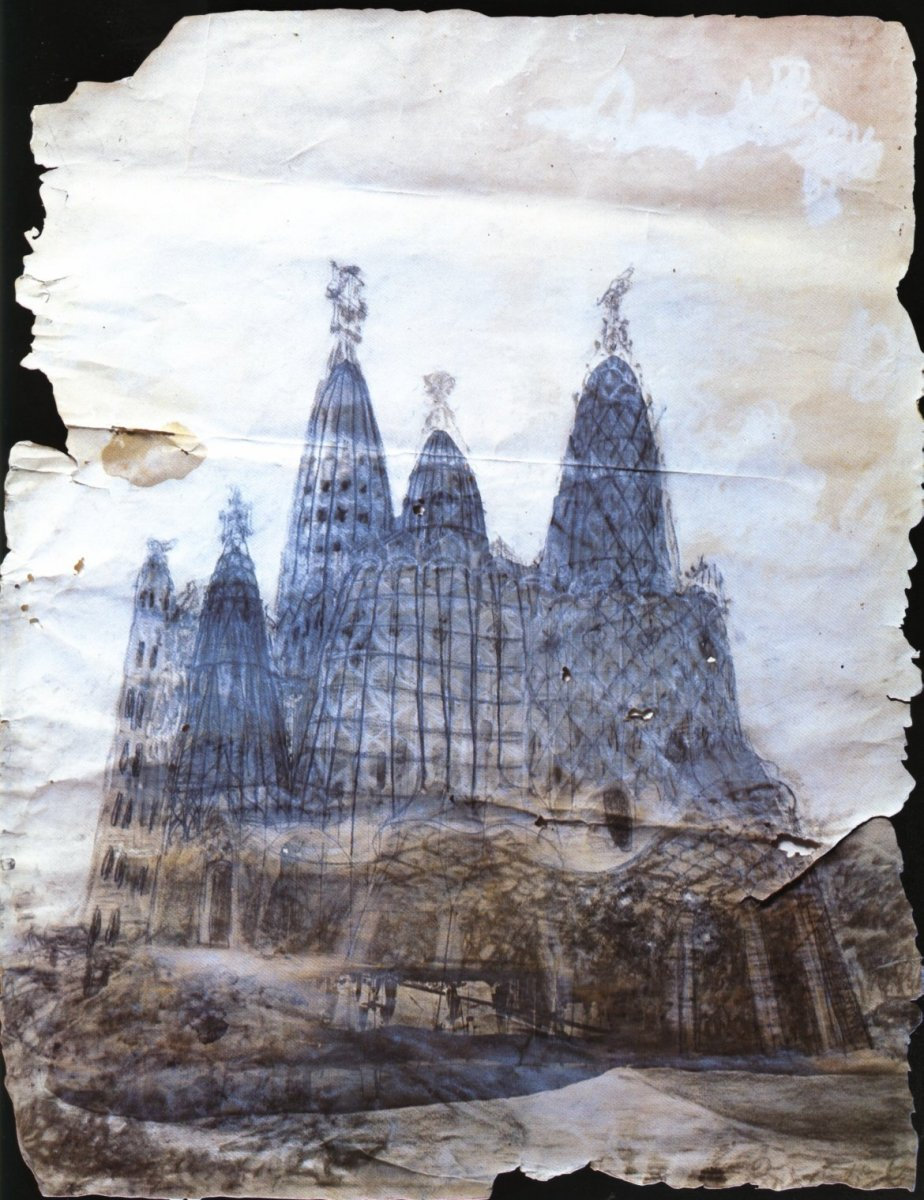
Original design of the church for the Colònia Güell

The final project for Güell was the church for the Colònia Güell, an industrial village in Santa Coloma de Cervelló (1890–1918). The project began in 1890, and the factory, service buildings and housing for the workers were constructed. What would have been the colony's church was designed by Gaudí in 1898, though the first stone was not laid until 4 October 1908. Unfortunately only the crypt (known today as Crypt of Colònia Güell) was built, as Güell's sons abandoned the project after his death in 1918. Gaudí designed an oval church with five aisles, one central aisle and two at either side. He conceived it as fully integrated into nature. A porch of hyperbolic paraboloid vaults precedes the crypt, the first time that Gaudí used this structure and notably the first use of paraboloid vaults in the history of architecture. In the crypt the large hyperboloid stained glass windows stand out, with the shapes of flower petals and butterfly wings. Inside, circular brick pillars alternate with slanted basalt columns from Castellfollit de la Roca.

=== Final period ===
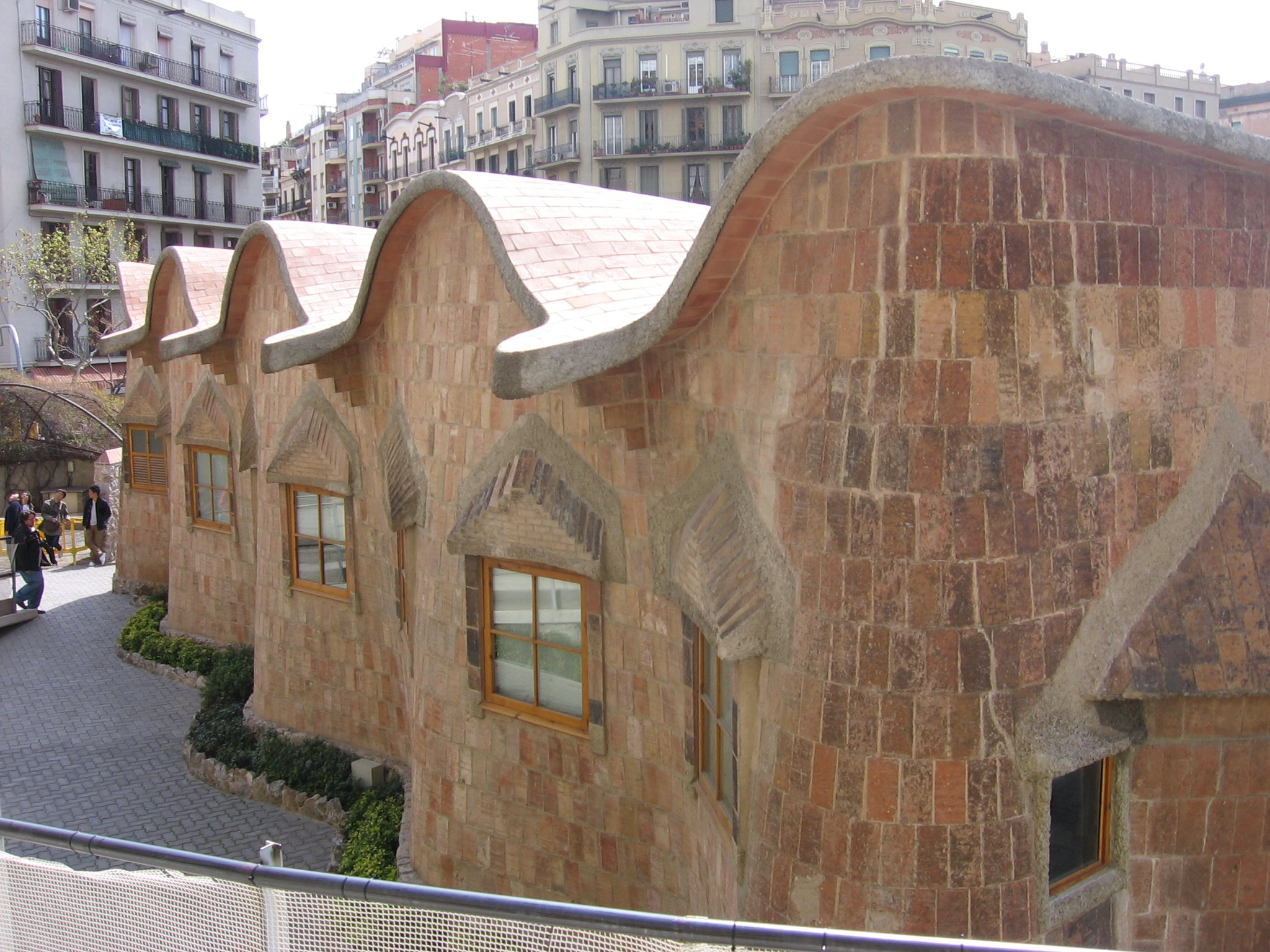
Sagrada Família schools

During the last years of his career, dedicated almost exclusively to the Sagrada Família, Gaudí reached the culmination of this naturalistic style, creating a synthesis of all of the solutions and styles he had tried until then. Gaudí achieved harmony between structural and ornamental elements, between plastic and aesthetic, between function and form, between container and content, achieving the integration of all arts in one structured, logical work.

The first example of this evolution can be seen in the Sagrada Família schools, a small school for the workers' children. Built in 1909, it has a rectangular ground plan of 10 by 20 metres (33 ft × 66 ft), and contained three classrooms, a vestibule and a chapel. It was built of exposed brick, in three overlapping layers, following the traditional Catalan method. The walls and roof have an undulating shape, giving the structure a sense of lightness and strength. Sagrada Família schools set an example of constructive genius and served as a source of inspiration for many architects, given their simplicity, strength, originality, functionality and geometric excellence.

In May 1910 Gaudí paid a short visit to Vic, where he was tasked to design the lampposts for the city's Plaça Major, in commemoration of the first centenary of the birth of Jaume Balmes. They were obelisk-shaped lamps, with basalt rock bases from Castellfollit de la Roca and wrought iron arms, topped with the four-armed cross; they were decorated with vegetable themes and included Balmes' birth and death dates. They were demolished in 1924 due to poor maintenance.

The same year, on the occasion of Eusebi Güell's accession to count, Gaudí designed a coat of arms for his patron. He devised a shield with the lower part in a catenary shape. He divided it into two parts: the lantern of Palau Güell features a dove and a gear-wheel on the right in allusion to the Colònia Güell in Santa Coloma de Cervelló (coloma is Catalan for dove), with the phrase ahir pastor (yesterday Shepherd). On the left is an owl perched on a half-moon—symbol of prudence and wisdom—with the words avuy senyor (today Lord). The shield is surmounted by a helmet with the count's coronet and the dove symbol of the Holy Spirit.

In 1912 he built two pulpits for the church of Santa Maria in Blanes: the pulpit on the Gospel side had a hexagonal base, decorated with the dove of the Holy Spirit and the names in Latin of the four evangelists and the seven Gifts of the Holy Spirit; the pulpit of the Epistle side had the names of the apostles who wrote epistles, with the three theological virtues and the flames of Pentecost. These pulpits were burned in July 1936.

==== La Sagrada Família ====
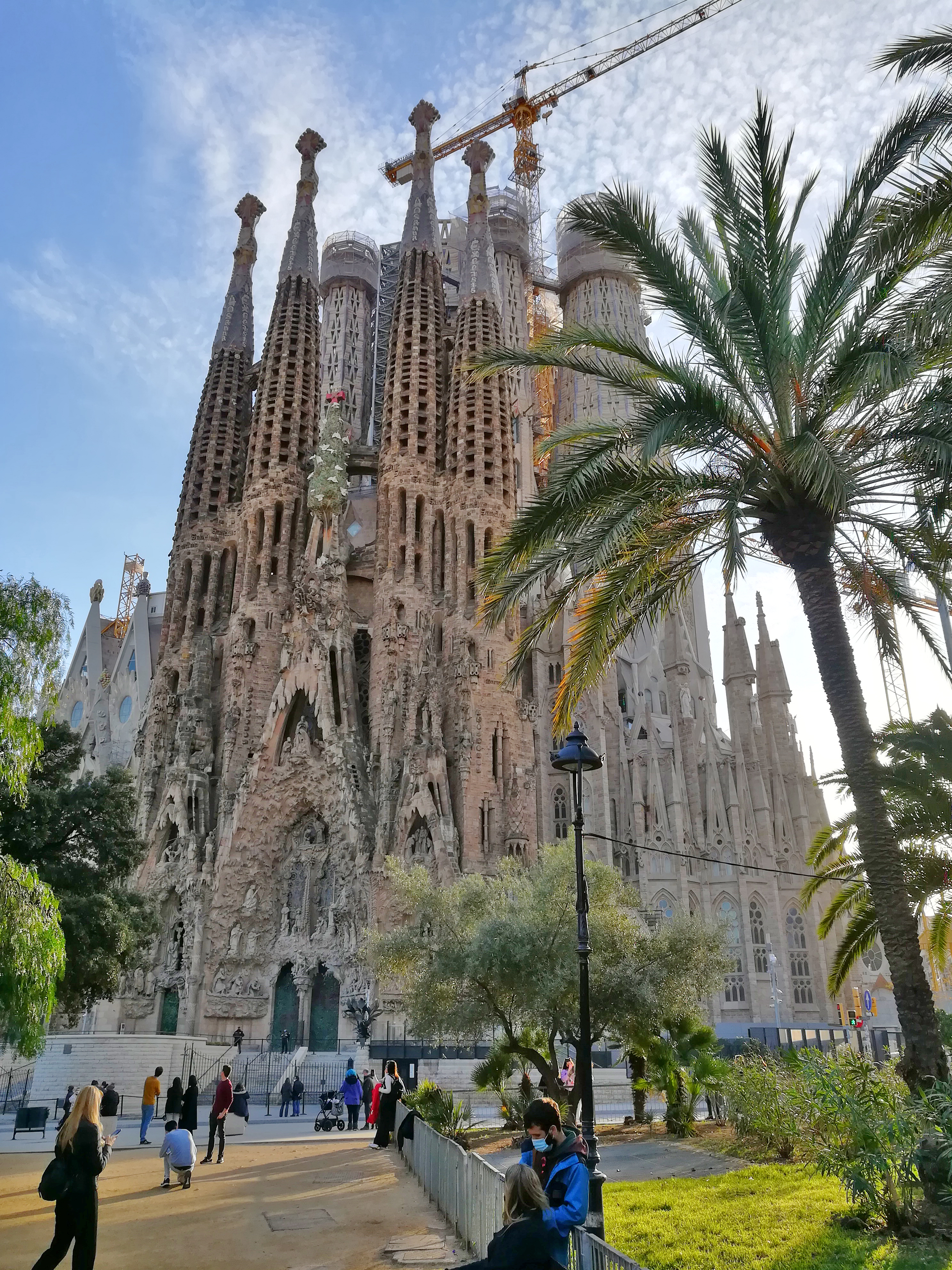
Temple Expiatori de la Sagrada Família in 2021

From 1915 Gaudí devoted himself almost exclusively to his magnum opus, La Sagrada Família. After completion of the crypt and the apse, still in Gothic style, he conceived the rest of the church in an organic style, imitating natural shapes. He intended the interior to resemble a forest, with inclined columns like branching trees, helicoidal in form, creating a simple yet sturdy structure. Gaudí applied his experimental findings to this project.

Sagrada Família has a cruciform plan, with a five-aisled nave, a transept of three aisles, and an apse with seven chapels. The design includes three façades dedicated to the birth, passion and glory of Jesus, and eighteen towers: four at each of the three facades, totaling twelve to represent the Apostles, four on the transept invoking the Evangelists and one on the apse dedicated to the Virgin, plus the central tower in honour of Jesus, to reach 172.5 metres (566 ft) in height. The church is to have two sacristies adjacent to the apse, and three large chapels: one for the Assumption in the apse, and the Baptism and Penitence chapels at the west end. A cloister is to surround it, designed for processions and to isolate the building from the exterior. Gaudí employed highly symbolic content in the Sagrada Família, both in architecture and sculpture, dedicating each part of the church to a religious theme.

During Gaudí's life only the crypt, apse and part of the Nativity façade were completed. Upon his death his assistant Domènec Sugrañes took over the construction; thereafter it was directed by various architects. Jordi Bonet i Armengol assumed responsibility in 1987 and continued as of 2011. Artists such as Llorenç and Joan Matamala, Carles Mani, Jaume Busquets, Joaquim Ros i Bofarull, Etsuro Sotoo and Josep Maria Subirachs (creator of the Passion façade) worked on the sculptural decoration. Completion is not expected before 2026.

==== Minor, late projects ====
In these years, Gaudí participated only in minor projects, which were not completed: in 1916, on the death of his friend bishop Josep Torras i Bages, he designed a monument in his honour, which he wanted to place in front of the Passion façade of Sagrada Família. He made a sketch of the project, which ultimately was not carried out, and made a plaster bust of the bishop, the work of Joan Matamala under the instruction of Gaudí. It was put in Sagrada Família, where it would have formed part of the church, but was destroyed in 1936. Another commemorative monument project, also not executed, was dedicated to Enric Prat de la Riba, to be situated in Castellterçol, birthplace of this Catalan politician. The project dates from 1918, and would have consisted of a tall tower with two porticos and a spire topped with an iron structure flying the Catalan flag. The sketch of the project was done by Lluís Bonet i Garí, Gaudí's assistant.

In 1922 Gaudí was commissioned, by the Franciscan Padre Angélico Aranda, to construct a church dedicated to the Assumption in the Chilean city of Rancagua. Gaudí apologised and said that he was occupied exclusively with Sagrada Família, but sent sketches of the Assumption chapel that he had designed for the apse of Sagrada Família, which more or less coincided with what Padre Aranda had asked for. The President of Chile, Michelle Bachelet, announced that building would begin in 2015, with an expected completion in 2017. It would become the first of Gaudí's works to be constructed in the Americas.

The same year Gaudí was consulted about the construction of a monumental train station for Barcelona (the future Estació de França). Gaudí suggested an iron structure in the form of a large suspended awning, a solution ahead of its time; perhaps for this reason, it put the head engineers off, and they declined Gaudí's offer. Gaudi's last known projects are the chapel for the Colònia Calvet in Torelló, of 1923, and a pulpit for Valencia (the exact location is unknown), of 1924. From then on, Gaudí worked exclusively on Sagrada Família until his death.

== Collaborators ==
Gaudí required the collaboration of many assistants, artists, architects and craftsmen to bring his designs to reality. Gaudí always led the way, but allowed his collaborators to express their individual abilities. A test of his management skills was to turn them into an integrated team.

Among his collaborators were:

- Architects: Francesc Berenguer, Josep Maria Jujol, Cristòfor Cascante i Colom, Josep Francesc Ràfols, Cèsar Martinell, Joan Bergós, Francesc Folguera, Josep Canaleta, Joan Rubió, Domènec Sugrañes, Francesc Quintana, Isidre Puig i Boada, Lluís Bonet i Garí.
- Sculptors: Carles Mani, Joan Flotats, Llorenç Matamala, Joan Matamala, Josep Llimona.
- Painters: Ricard Opisso, Aleix Clapés, Iu Pascual, Xavier Nogués, Jaume Llongueras, Joaquín Torres García.
- Builders and foremen: Agustí Massip, Josep Bayó i Font, Claudi Alsina i Bonafont, Josep Pardo i Casanova and his nephew Julià Bardier i Pardo.
- Craftsmen: Eudald Puntí (carpenter and forger), Joan Oñós (forger), Lluís y Josep Badia i Miarnau (forger), Joan Bertran (plasterer), Joan Munné (cabinet maker), Frederic Labòria (cabinet maker), Antoni Rigalt i Blanch (glazier), Josep Pelegrí (glazier), Mario Maragliano (mosaic artist), Jaume Pujol i Bausis and his son Pau Pujol i Vilà (ceramicists).

== Death and legacy ==
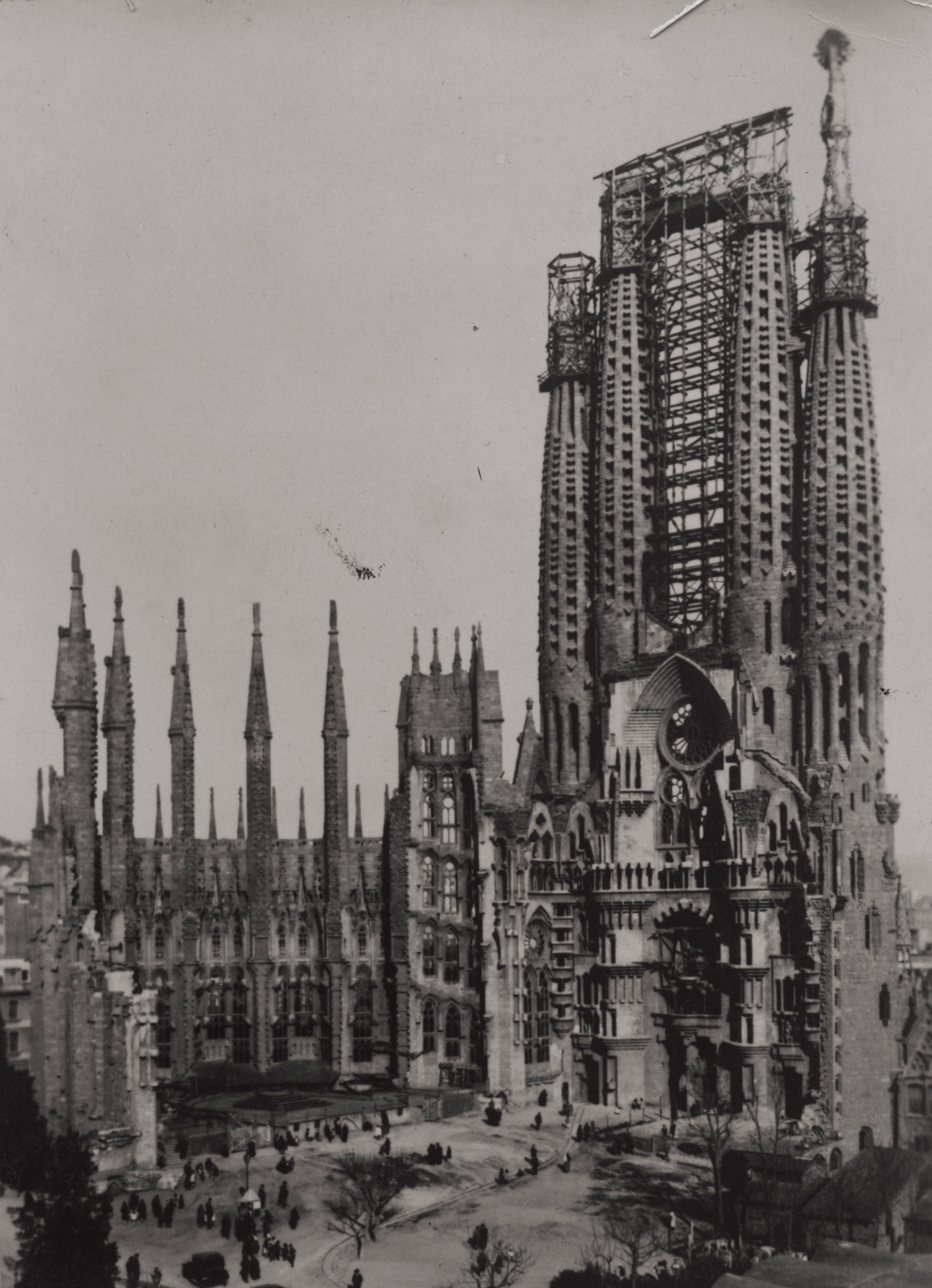
Progress of the Sagrada Família in 1926, the year of Gaudí's death

While on his way to confession on 7 June 1926, Gaudí was hit by a tram on the Gran Via de les Corts Catalanes in Barcelona. Because he had stopped worrying about his appearance and health, he was poorly dressed and appeared quite gaunt, supposedly leading people to think he was homeless and ignore him. He had no identification on him and was unconscious. A civil guard ordered a taxi to take him to the Hospital de Sant Pau, where he was diagnosed with several broken ribs, bruises on the right leg and severe internal bleeding. After the Chaplain of the Sagrada Família identified him, several people visited him. He died of his wounds on 10 June.

He is buried in Sagrada Família. After his death, Gaudí's works suffered a period of neglect and were largely unpopular among international critics, who regarded them as baroque and excessively imaginative. In his homeland he was equally disdained by Noucentisme, the new movement which replaced Modernisme. In 1936, during the Spanish Civil War, Gaudí's workshop in the Sagrada Família was ransacked, and a great number of his documents, plans and scale models were destroyed.

Gaudí's reputation was beginning to recover by the 1950s, when his work was championed by Salvador Dalí and architect Josep Lluís Sert. In 1952, the centenary year of the architect's birth, the Asociación de Amigos de Gaudí (Friends of Gaudí Association) was founded with the aim of disseminating and conserving his legacy. Four years later, a retrospective was organised at the Saló del Tinell in Barcelona, and the Gaudí Chair at the Polytechnic University of Catalonia was created with the purpose of deepening the study and conservation of his works. These events were followed in 1957 by Gaudí's first international exhibition, held at the Museum of Modern Art in New York City. In 1976, on the 50th anniversary of his death, the Spanish Ministry of Foreign Affairs organised an exhibition about Gaudí and his works that toured the globe.

Between 1950 and 1960, research and writings by international critics like George R. Collins, Nikolaus Pevsner and Roberto Pane spread a renewed awareness of Gaudí's work, while in his homeland it was admired and promoted by Alexandre Cirici, Juan Eduardo Cirlot, and Oriol Bohigas. Gaudí's work later gained widespread international appreciation, such as in Japan where notable studies were published by Hiroya Tanaka, Kenji Imai and Tokutoshi Torii. International recognition of Gaudí's contributions to the field of architecture and design culminated in the 1984 listing of Gaudí's key works as UNESCO World Heritage Sites. Gaudí's style subsequently influenced contemporary architects such as Santiago Calatrava. and Norman Foster.

Gaudí was the subject of the 1984 documentary Antonio Gaudi.

Due to Gaudí's profoundly religious and ascetic lifestyle, the archbishop of Barcelona, Ricard Maria Carles proposed Gaudí's beatification in 1998. In 1999, American composer Christopher Rouse wrote the guitar concerto Concert de Gaudí, which was inspired by Gaudí's work; it went on to win the 2002 Grammy Award for Best Classical Contemporary Composition. On the occasion of the 150th anniversary of Gaudí's birth, official ceremonies, concerts, shows and conferences were held, and several books were published. On 24 September of the same year, the musical Gaudí had its premiere in the Palau dels Esports de Barcelona. Its authors were Jordi Galceran, Esteve Miralles and Albert Guinovart. In 2008 the Gaudí Awards were launched in his honour, organised by the Catalan Film Academy to award the best Catalan films of the year. An Iberia Airbus A340-642, EC-INO is named after Gaudí.

Japanese manga artist Takehiko Inoue wrote and illustrated a travel memoir on the life and architecture of Gaudí, titled Pepita: Takehiko Inoue Meets Gaudí and published in 2013.

Each year since 2013, World Art Nouveau Day is celebrated on 10 June, the day when Gaudí died.

=== World Heritage ===
Several of Gaudí's works have been granted World Heritage status by UNESCO: in 1984 the Park Güell, the Palau Güell and the Casa Milà; and in 2005 the Nativity façade, the crypt and the apse of Sagrada Família, Casa Vicens and Casa Batlló in Barcelona, together with the crypt of the Colònia Güell in Santa Coloma de Cervelló.

According to the citation:

- The work of Antoni Gaudí represents an exceptional and outstanding creative contribution to the development of architecture and building technology in the late 19th and early 20th centuries.
- Gaudí's work exhibits an important interchange of values closely associated with the cultural and artistic currents of his time, as represented in el Modernisme [sic] of Catalonia. It anticipated and influenced many of the forms and techniques that were relevant to the development of modern construction in the 20th century.
- Gaudí's work represents a series of outstanding examples of the building typology in the architecture of the early 20th century, residential as well as public, to the development of which he made a significant and creative contribution.

=== Beatification cause ===
A sainthood guild interested in canonisation for Gaudí began work in 1992. By 2003, the cause was officially opened by the bishops of Catalonia. On 14 April 2025, Pope Francis declared Gaudí venerable after recognizing what the Vatican described as his heroic virtue. There are multiple steps in the process of being recognised as a saint, including beatification, which Gaudí has not yet achieved, although advocates are confident that the official status of "blessed" is forthcoming.

== See also ==
- Altarpiece of Alella
- Gaudí House Museum
- List of Gaudí buildings
