= Episcopal Palace, Astorga =

Coordinates: 42.4578°N 6.0560°W

Episcopal Palace of Astorga
- Palacio Episcopal de Astorga
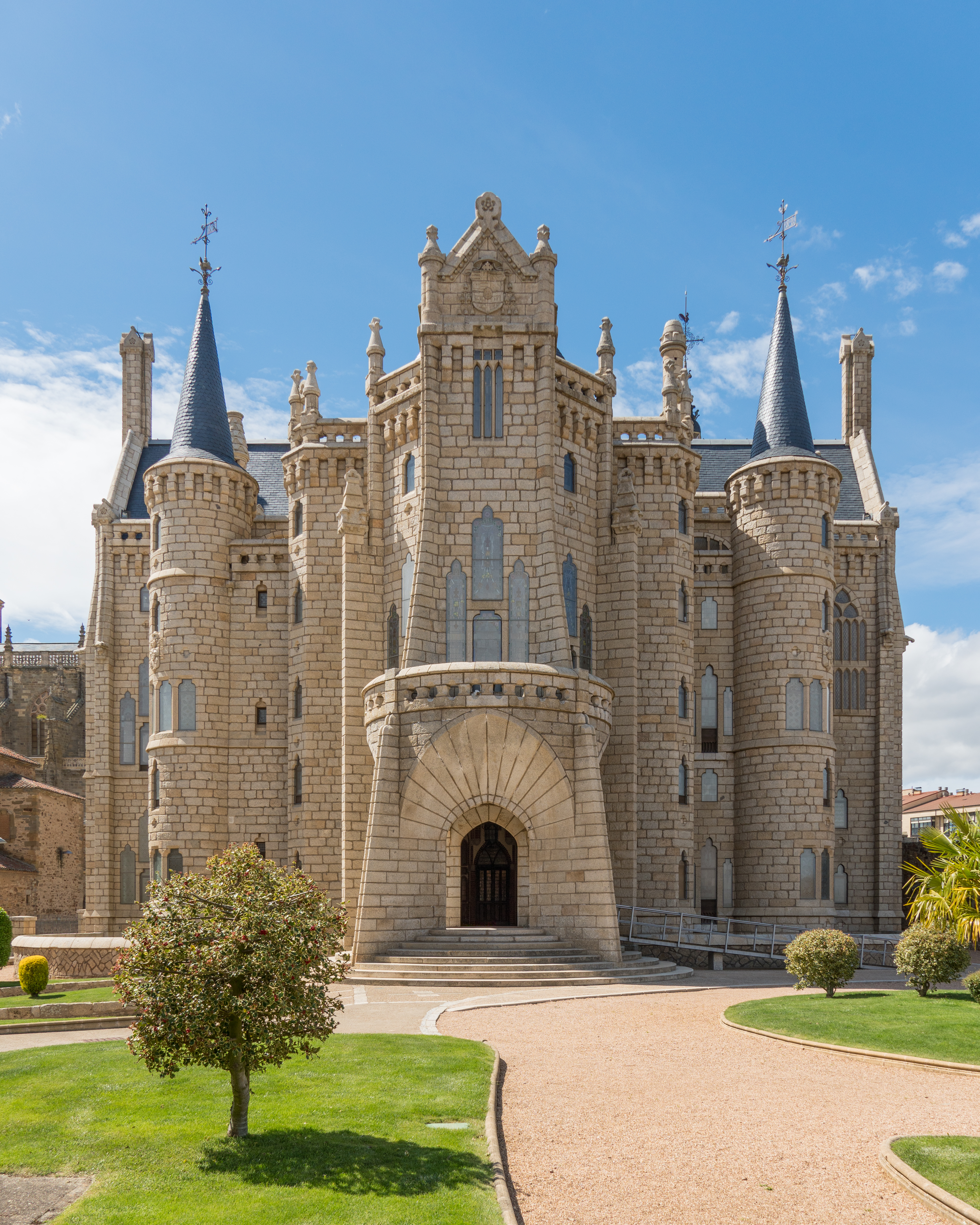

General information
- Architectural style: Modernisme
- Location: Astorga (León), Spain

Design and construction
- Architect(s): Antoni Gaudí

Spanish Cultural Heritage
- Type: Non-movable
- Criteria: Monument
- Designated: 24 July 1969
- Reference no.: RI-51-0003827

The Episcopal Palace of Astorga (Spanish: Palacio Episcopal de Astorga) is a building by Catalan architect Antoni Gaudí. It was built between 1889 and 1913. Designed in the Catalan Modernisme style, it is one of only three buildings by Gaudí outside Catalonia.

== History ==
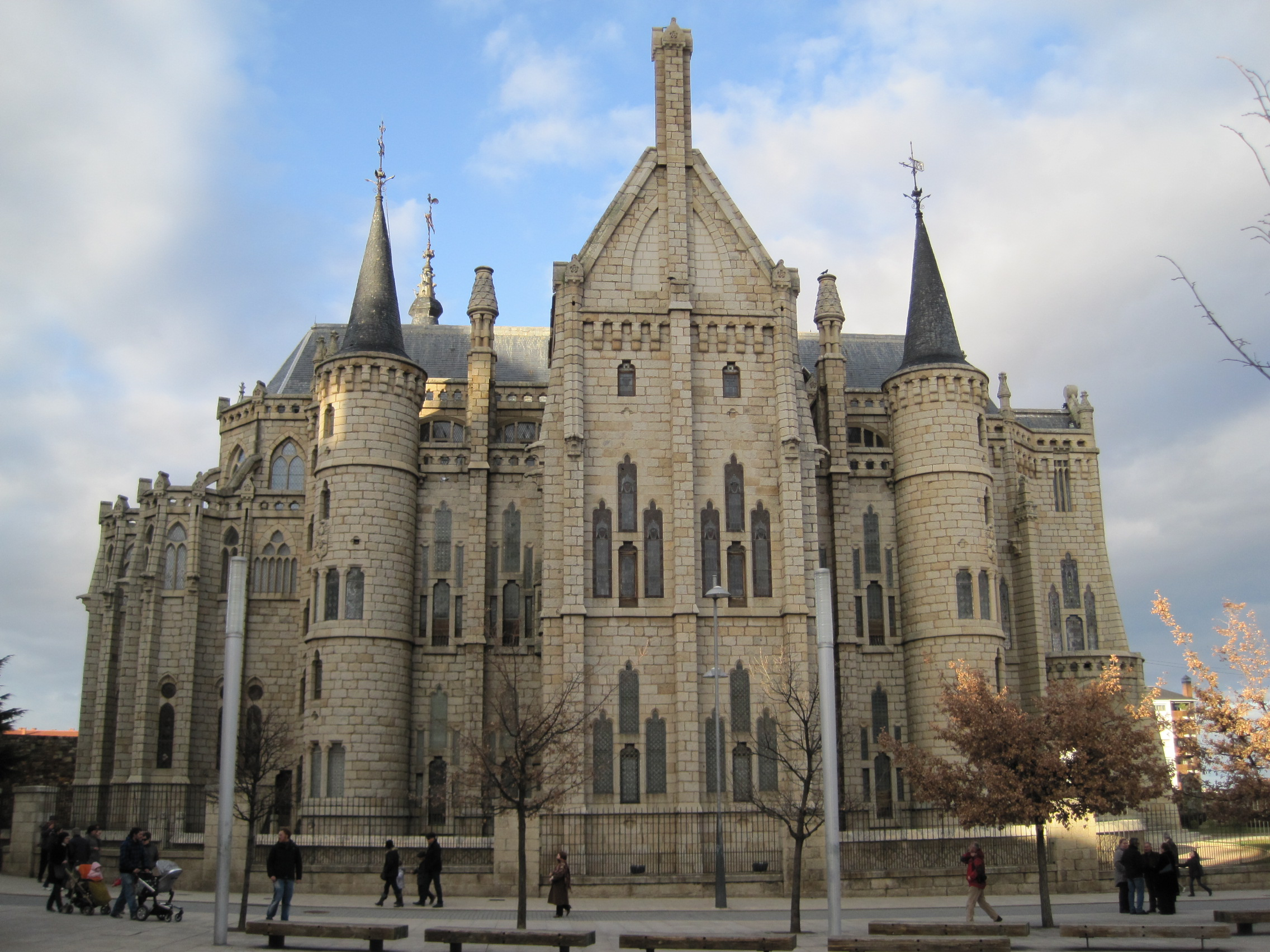
Lateral view.

When the original Episcopal Palace was destroyed by a fire in the 19th century, Bishop Juan Bautista Grau y Vallespinos of the Roman Catholic Diocese of Astorga decided to assign the design of the new building to his friend Antoni Gaudí. The two had become friends when Grau was Vicar-General in the Archdiocese of Tarragona and had inaugurated a church for which the architect had designed the high altar.

When Gaudí received the commission, he was still working at the Palau Güell in Barcelona, and thus he could not move to Astorga to study the terrain and the area of the new construction. He therefore asked the bishop to send him photographs so Gaudí could plan the new project. Gaudí sent back his design, and it was approved in February 1889. The first stone was placed in June the following year.

The edifice, built in gray granite from El Bierzo, is in a neo-medieval style harmonizing with its location, including the cathedral in particular. It does, however, also feature some of the elements typical of the later Gaudí, such as the arches of the entrance with buttresses, and the chimneys integrated in the side façades. Gaudí had devised a five-meter tall angel to crown the façade, but it was never mounted. The façade has four cylindrical towers and is surrounded by a ditch.

In 1893, after the death of Bishop Grau, Gaudí resigned over disagreements with the council, halting the construction for several years. The palace was completed between 1907 and 1915 by Ricardo Garcia Guereta. During the Spanish Civil War, the building served as the local headquarters of the Falange. In 1956 Julià Castelltort, a Catalan, began restoration works to adapt the building as a bishop's residence. Later, Bishop Marcelo González Martín promoted the conversion to the current role of the palace, a museum of religious art called Museo de los Caminos, dedicated to the Way of Santiago.

== See also ==
- List of Gaudí buildings
- Casa Botines, another project by Gaudí in León

== Sources ==
- Crippa, Maria Antonietta (2007). Gaudí. Cologne: Taschen. ISBN 978-3-8228-2519-8.
