= List of Gaudí buildings =

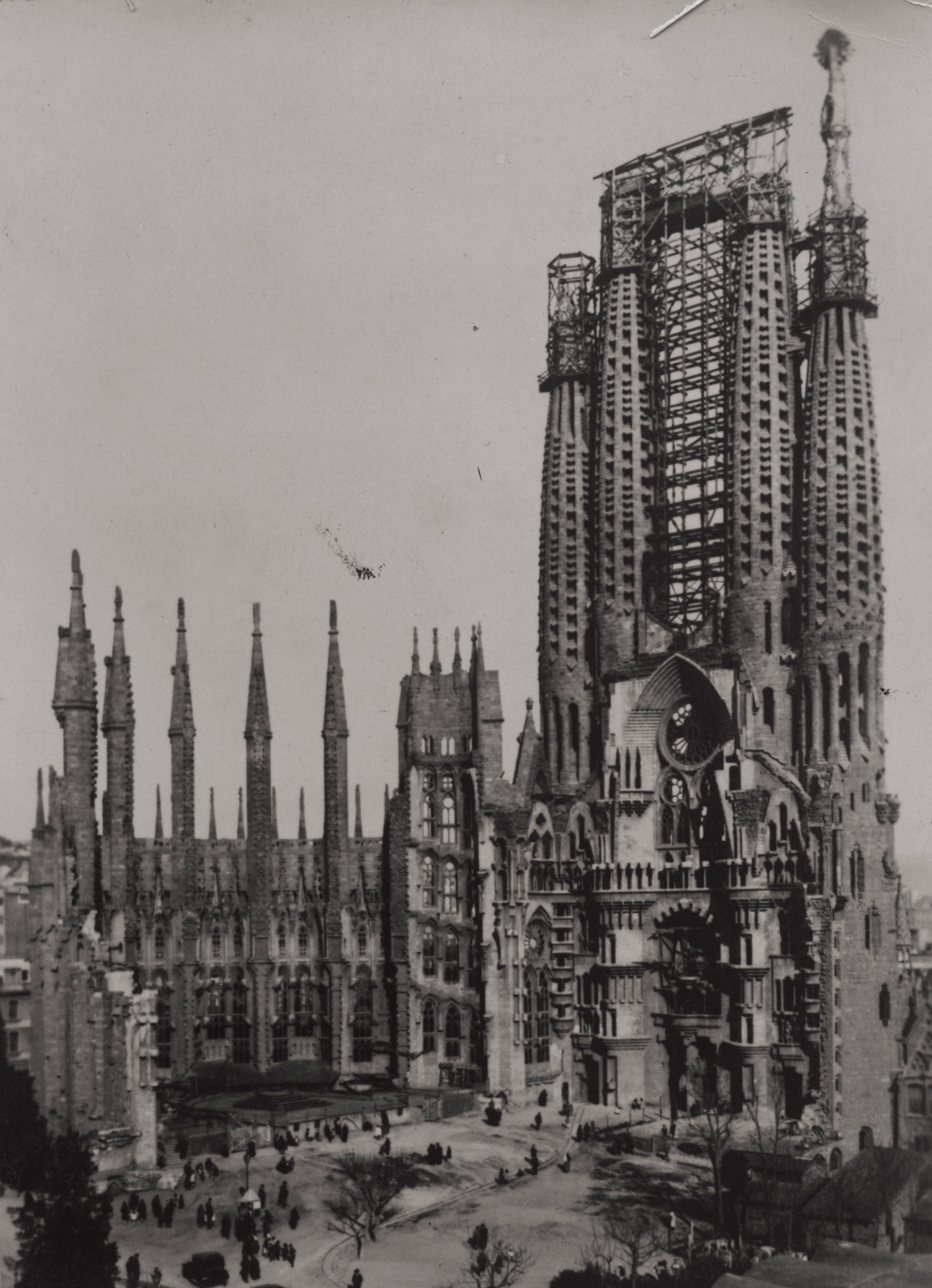
Sagrada Família progress in 1926, the year of Gaudí's death.

Antoni Gaudí was an architect from Catalonia, Spain, who belonged to the Modernisme (Art Nouveau) movement. He was famous for his unique style and highly individualistic designs.

As an architecture student at the Escola Tècnica Superior d'Arquitectura in Barcelona, from 1873 to 1877, Gaudí achieved only mediocre grades, but he did well in his "trial drawings and projects." After five years of work and schooling, Gaudí graduated as an architect in 1878.

As Elies Rogent signed Gaudí's degree, he declared in catalan: "Qui sap si hem donat el diploma a un boig o a un geni; El temps ens ho dirà" ("Who knows if we have given this diploma to a crazy guy or to a genius; Time will tell").

Gaudí immediately began to plan and design. He remained affiliated with the school his entire life.

== Built in Gaudí's lifetime ==
Dates refer to the period Gaudí was involved in the construction phase of the building.

Building	Photo	WHS	Location	Constr. start	Constr. end	Coordinates
Sagrada Família (crypt, apse and Nativity façade)		#5	Barcelona	1883	n/a	41°24′13″N 2°10′28″E
El Capricho			Comillas (Cantabria)	1883	1885	43°23′01″N 4°17′34″W
Casa Vicens		#4	Barcelona	1883	1888	41°24′12.50″N 2°9′2.44″E
Episcopal Palace of Astorga			Astorga (León)	1883	1893	42°27′28″N 6°03′21″W
Güell Pavilions			Barcelona	1884	1887	41°23′22.1382″N 2°07′9.9006″E
Palau Güell		#2	Barcelona	1885	1890	41°22′44″N 2°10′27″E
College of Saint Teresa-Ganduxer			Barcelona	1888	1889	41°23′59.76″N 2°7′58.27″E
Casa Botines			León	1891	1892	42°35′54″N 5°34′14″W
Bodegas Güell			Sitges (Barcelona)	1895	1897	41°15′21.09″N 1°54′19.55″E
Casa Calvet			Barcelona	1898	1900	41°23′27″N 2°10′23″E
Bellesguard			Barcelona	1900	1909	41°24′34″N 2°07′37″E
Park Güell		#1	Barcelona	1900	1914	41°24′49″N 2°09′10″E
Artigas Gardens			La Pobla de Lillet (Barcelona)	1905	1906	42°15′13″N 1°58′30″E
Casa Batlló		#6	Barcelona	1904	1906	41°23′30″N 2°09′54″E
Casa Milà		#3	Barcelona	1906	1912	41°23′43″N 2°09′42″E
Church of Colònia Güell		#7	Santa Coloma de Cervelló (Barcelona)	1908	1914	41°21′49″N 2°1′41″E
Sagrada Família Schools		#5^{*}	Barcelona	1909		41°24′10.7″N 2°10′27.0″E

== Building designs ==
Designs of buildings that were not, or at least not fully, realised during the architect's life. Dates refer to the period Gaudí was involved with the design.

Name	photo	Location	Date	Coordinates
Sagrada Família		Barcelona	1883–n/a	41°24′13″N 2°10′28″E
Franciscan Missions in Tangier		Tangier, Morocco	1892	
Hotel Attraction		New York City, United States	1908	

== UNESCO World Heritage Site ==
Works of Antoni Gaudí
UNESCO World Heritage Site
- Includes: 1. Parque Güell; 2. Palacio Güell; 3. Casa Mila; 4. Casa Vicens; 5. Nativity Façade and Crypt of the Sagrada Familia; 6. Casa Batlló; 7. Crypt at the Colònia Güell
- Criteria: Cultural: (i)(ii)(iv)
- Reference: 320bis
- Inscription: 1984 (8th Session)
- Extensions: 2005

Seven buildings are included in UNESCO's World Heritage Site No. 320bis, Works of Antoni Gaudí. All of them located in the Province of Barcelona:

1. Parque Güell
2. Palacio Güell
3. Casa Mila
4. Casa Vicens
5. Nativity Façade and Crypt of the Sagrada Familia
  ^{*}Other parts of the Sagrada Familia, including the Sagrada Família Schools, are included in the buffer zone of the 5th part of the WHS site.
6. Casa Batlló
7. Crypt at the Colònia Güell
  Buffer zone includes part of the Colònia Güell and the Torre Salvana
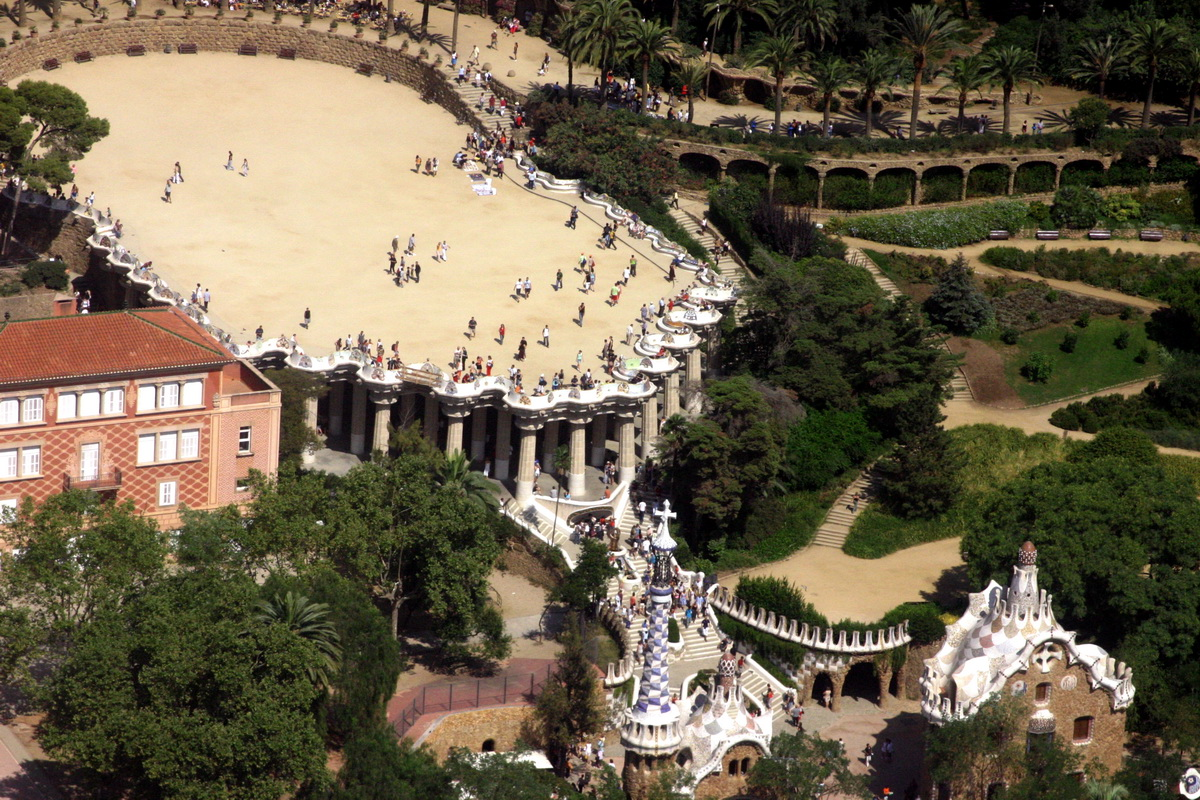
1. Park Güell

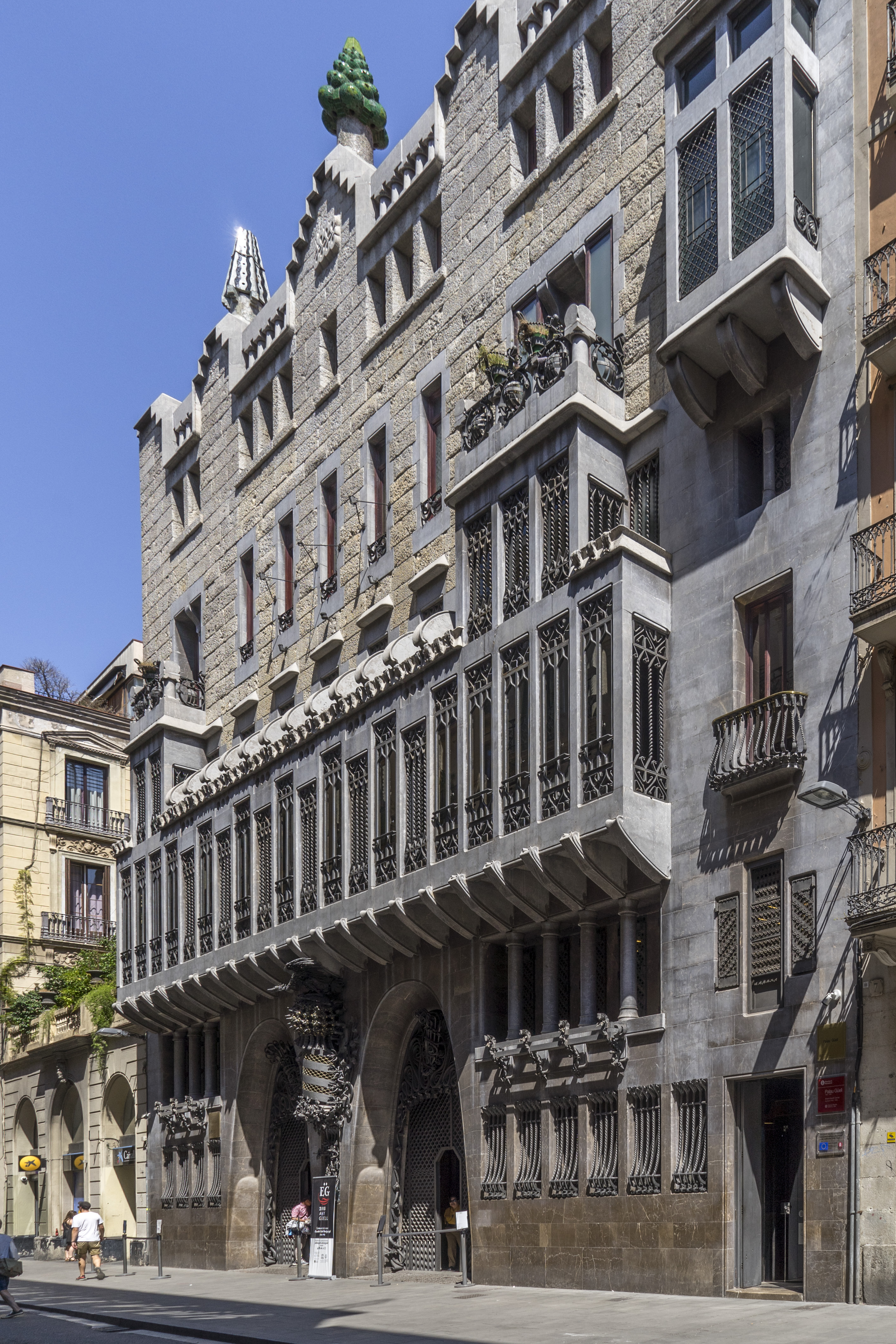
2. Palau Güell

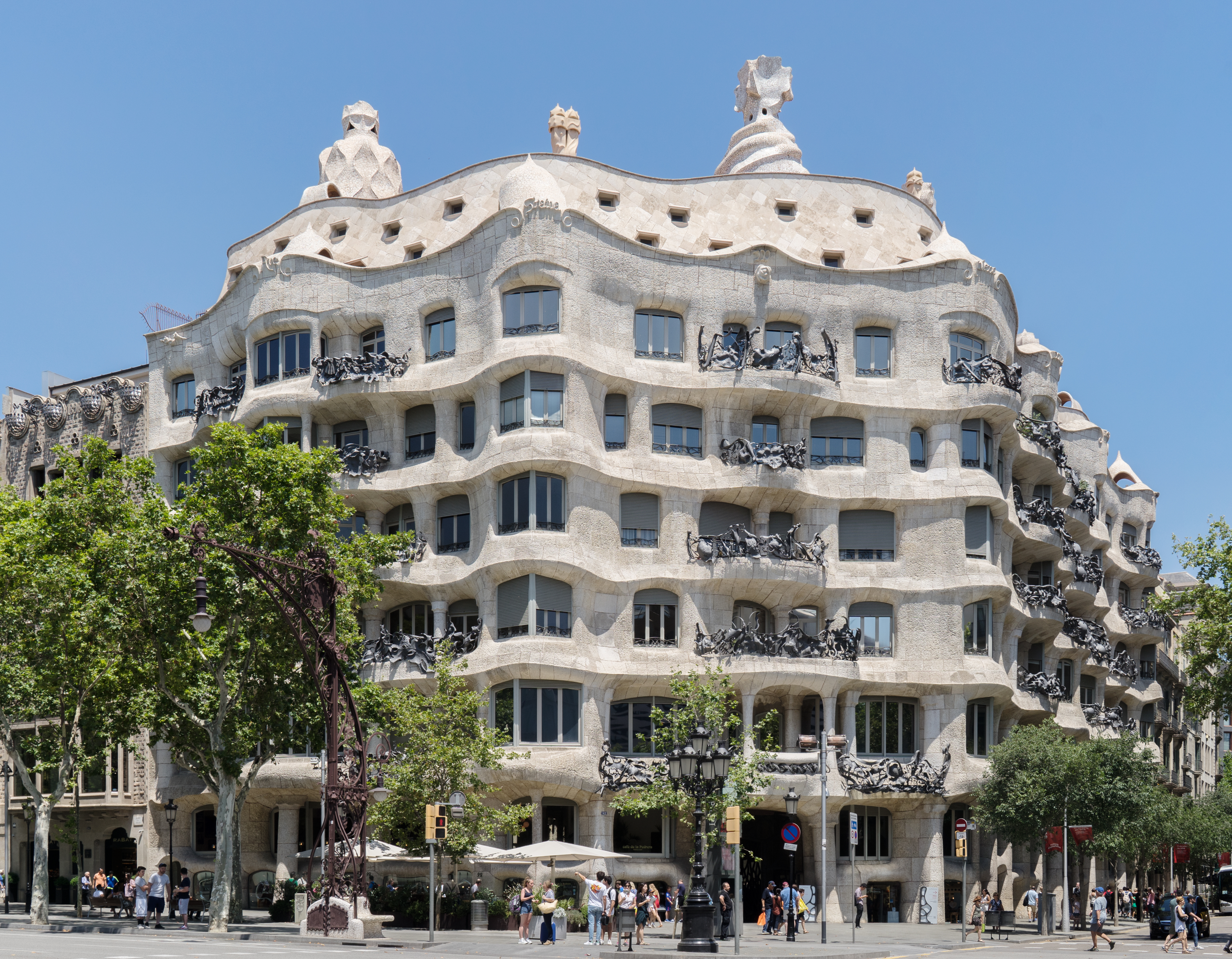
3. Casa Milà

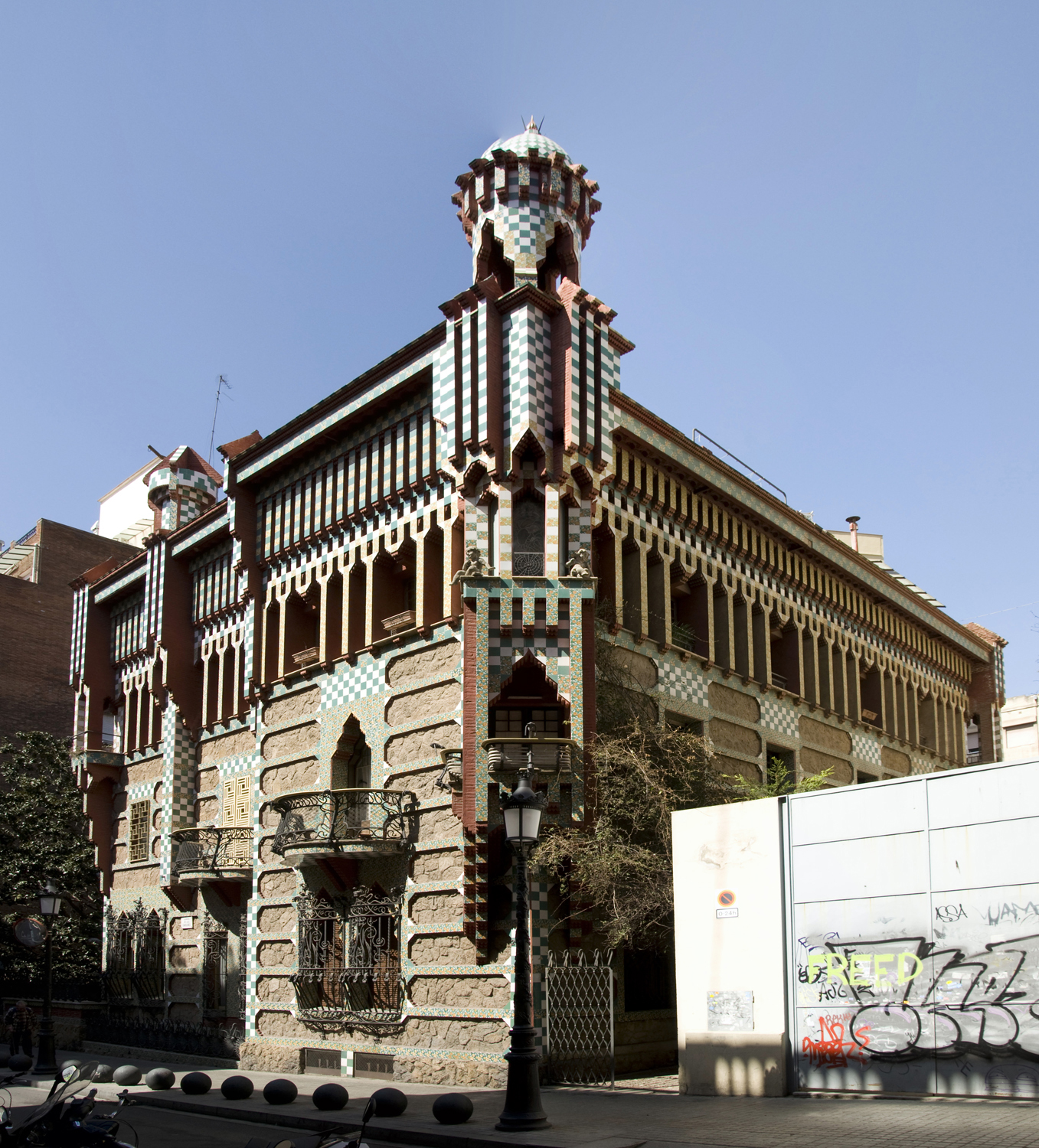
4. Casa Vicens

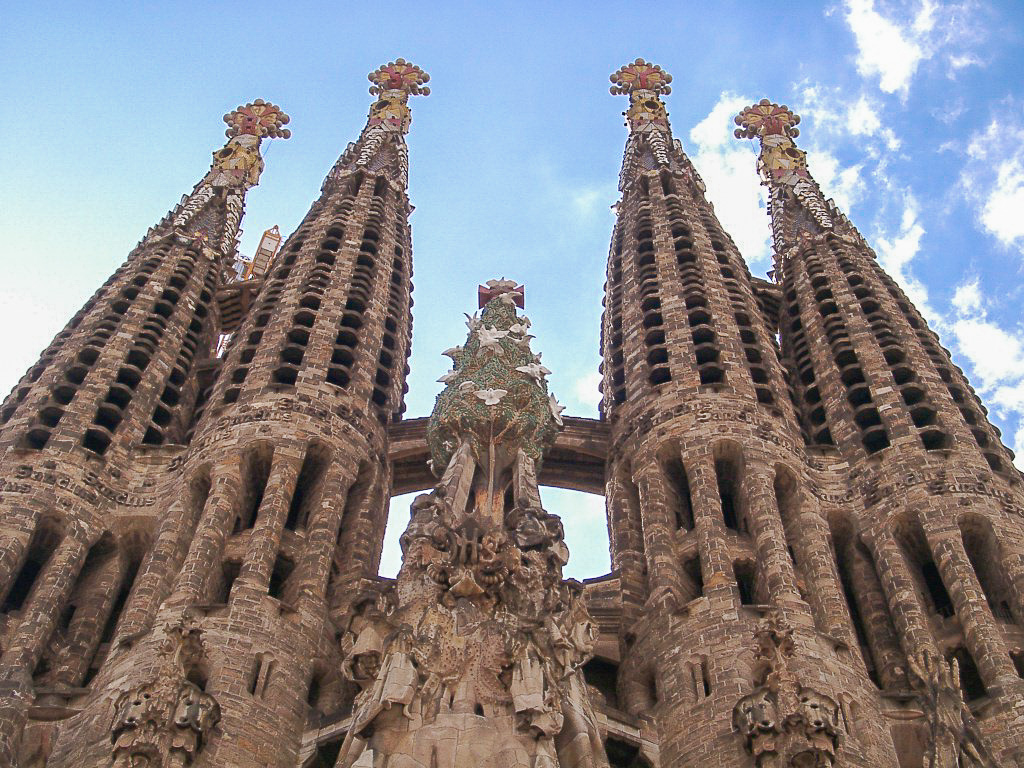
5. Sagrada Família

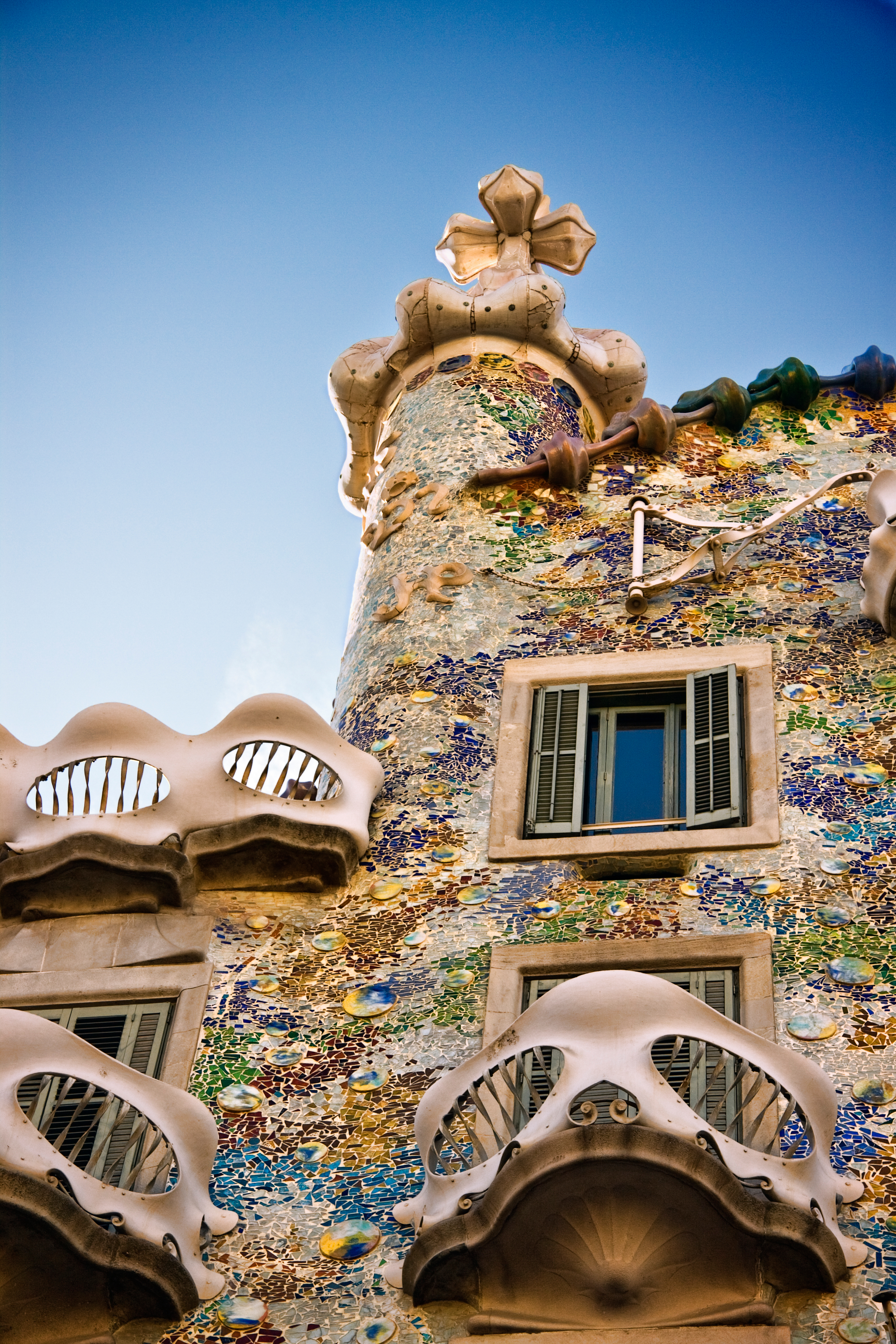
6. Casa Batlló

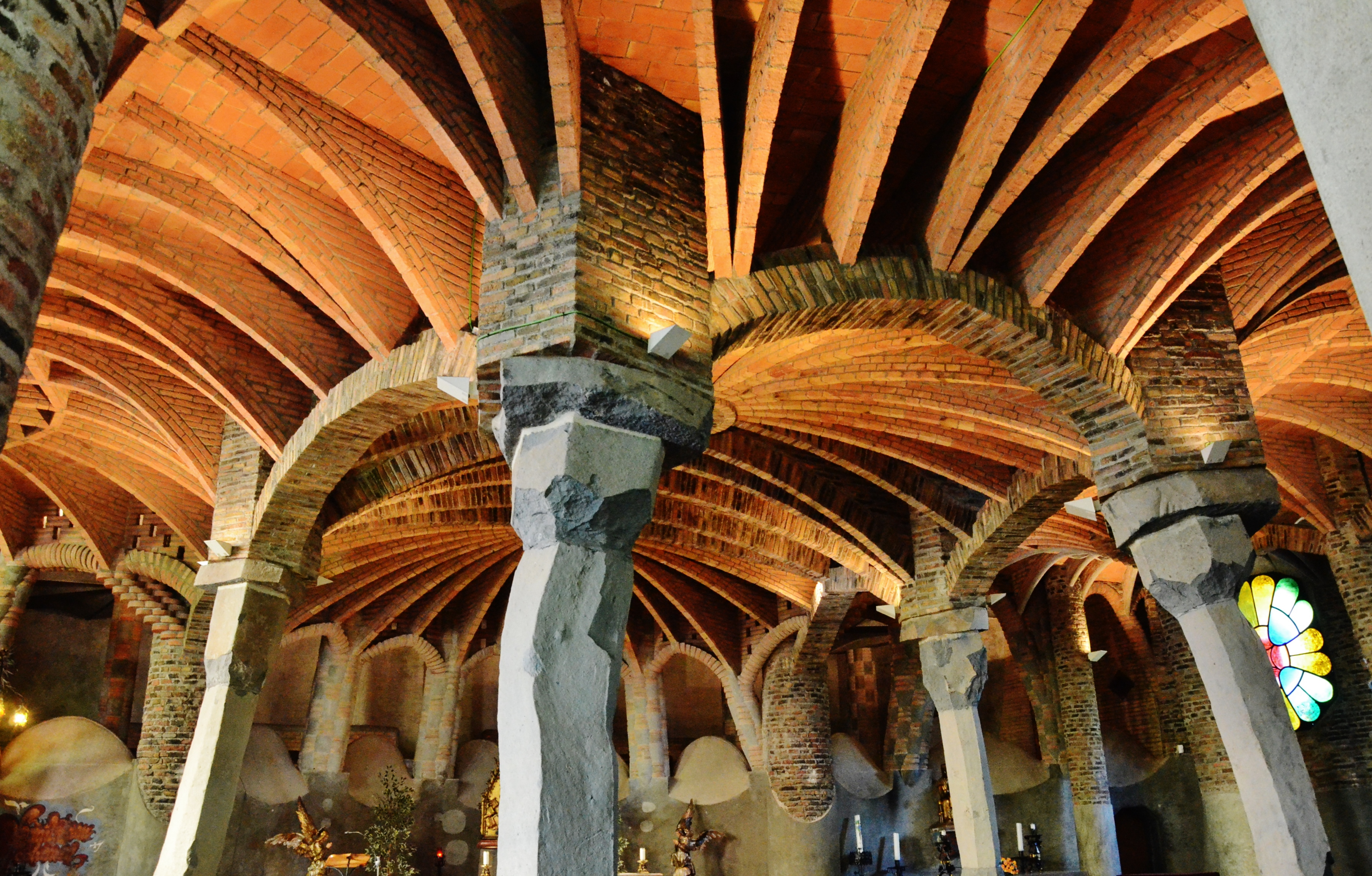
7. Cripta Güell
