= College of Saint Teresa-Ganduxer =

School in Barcelona

- Col·legi de les Teresianes / Col·legi Santa Teresa-Ganduxer
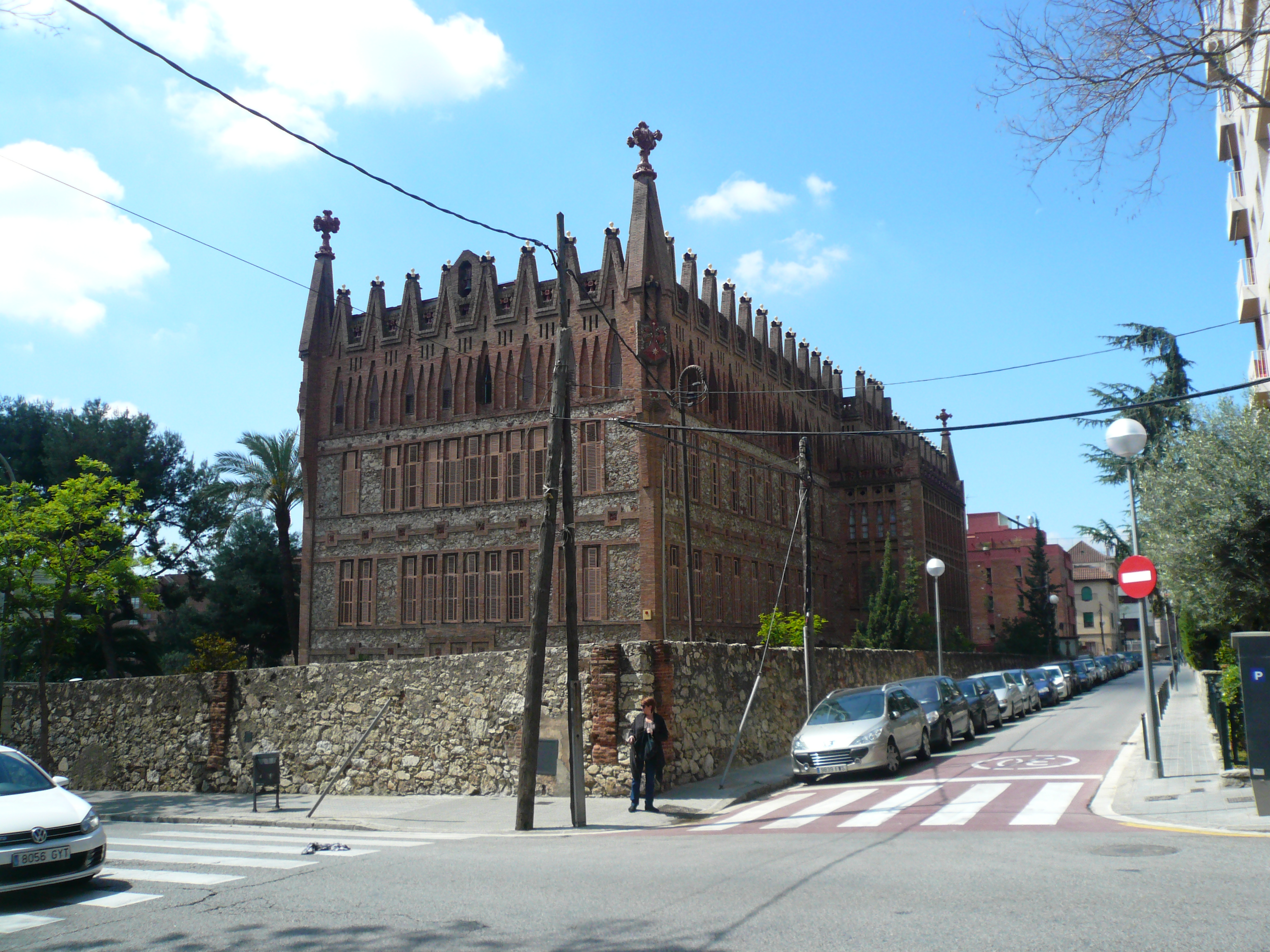
- Interactive map of the College of Saint Teresa-Ganduxer area

General information
- Type: School
- Architectural style: Modernisme
- Location: Barcelona, Spain
- Coordinates: 41°23′59″N 2°8′00″E
- Construction started: 1887
- Completed: 1889
- Client: Enric d'Ossó

Technical details
- Structural system: Brick vaulting

Design and construction
- Architects: Antoni Gaudí i Cornet, Joan Baptista Pons i Trabal

Spanish Cultural Heritage
- Type: Non-movable
- Criteria: Monument
- Designated: 24 July 1969
- Reference no.: RI-51-0003820

The College of Saint Teresa-Ganduxer (Catalan: Col·legi de les Teresianes or Col·legi Santa Teresa—Ganduxer) is a school on the Carrer de Ganduxer in the old town of Sant Gervasi de Cassoles, currently part of the Tres Torres neighborhood of the Sarrià—Sant Gervasi district of Barcelona. The school offers all the courses of the regular education curriculum from the second cycle of infantile education to the baccalaureate. It used to be a girls-only school, but by the end of the twentieth century it was a mixed school. It has an agreement with the Generalitat de Catalunya to teach the compulsory education curriculum. The building, designed by noted Catalan Modernisme architect Antoni Gaudí, has been declared a Spanish Asset of Cultural Interest.

== Description ==
The College of Saint Teresa-Ganduxer is composed of an elongated rectangular building with a longitudinal axis of communication, consisting of parabolic arches, and rises four stories high (ground floor and three stories), made primarily of stone and exposed brick. At the corners of the façade, there are brick pinnacles with a helical column culminating in the four-armed cross, typical of Gaudí's works, and with ceramic shields with various defining symbols of the Teresian order: the crowned Mount Carmel. by the cross, the heart of the Virgin crowned with thorns and that of St. Teresa pierced by an arrow.

Almost all the windows are enclosed by the parabolic arches, and on the ground floor the arches form a gallery. On the first and second floors, the arches are inscribed in a rectangle of bricks. On the top floor, a succession of arches (alternating open and blind) form a large frieze that crowns the whole, which is superimposed on the roof railing which is combined with a kind of merlet. It is triangular in shape and pinnacles with four-armed crosses at the corners.

On one of the long façades is a small porch close to the square, which rises two more floors forming gazebos, enclosed by brick latticework with small colored ceramic circles. The entrance door of this porch, formed by a parabolic arch, has a wrought iron gate, which is in line with the dragon door of the Güell pavilions, although its design is simpler. The coat of arms of the order appears in several places. Instead, there are virtually no ornamental elements, but constructive solutions.

Inside, there is a corridor that is famous for the succession of parabolic arches it contains. These arches are not merely decorative, but have the function of supporting the ceiling and the upper floor. Gaudí used the parabolic arch as an ideal construction element, capable of supporting high weights by means of thin profiles. The Teresian building thus becomes one of Gaudí's most coherent works, in which the interior and exterior form a unit.

== History ==
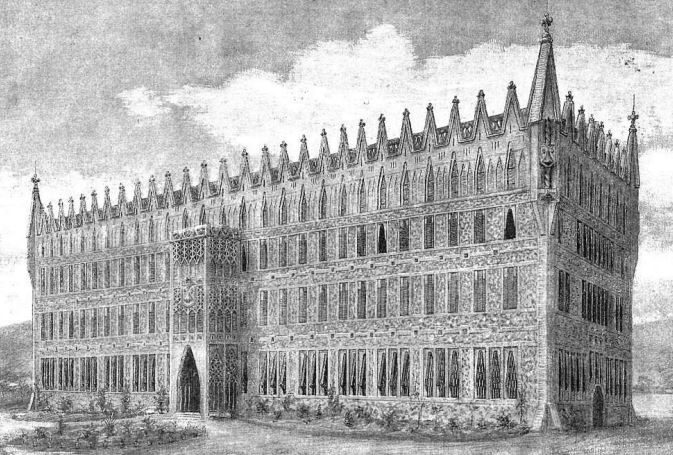
The College of Saint Teresa-Ganduxer in 1890.

Gaudí designed the building for the convent and school of the Teresians on a small budget, which together with the austerity of the religious order determined that the work was rather unpretentious; In this way, the simplicity of the internal structures is reflected on the outside, which is not decorated with any kind of polychromy. The program given to Gaudí by Saint Enrique de Ossó i Cervelló was to house a school and the convent of the Congregation of Teresian nuns (Society of St. Teresa of Jesus), which Ossó himself had founded in 1876.

The school building was conceived to replace the structure that until then the nuns had lived in at Carrer de Sant Elies, 4, of the then-independent municipality of Sant Gervasi de Cassoles. The house was occupied in 1886 and functioned as a boarding school, novitiate and provincial headquarters for rent. The inadequacy of the premises was soon seen and the current land was bought, then easily accessible to be near the railway from Sarrià to Barcelona, then an independent municipality and far from Barcelona.

Construction began in 1887 under the direction of the architect Joan Baptista Pons i Trabal, but in 1888 Ossó commissioned the project from Gaudí, who was building his own reputation as both an architect and as a devout Catholic, which attracted Ossó. Construction lasted from 1888 to 1889.

Only the building foundations of the project of Pons i Trabal had been carried out. Gaudí's austerity in the design reflected the order's vow of poverty, following the instructions of the nuns. His building used brick on the exterior and in some elements on the interior. Arguing that brick was not expensive, and that there was not much difference in the cost of placing the pieces one way or another, Gaudí created decorative elements where possible. He also incorporated wrought iron grilles, one of his favorite materials, and crowned it with a set of battlements that suggest a castle, a possible allusion to the work of Saint Teresa of Ávila, The Inner Castle.

In 1908, Gaudí designed a chapel that was never built due to disagreements with the superior of the convent; the current chapel, in a Gothic Revival style, is the work of Gabriel Borrell i Cardona.

== Image gallery ==
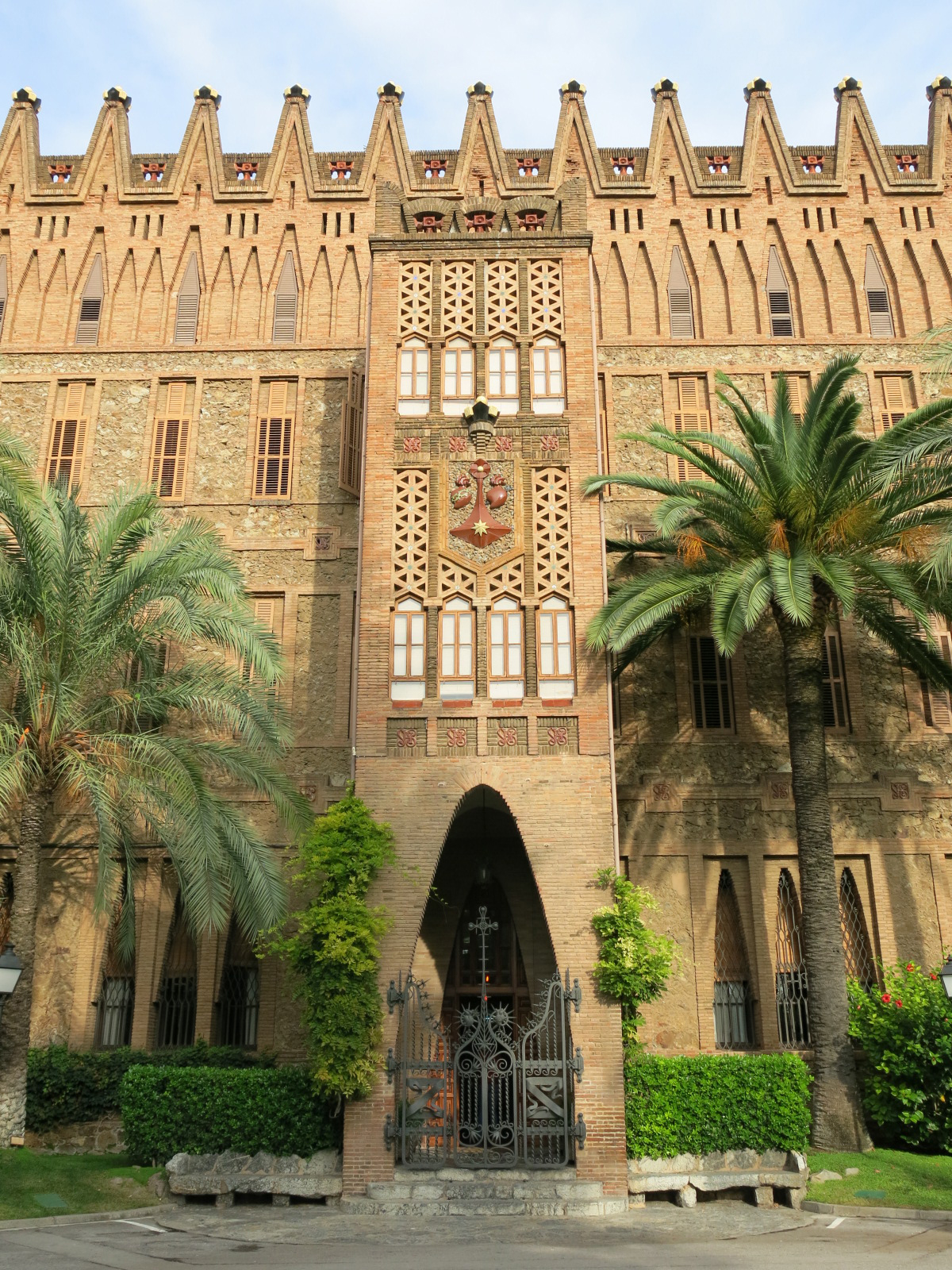
Main entrance

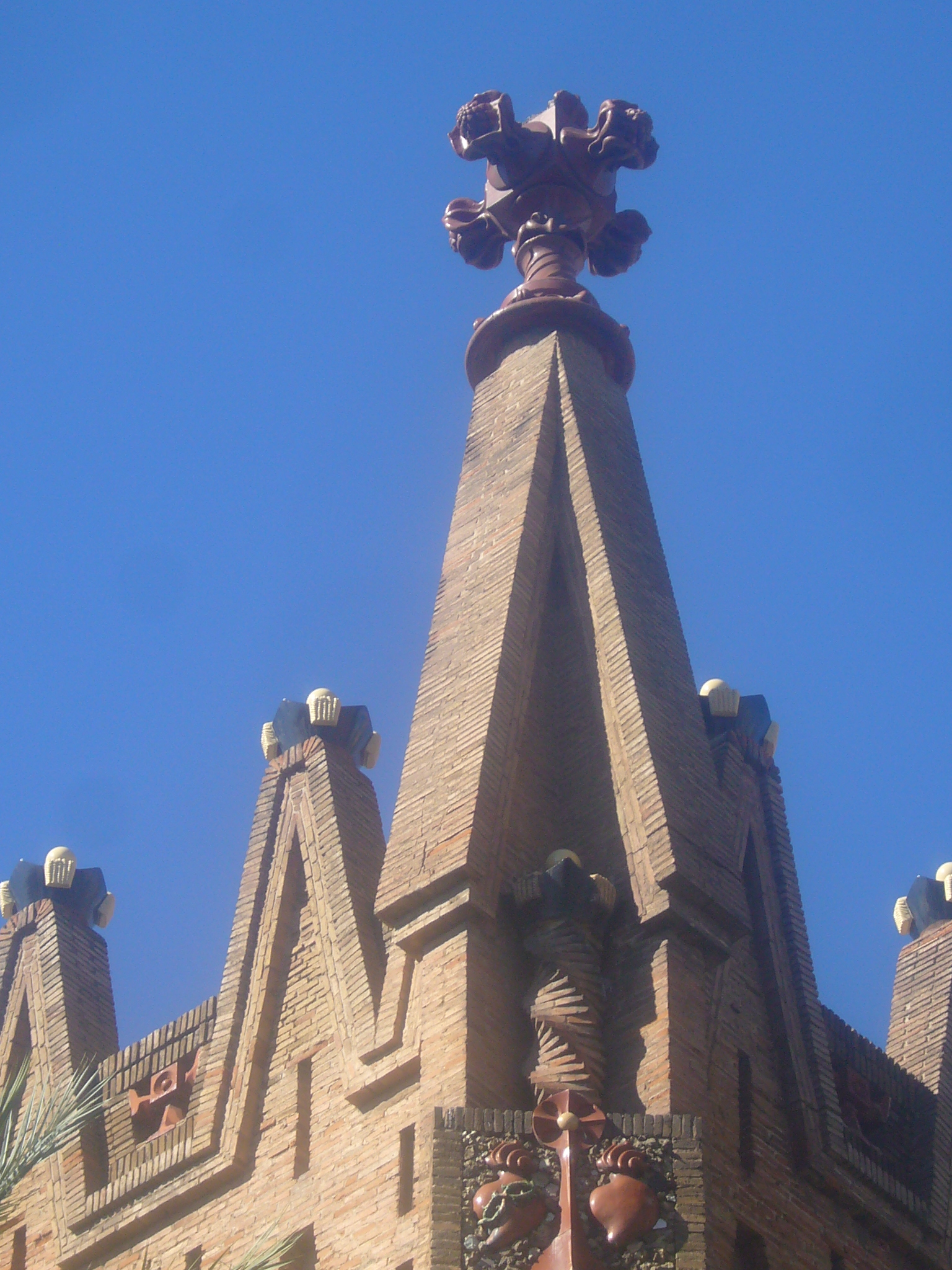
Detail of ceramic pinnacle

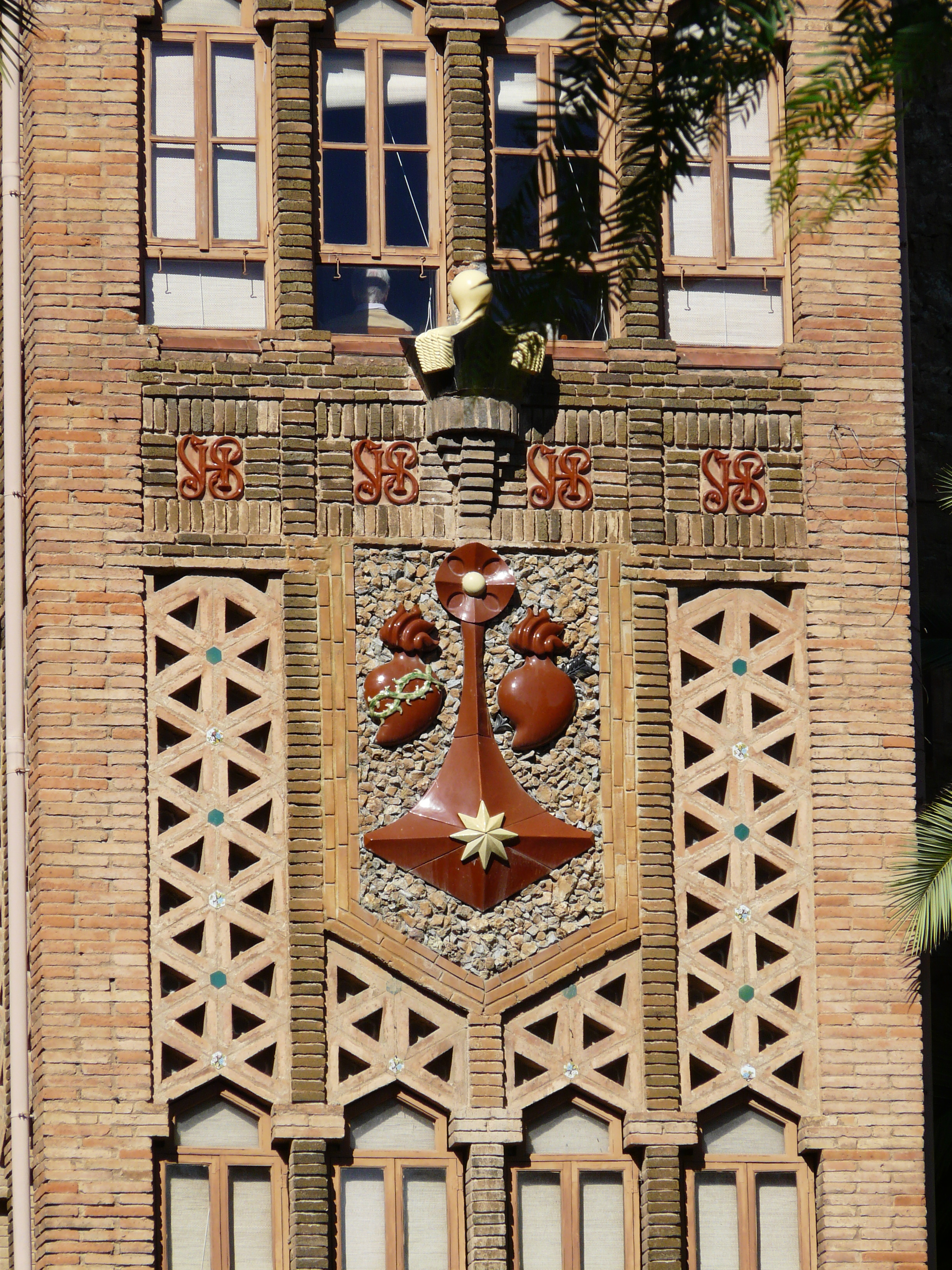
Façade detail

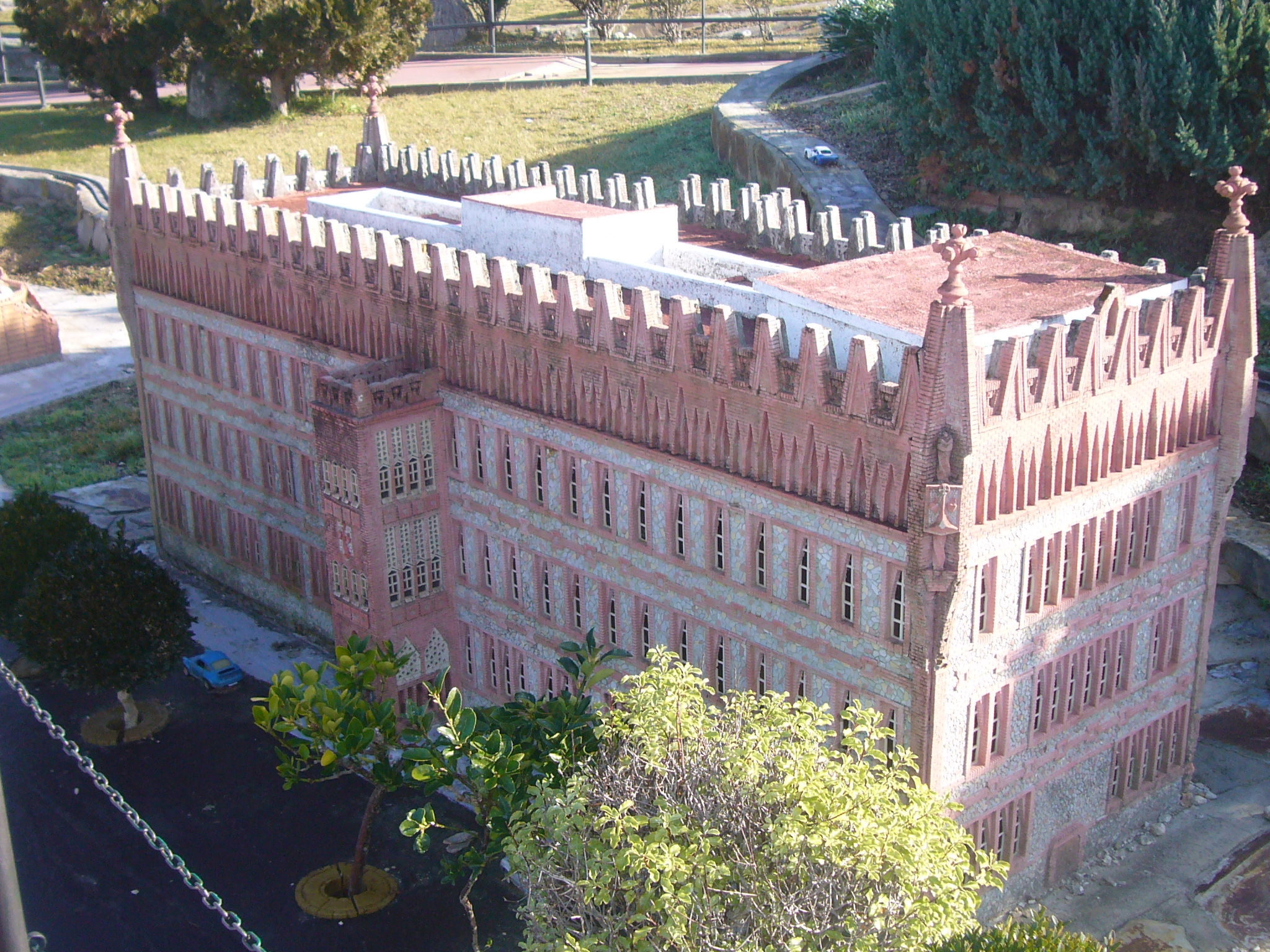
Miniature model

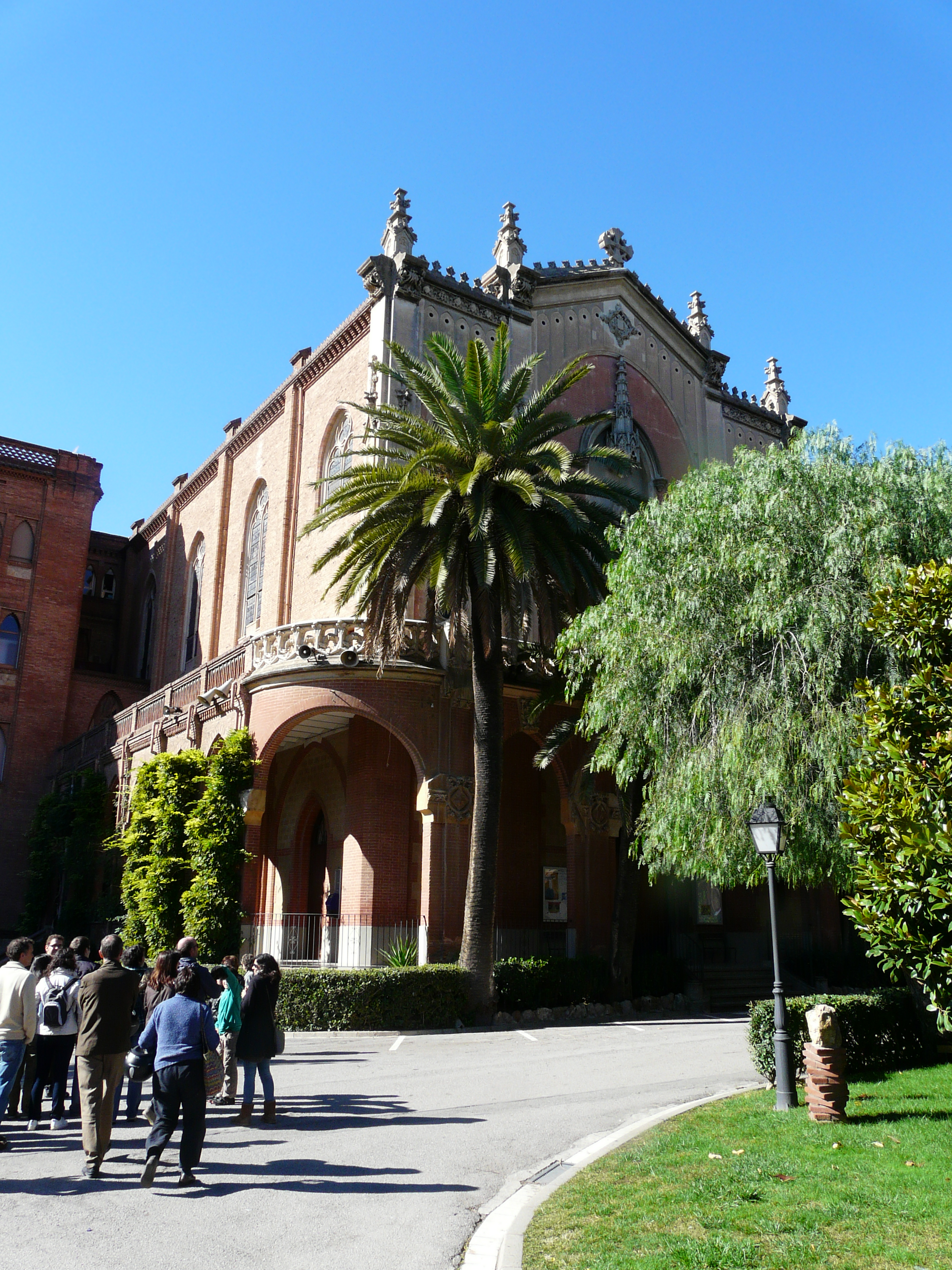
Chapel

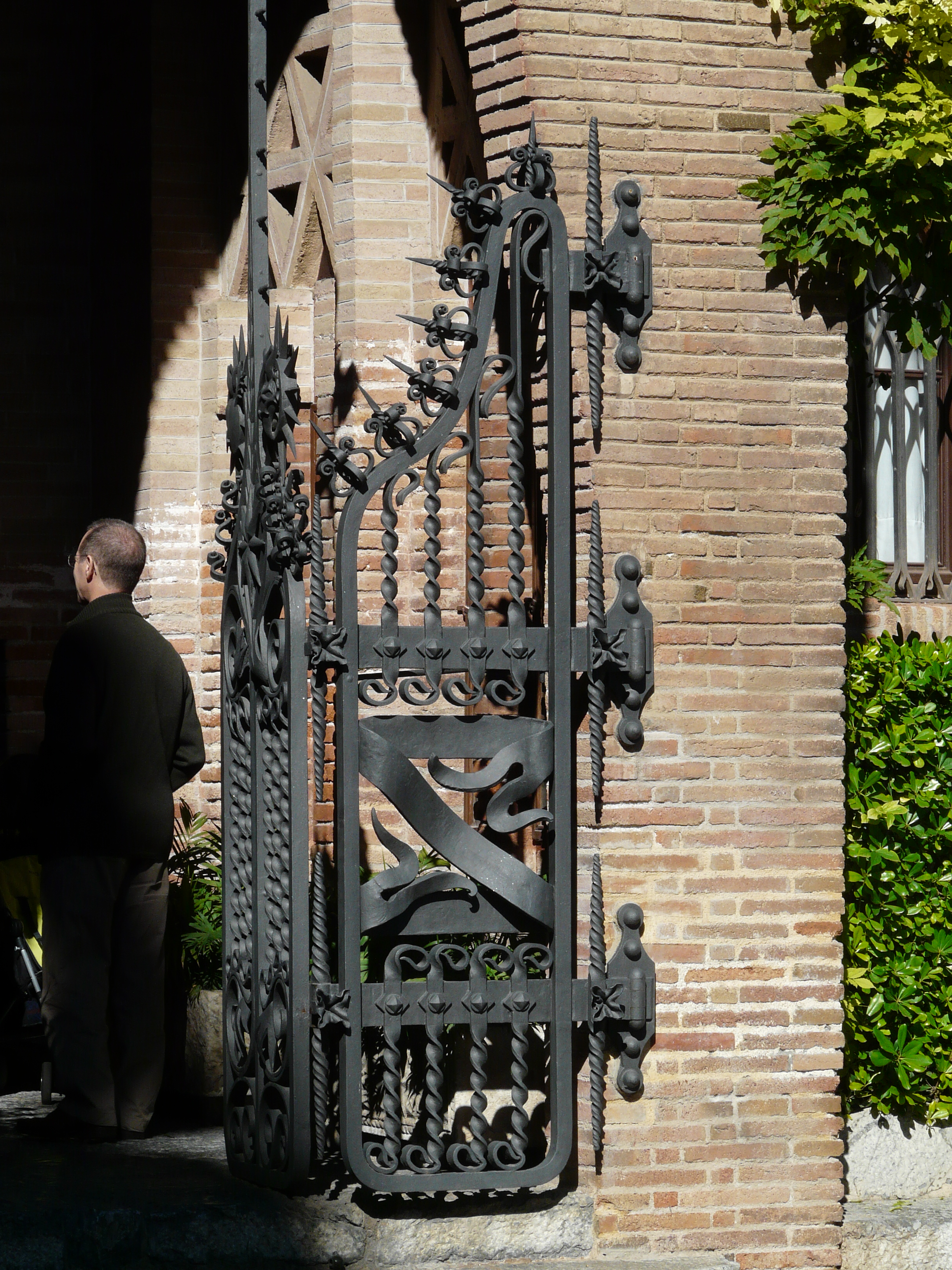
Gate

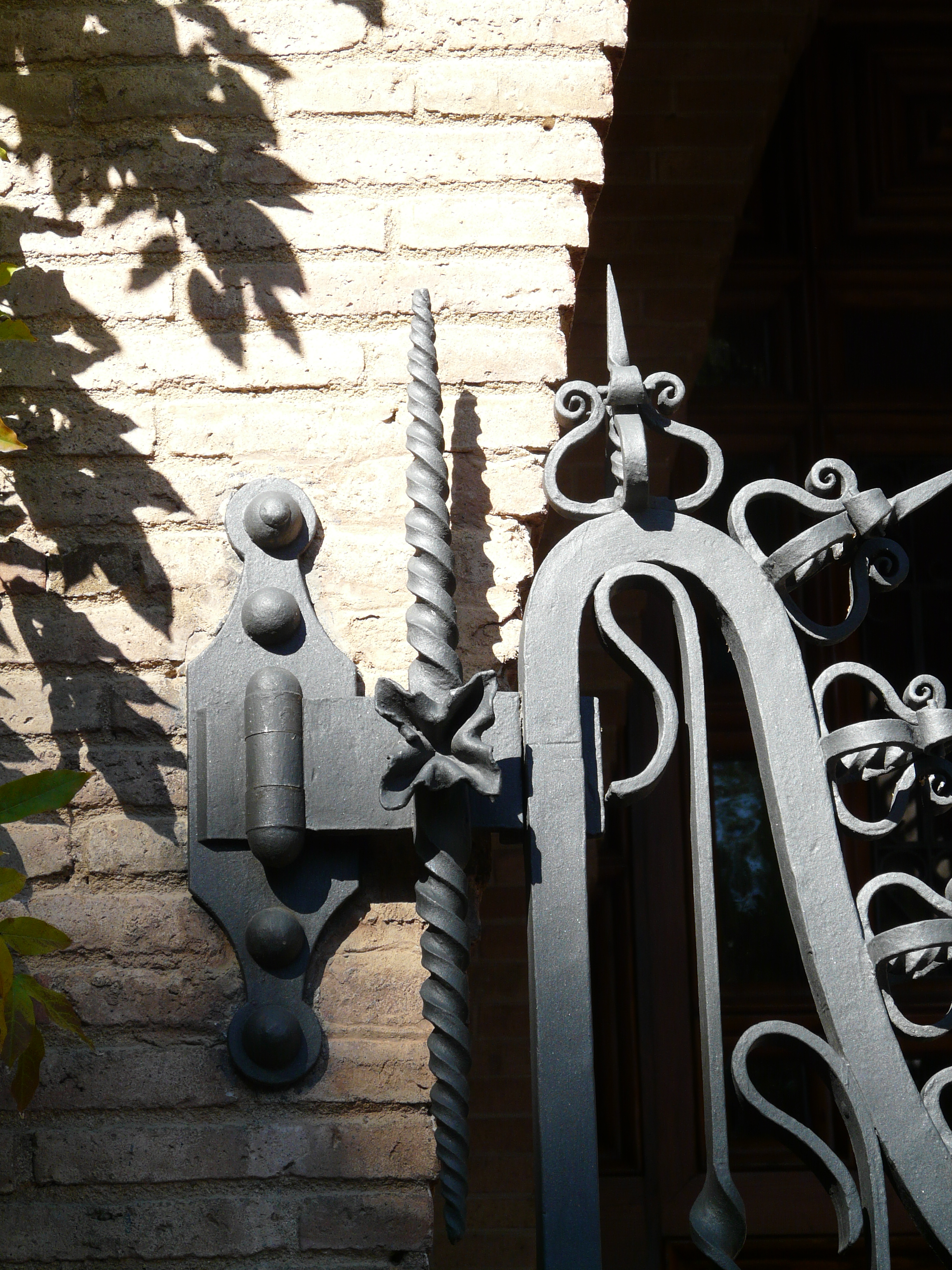
Ironwork detail

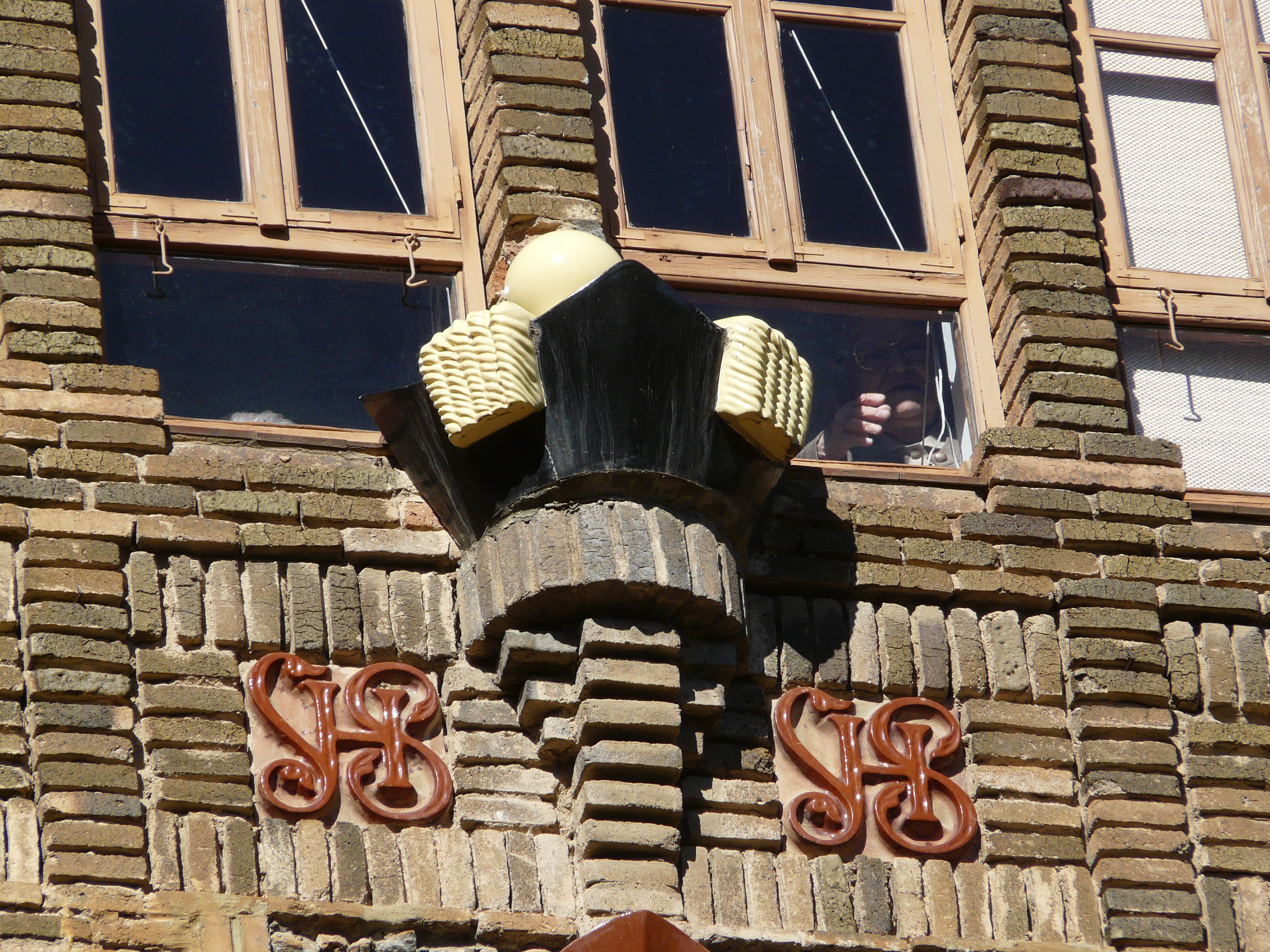
Façade detail

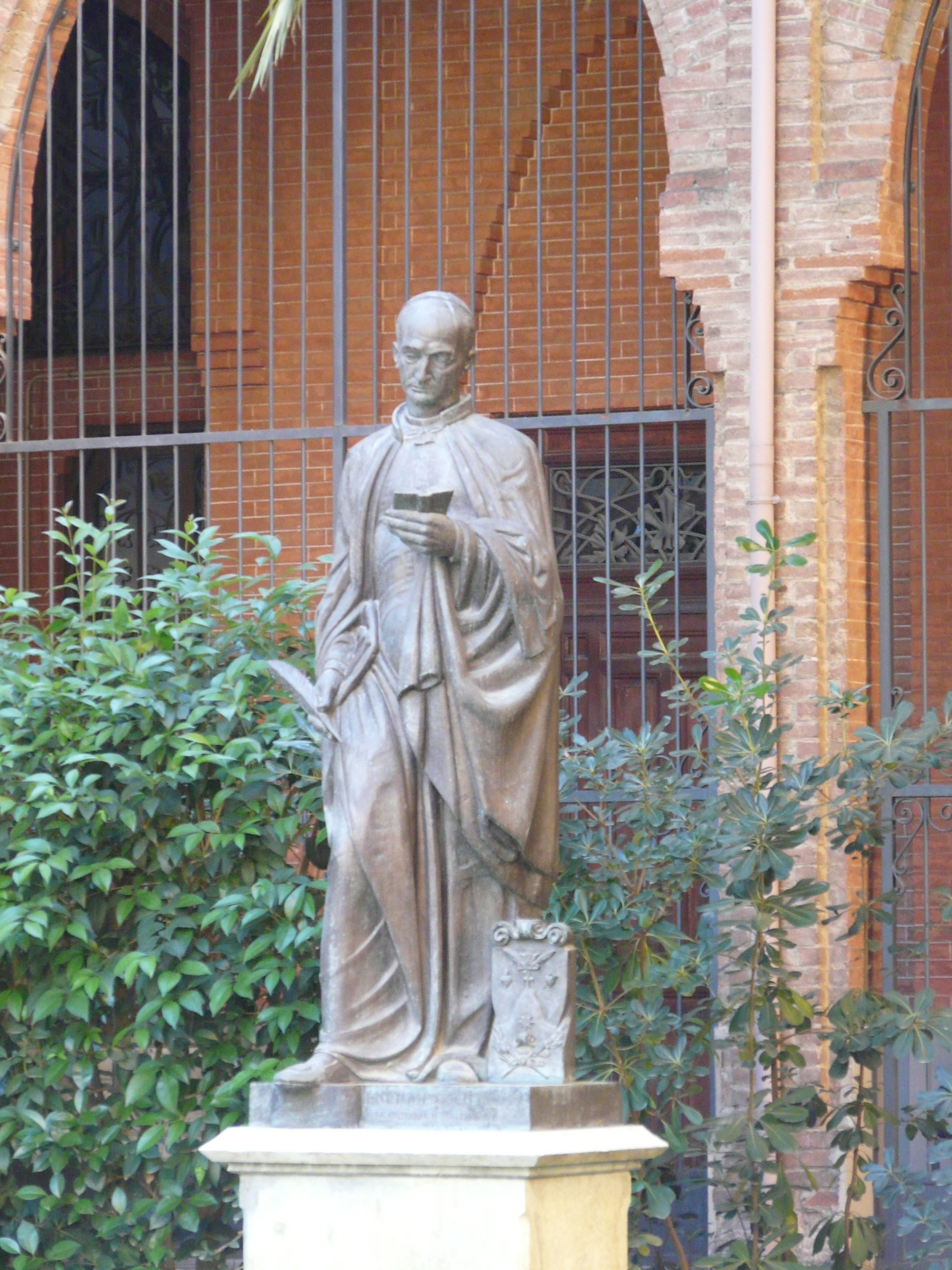
Statuary

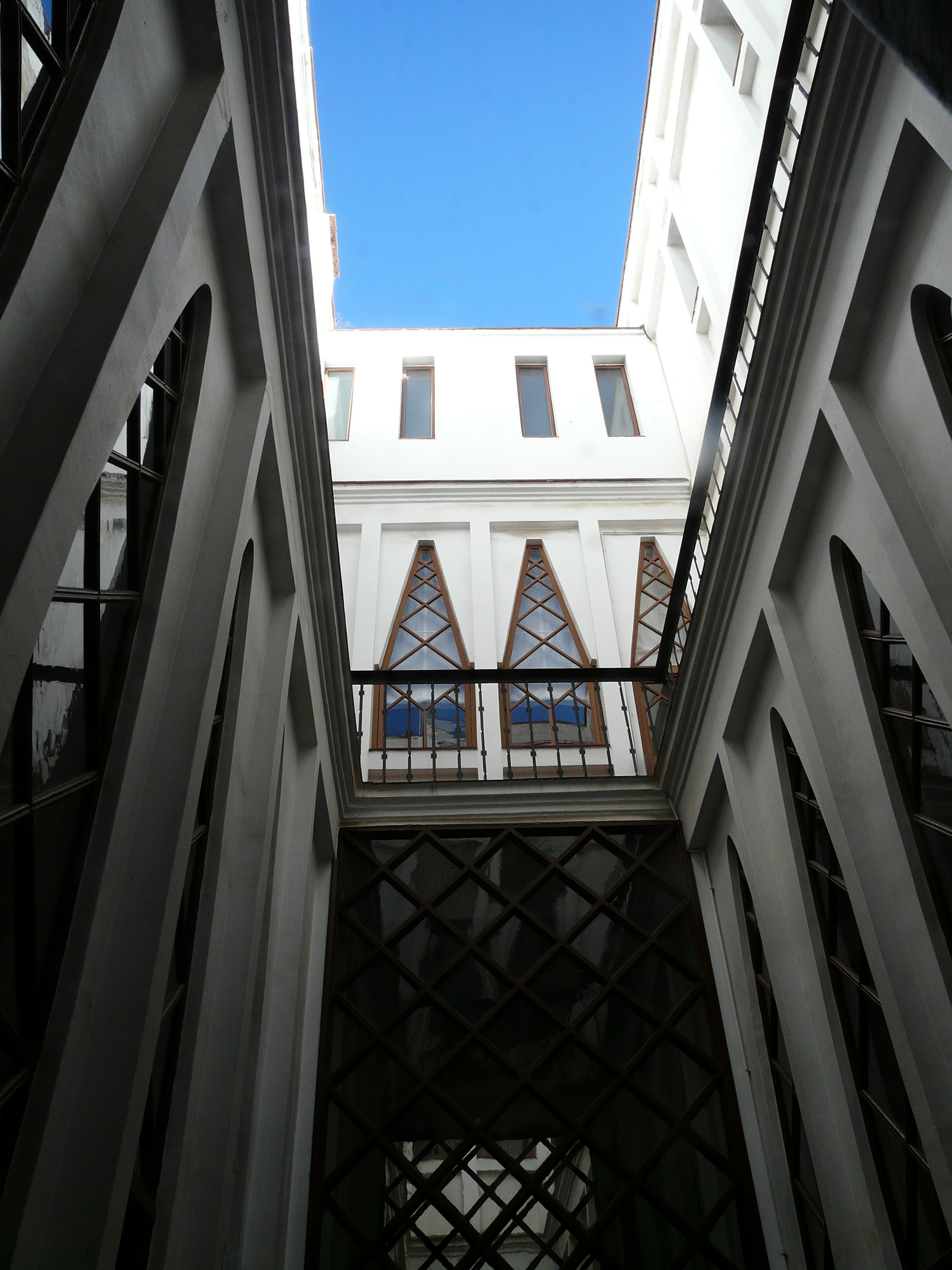
Interior court

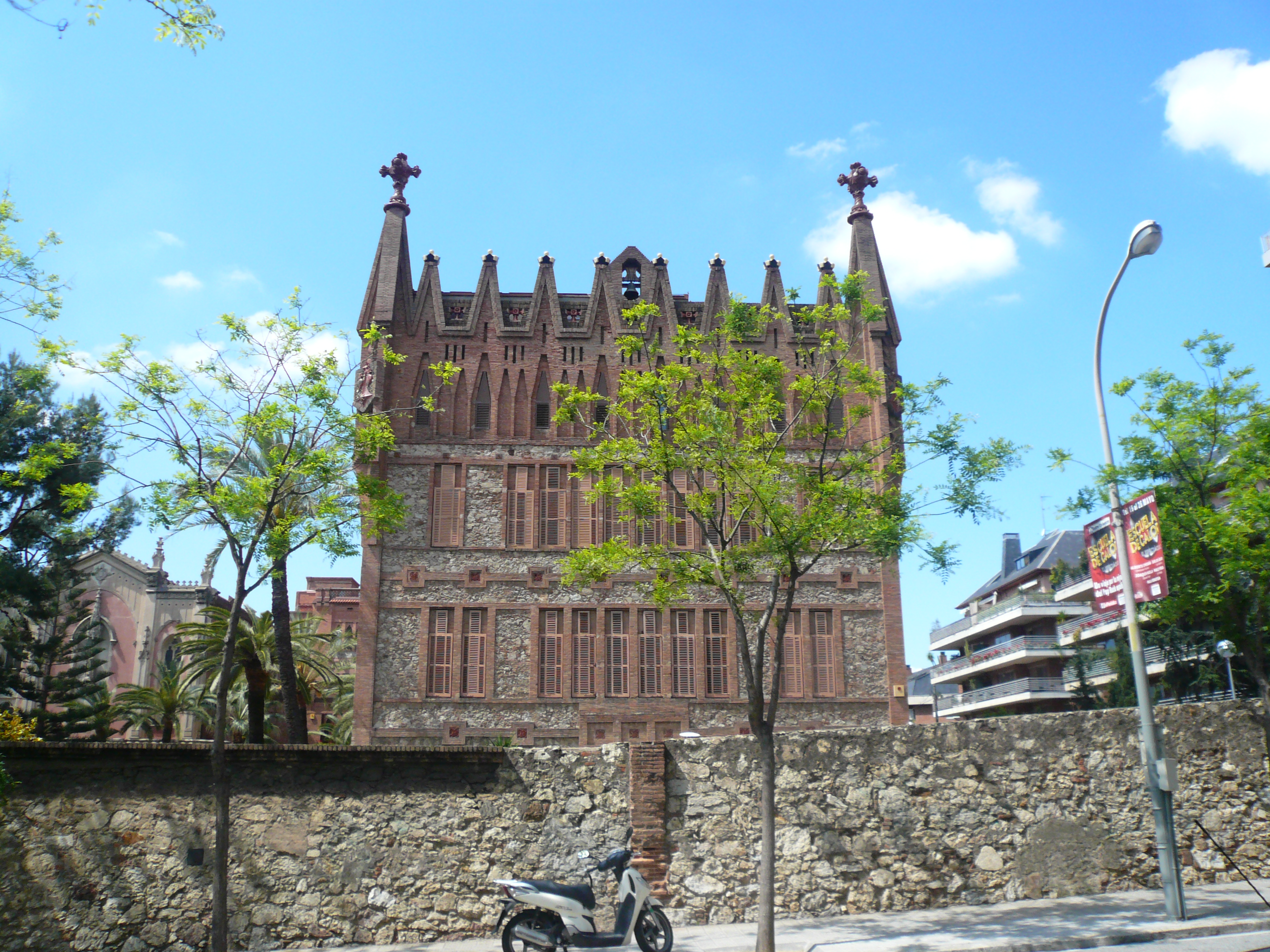
East façade

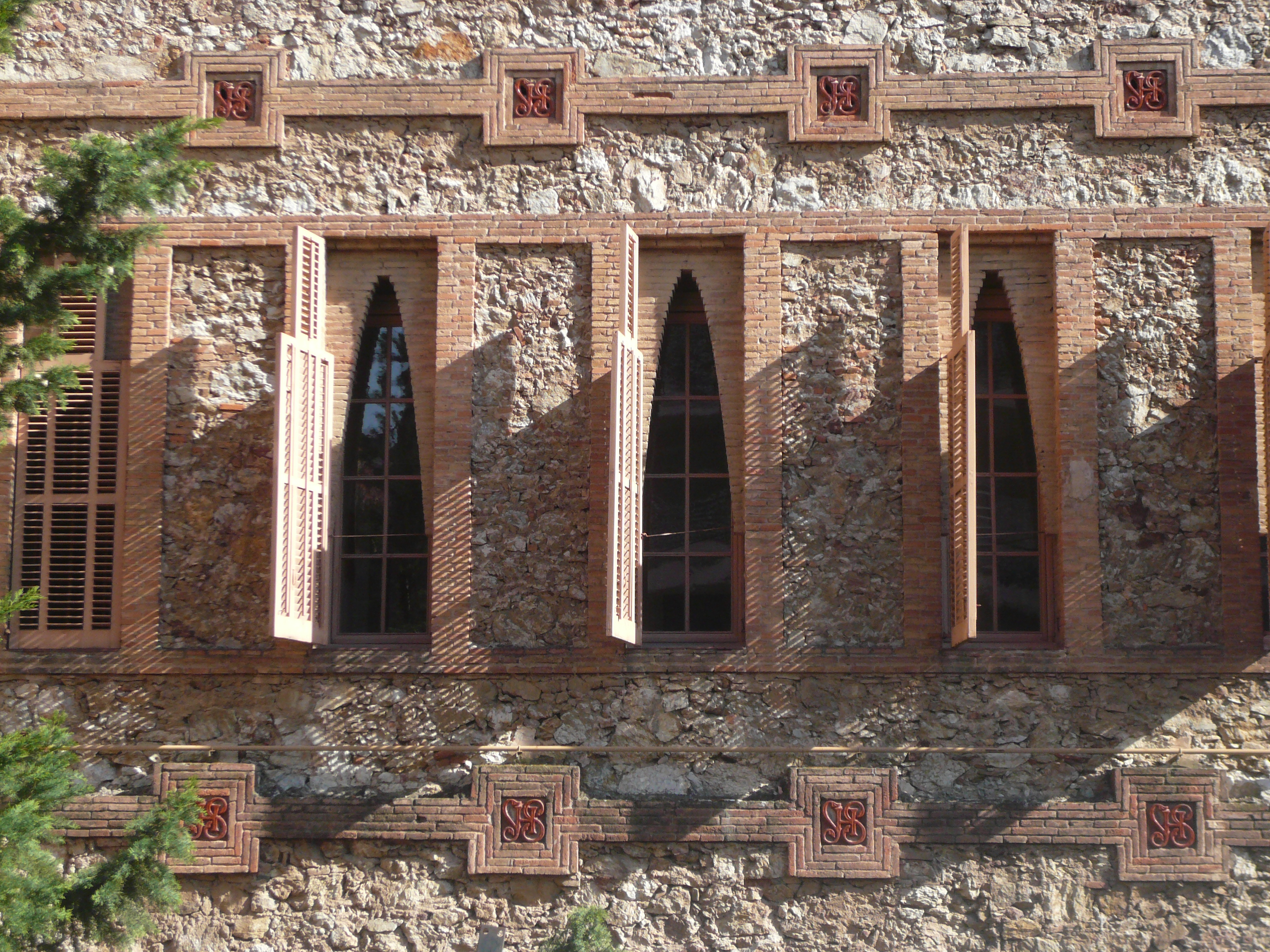
Window details

== See also ==
- List of Gaudí buildings
