= Artigas Gardens =

Public garden system in La Pobla de Lillet, Barcelona

Coordinates: 42°15′13″N 1°58′30″E

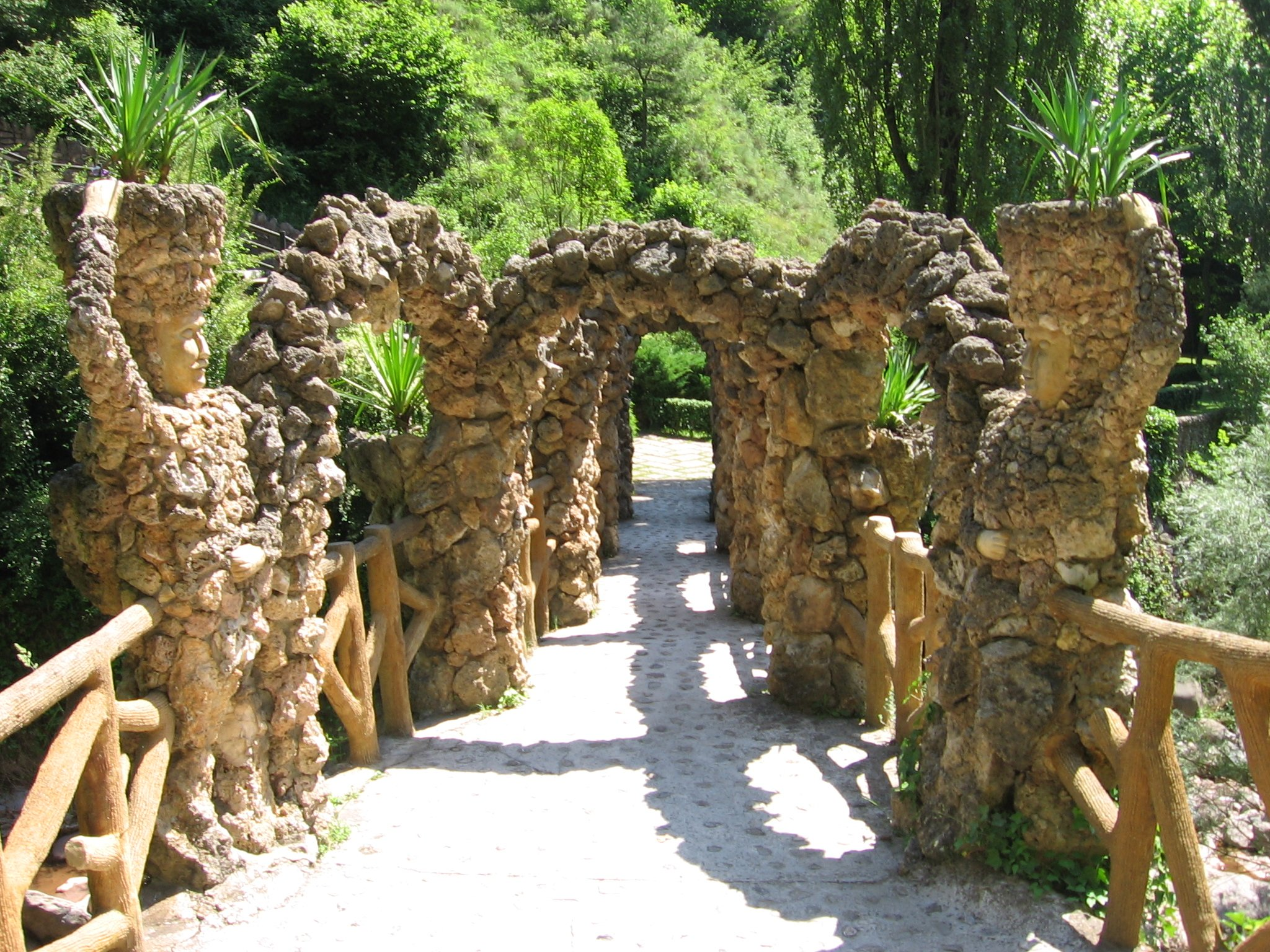
- Interactive map of Artigas Gardens
- Type: Public garden
- Location: La Pobla de Lillet, Barcelona
- Designer: Antoni Gaudí
- Operator: Reial Càtedra Gaudí
- Open: Yes

The Artigas Gardens (Catalan: Els Jardins de Can Artigas) are a park in La Pobla de Lillet, Barcelona. Built between 1905 and 1906, they were designed by the Modernista architect Antoni Gaudí. As with many others of his works, Gaudí filled the gardens with arches and Catholic symbols. By the end of 1971, the gardens were practically abandoned. In 1992, they were restored under the supervision of the Reial Càtedra Gaudí. The current sculptures are the work of Ramon Millet i Domènech.

== History and description ==
=== Design, building process ===
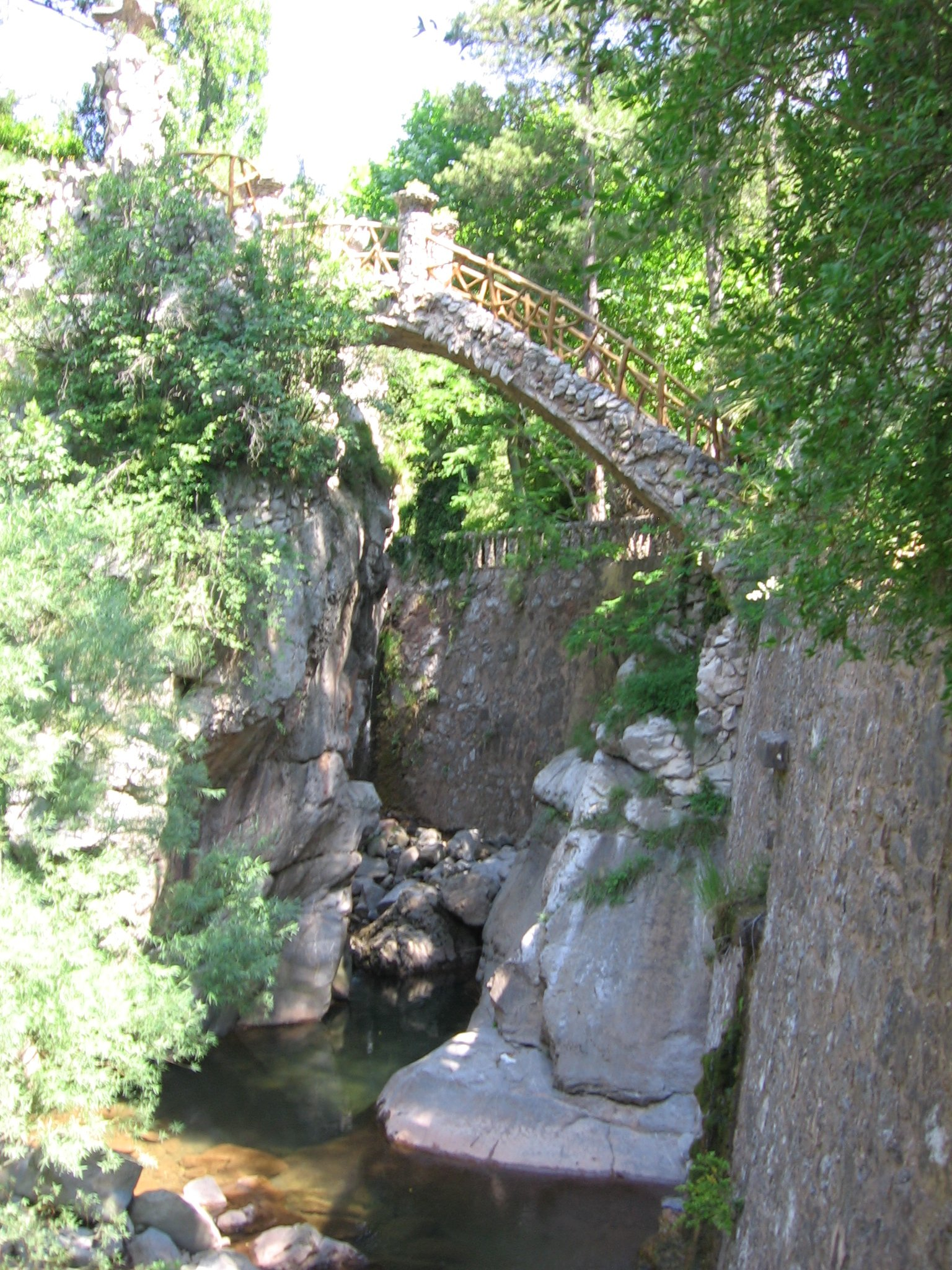
A bridge in the garden, which Gaudí designed as thanks to a friend

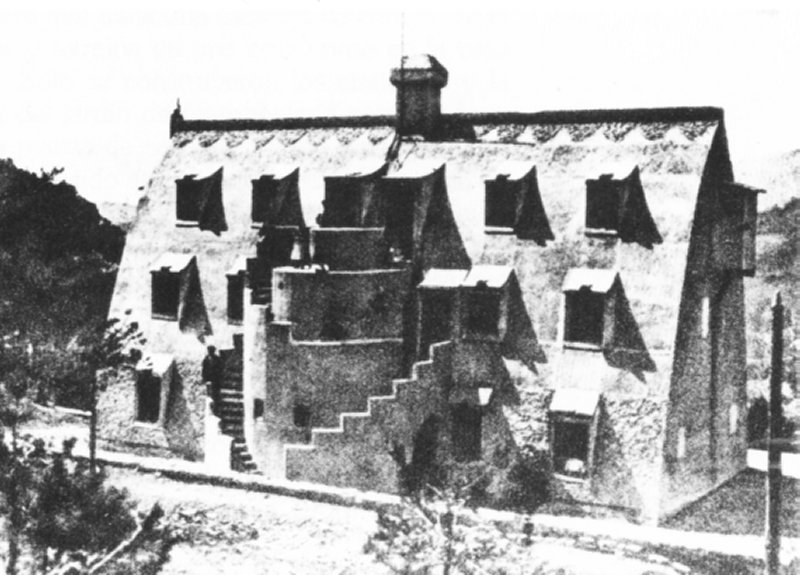
The chalet of Catllaràs (1905), built by Gaudí in Lillet.

In 1905, Gaudí travelled to Lillet to build the chalet of Catllaràs, a mountain refuge for the engineers of the coal mine that supplied the Asland cement plant in the nearby municipality of Castellar de n'Hug. The cement plant was owned by Eusebi Güell, a rich industrialist who was Gaudí's principal patron. While in Lillet, Gaudí stayed in the house of the textile magnate, Joan Artigas i Alart, who had an estate named Font de la Magnèsia, on the Llobregat river. As thanks for the hospitality of Mr. Artigas, Gaudí designed these gardens for him.

Gaudí had done a similar project, although on a smaller scale, at Park Güell which he was then building in the Gràcia District of Barcelona. He sent some of Park Güell's workers to Lillet, and the resulting stylistic and structural similarities between the two locations are obvious. As he did with Parc Güell, Gaudí designed the Artigas Gardens fully integrated with the surrounding natural environment. He also built an artificial grotto, a typical Gaudí hallmark, like the one he had designed for the cascade of the Parc de la Ciutadella.

=== Features, symbols ===
Gaudí designed the garden for the visitor, with a path highlighting several places of interest:

- La Glorieta, situated in a higher location, functioning as an overlook
- La Cova, original site of the Font de la Magnèsia, where Gaudí used catenary arches, one of his most common construction elements
- La Cascada, a stone fountain in the shape of a typical Gaudi "trencadís", decorated with plant motifs made of steel reinforced concrete
- El Berenador, at the side of the Arch Bridge, which has two human forms, one male and the other female. Also featured on the Glorieta path are the forms of entwined snakes made of conglomerate.

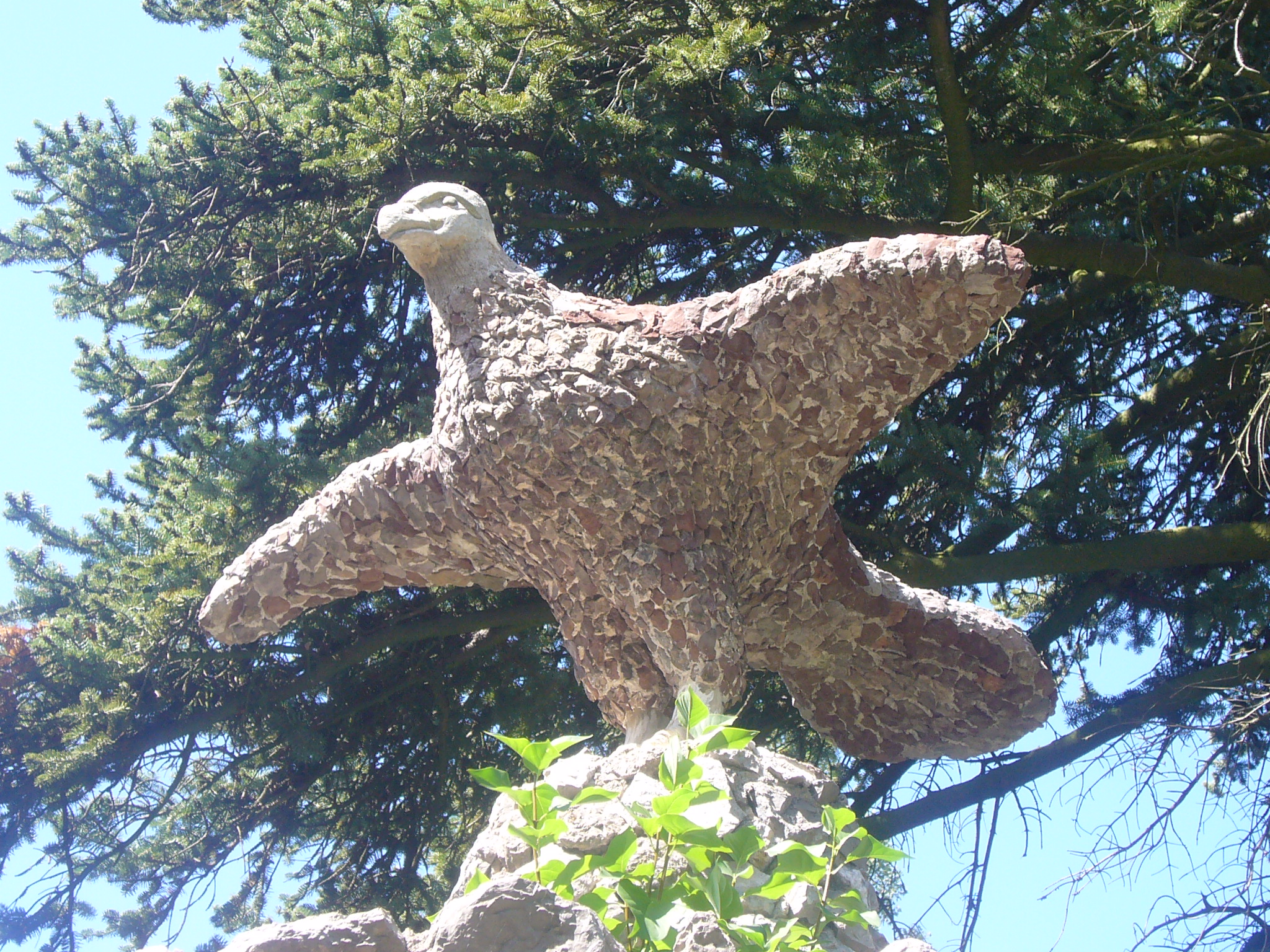
An eagle in the garden

As with so many others of his works, Gaudí filled the gardens with Christian symbols. For these gardens, he took the symbols from the four gospels. Tetramorph images are found throughout the park: the angel of Saint Matthew at la Cascada; the eagle of Saint John at the Coix arch bridge, which crosses the Llobregat river; the lion of Saint Mark at la Pèrgola; and the bull of Saint Luke at the Bull Fountain. These four images are situated in the form of a cross.

=== Restoration ===
By the end of 1971, the gardens were practically abandoned when an article about the Gardens was published which brought Gaudí's authorship to light. In 1992, they were restored under the supervision of the Reial Càtedra Gaudí. The current sculptures are the work of Ramon Millet i Domènech. The gardens are now owned by the municipality and are open to the public.

== Gallery ==
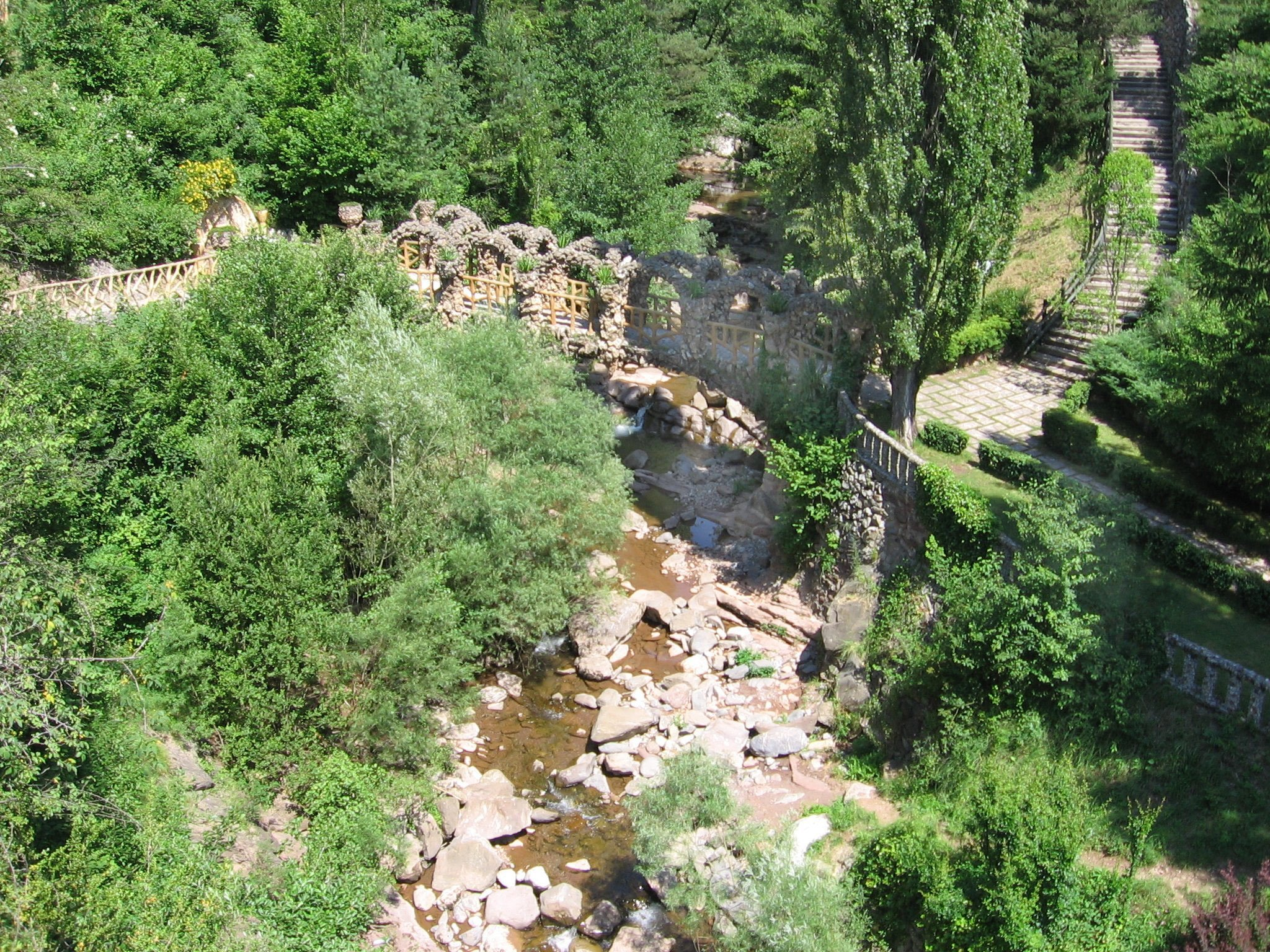
High view, with a bridge visible

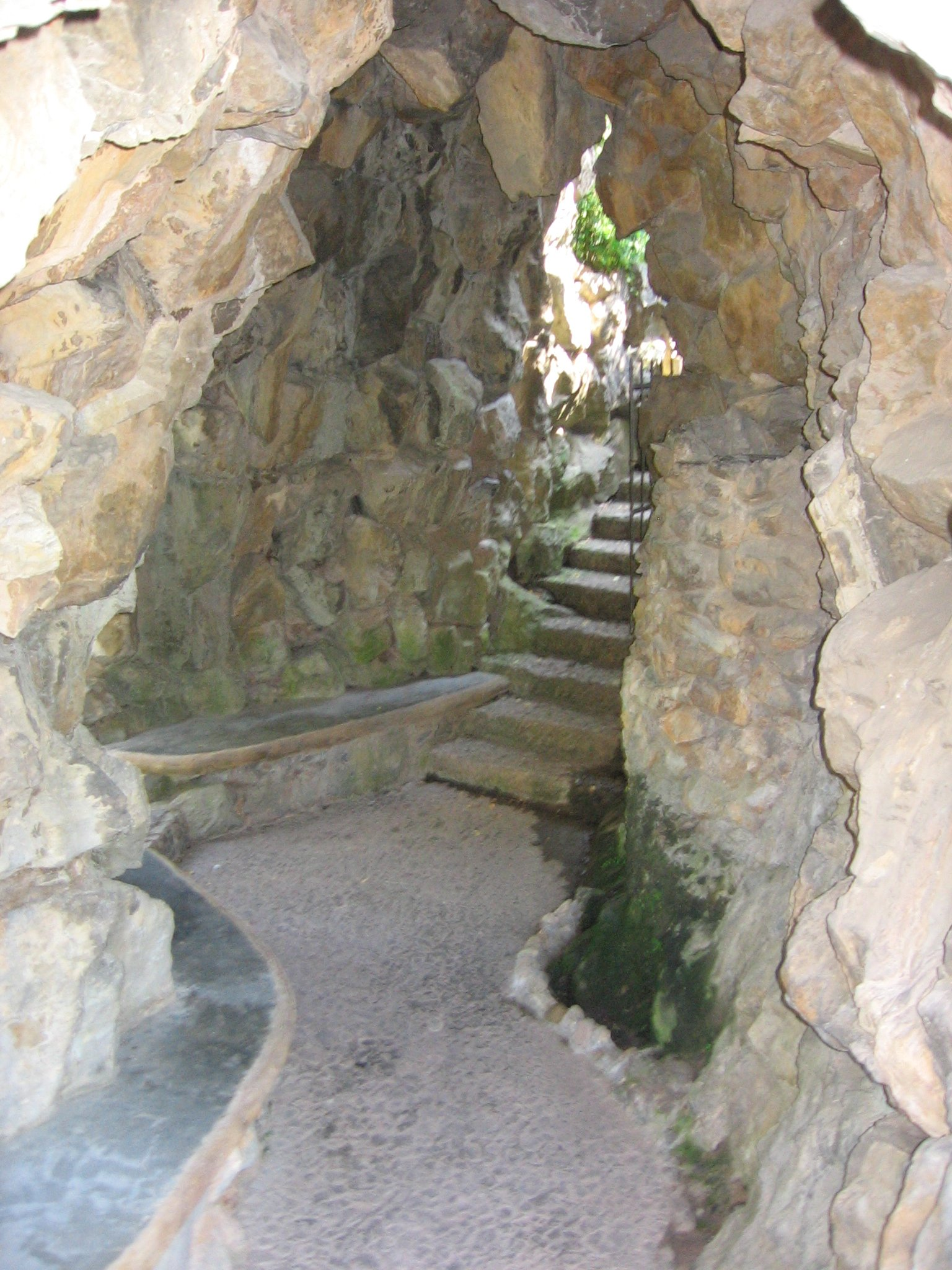
Tunnel

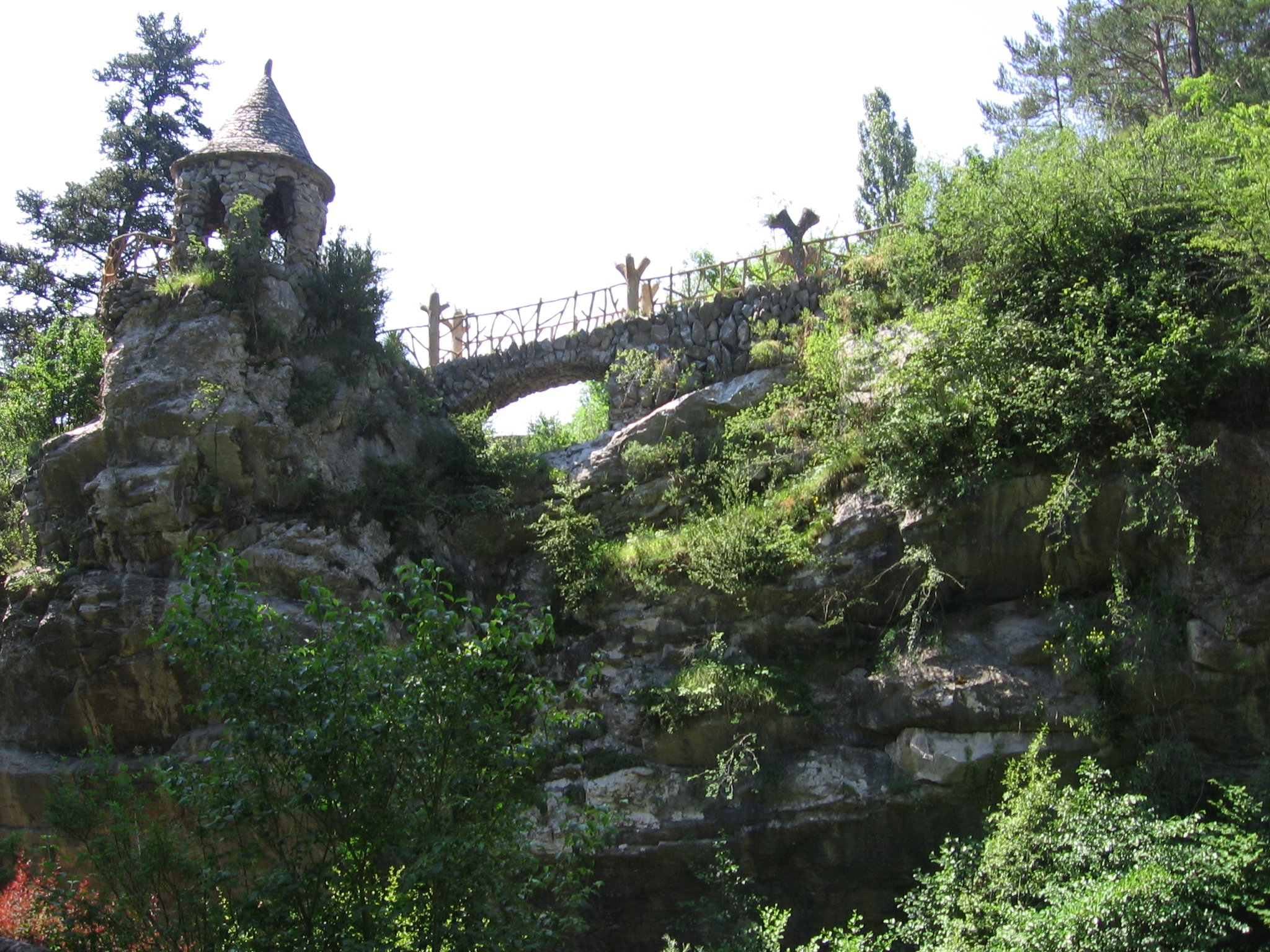
View from below a ridge

== See also ==
- List of Gaudí buildings
- Catalan Modernisme
- Pergola
