= Sagrada Família Schools =

Building in Barcelona, Spain

Coordinates: 41.4030°N 2.1742°E

- Escoles de la Sagrada Família
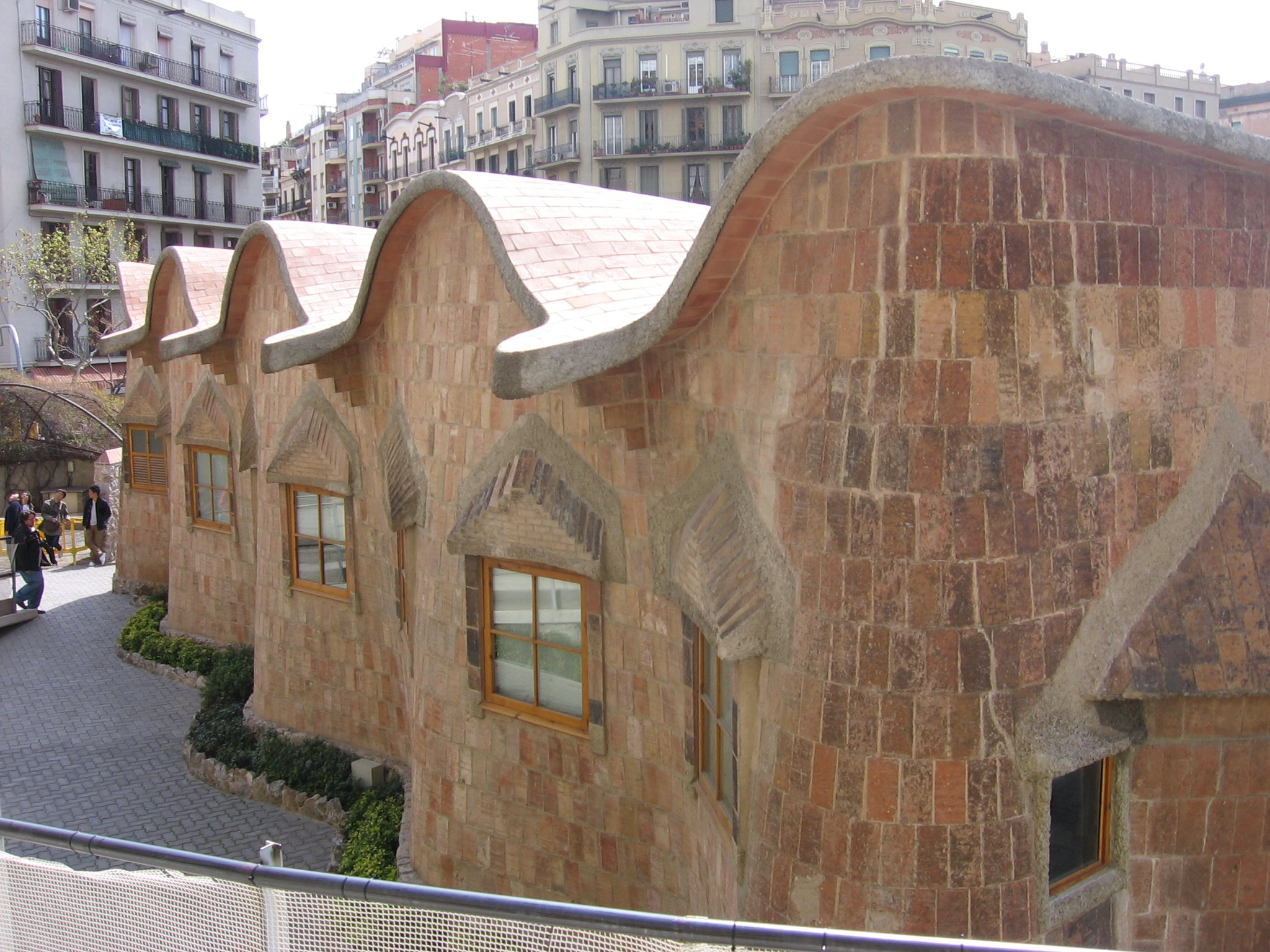

General information
- Location: Barcelona, Catalonia, Spain

Design and construction
- Architect: Antoni Gaudí

The Sagrada Família Schools (Catalan: Escoles de la Sagrada Família, Spanish: Escuelas de la Sagrada Familia) building was constructed in 1909 by the modern Catalan architect Antoni Gaudí near the site of the Basílica de la Sagrada Família. It was a small school building for the children of the workers building the Sagrada Família, although other children of the neighborhood attended, especially from the underprivileged classes. The teaching was in the charge of Magin Espina Pujol, math teacher and friend of Gaudí, whose photo teaching classes are in the current school.

The building has a rectangular footprint of 10 m (33 ft) by 20 m (66 ft), and contains three classrooms, a hall, and a chapel, with lavatories in an addition to the building. The construction was done with a brick facade in three overlapping layers, following the Catalan technical tradition. Both the walls and the roof have a wavy form that gives the structure a sensation of lightness but, at the same time, great strength. On the exterior three areas intended as open-air classrooms were covered with iron pergolas.

The building has been seen as an example of constructive genius and has served as a source of inspiration for many architects for its simplicity, stamina, original volume, functionality, and geometrical purity. Its undulating form has been applied by architects like Le Corbusier, Pier Luigi Nervi, Félix Candela, and Santiago Calatrava.

== History ==
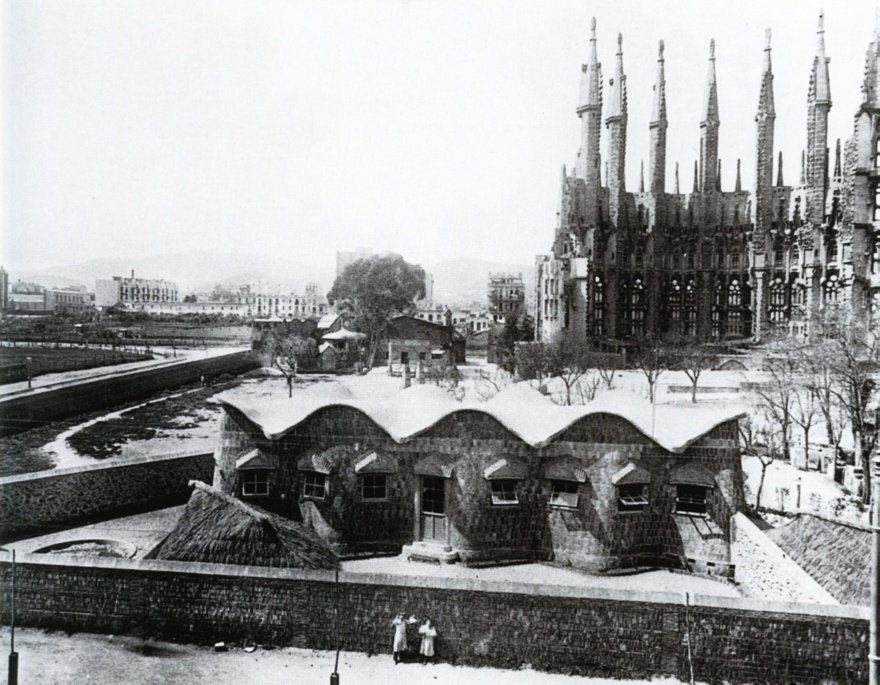
The schools in their original location in 1909

The building was designed on the commission of the Devout of San José, created in 1866 by Josep Maria Bocabella, founder of the Basilica of the Sagrada Familia. Its principal promoter was Gil Parés, chaplain of the Sagrada Familia, who was the school's principal until 1930. At first he followed the pedagogic method of Andrés Manjón, founder of the school of Ave Maria de Granada, but from 1915 on he applied the Montessori method.

The schools were inaugurated on November 15, 1909 by the Bishop of Barcelona, Juan José Laguarda y Fenollera. It was originally located on ground destined to face the glory facade, in a site which would not be needed during the initial phases of the planned development of the Sagrada Família.

The school suffered grave damage during the Spanish Civil War, during which the building was dismantled in blocks and reconstructed later. Francesc Quintana was charged with its restoration in 1936-1937 with limited funds, resulting in its collapse and the need for renewed intervention in 1943 under Quintana. In 2002, the original schools site was required for the ongoing development of the church, and the schools building was again dismantled, and transferred to the southern corner of the site, between Sardenya and Mallorca Streets.

== See also ==
- List of Gaudí buildings

== Bibliography ==
- Joan Bassegoda Nonell: Gaudí o espacio, luz y equilibrio, Criterio, Madrid, 2002, ISBN 84-95437-10-4.
- Maria Antonietta Crippa: Gaudí, Taschen, Colonia, 2007, ISBN 978-3-8228-2519-8.
- María José Gómez Gimeno: La Sagrada Familia, Mundo Flip Ediciones, 2006, ISBN 84-933983-4-9.
