= Palau Güell =

Mansion in Barcelona designed by Gaudí

Palacio Güell
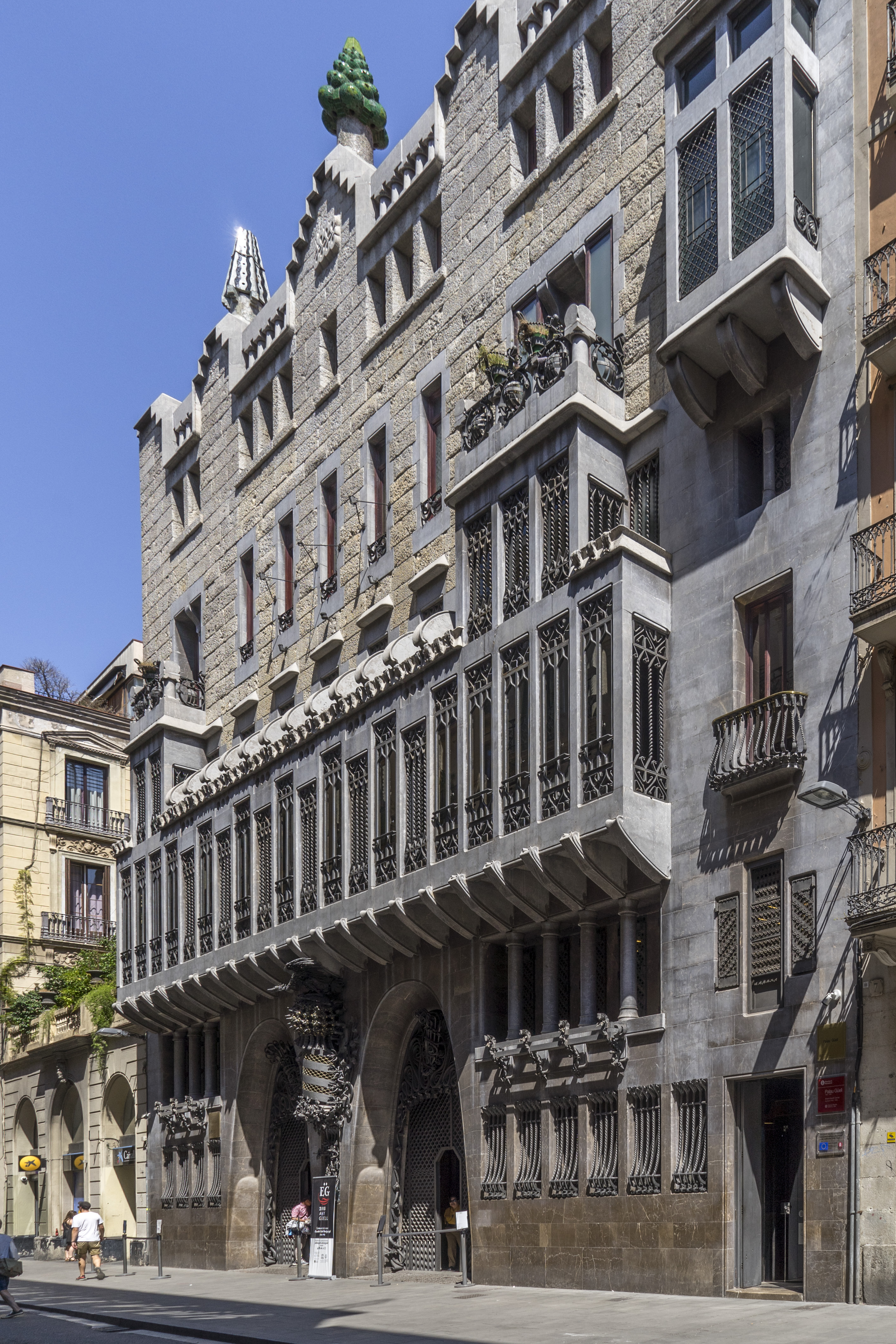
- Interactive map of the Palacio Güell area

General information
- Location: Barcelona, Spain
- Coordinates: 41°22′44″N 2°10′27″E

Design and construction
- Architect: Antoni Gaudí

UNESCO World Heritage Site
- Part of: Works of Antoni Gaudí
- Criteria: Cultural: (i), (ii), (iv)
- Reference: 320-002
- Inscription: 1984 (8th Session)
- Extensions: 2005

Spanish Cultural Heritage
- Type: Non-movable
- Criteria: Monument
- Designated: 24 July 1969
- Reference no.: RI-51-0003821

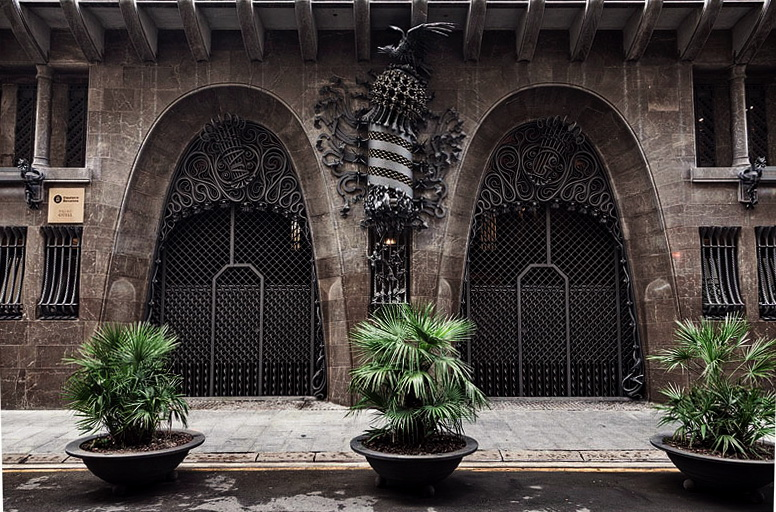
Front entrance allowed horse-drawn carriages to enter the home through one door and exit through the other.

The Palau Güell (Catalan pronunciation: [pəˈlaw ˈɣweʎ], English: Güell Palace) is a mansion designed by the architect Antoni Gaudí for the industrial tycoon Eusebi Güell, and was built between 1886 and 1888. It is situated on the Carrer Nou de la Rambla, in the El Raval neighborhood of Barcelona in Catalonia, Spain. It is part of the UNESCO World Heritage Site "Works of Antoni Gaudí".

The home is centered around the main room for entertaining high society guests. Guests entered the home in horse-drawn carriages through the front iron gates, which featured a parabolic arch and intricate patterns of forged ironwork resembling seaweed and in some parts a horsewhip. Gaudí placed the bronze sculpture of a phoenix between the two gates, a mythical animal that is an emblem of the economic and cultural renaissance experienced by Catalan society. Animals could be taken down a ramp and kept in the livery stable in the basement where the servants resided, while the guests went up the stairs to the receiving room. The ornate walls and ceilings of the receiving room disguised small viewing windows high on the walls where the owners of the home could view their guests from the upper floor and get a "sneak peek" before greeting them, in case they needed to adjust their attire accordingly.

The main party room has a tall ceiling with small holes near the top where lanterns were hung at night from the outside to give the appearance of a starlit sky.

In 2004, visits by the public were completely suspended due to renovations; some of the stone used in the original construction was weak and had cracked over the years causing structural problems within the building. It is currently completely open, with all restoration work completed in April 2011.

It was used in Antonioni's film The Passenger as a backdrop for the first meeting between Jack Nicholson and Maria Schneider.

== See also ==
- List of Gaudí buildings
- List of Modernisme buildings in Barcelona
