= La Pobla de Lillet =

- Municipality
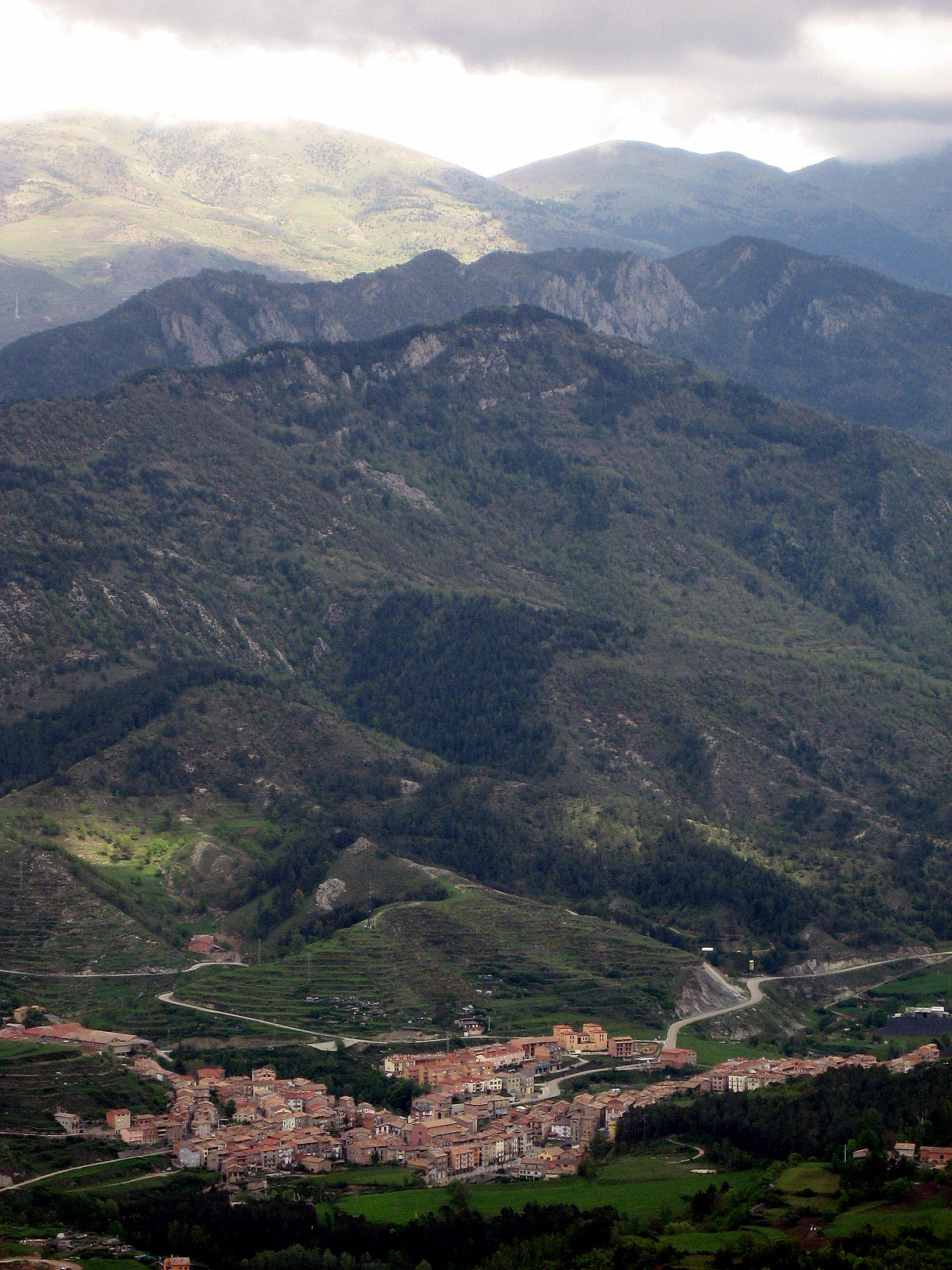

- Location in Catalonia La Pobla de Lillet (Spain)
- Coordinates: 42.244°N 1.975°E
- Country: Spain
- Community: Catalonia
- Province: Barcelona
- Comarca: Berguedà

Government
  - Mayor: Vicenç Linares Clota (2015) (CiU)

Area
  - Total: 51.4 km^{2} (19.8 sq mi)
- Elevation: 843 m (2,766 ft)

Population (2025-01-01)
  - Total: 1,105
  - Density: 21.5/km^{2} (55.7/sq mi)
- Demonym: Poblatà
- Postal code: 08969
- Website: www.poblalillet.cat

La Pobla de Lillet (Catalan pronunciation: [lə ˈpob.blə ðə liˈʎɛt]) is a municipality in the comarca of the Berguedà in Catalonia. It is located in the upper valley of the Llobregat river and is linked to Guardiola de Berguedà by Road B-402.

The town is home to the Artigas Gardens, a park designed by Antoni Gaudí in the 1900s. Other sights include the 15th-century bridge, the Sanctuary of Falgars and remains of the late 13th-century fortress.

== Transportation ==
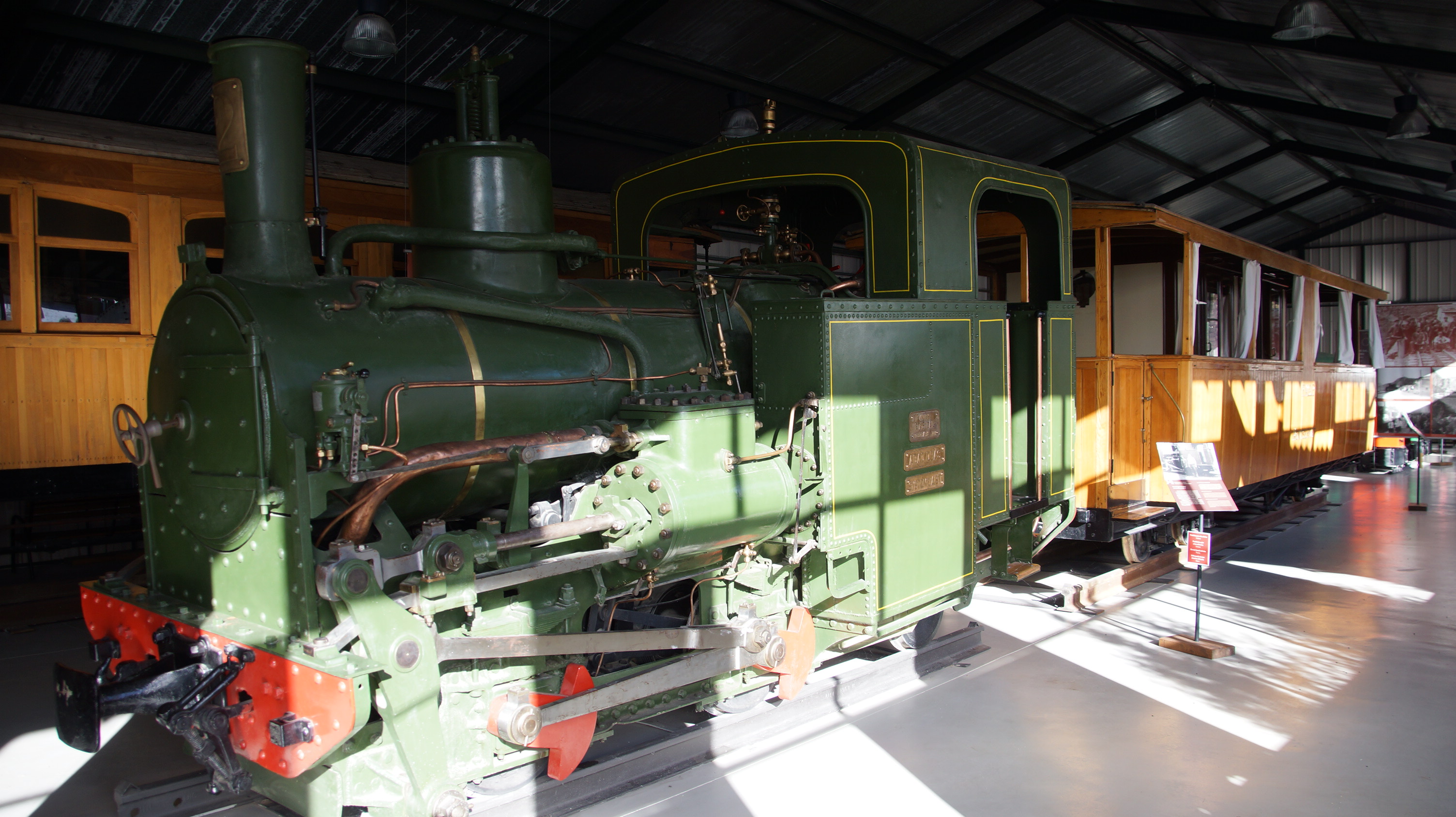
Steam locomotive with 600 mm gauge of Ateliers de Construction de la Meuse in Liège (Belgium), 1901

The Ferrocarril Turístic de l'Alt Llobregat is a 600 mm gauge tourist railway that runs from the narrow gauge railway museum at La Pobla de Lillet to the cement museum at Clot del Moro.

== History ==
- Castell de Lillet is a ruined castle. The remains are located on a large rock, near the torrent of Junyent to the left of the Arija.Built in the 9th century and re-enforced in the 14th century the castle remained active till the 15th century.

On September 8, 1864 La Pobla de Lillet suffered a major flood that took away a mill and two houses and in which a four-year-old boy died.

== Festivals ==
- Easter Monday - Falgars Dance and Cinquagesma Festival
- 1st Sunday of October- Festa Major del Roser
