= Güell (disambiguation) =

Güell or Guell may refer to:

== People ==
- Corwin C. Guell, member of the Wisconsin State Assembly
- Eusebi Güell (1846–1918), Catalan entrepreneur who profited from the industrial revolution in Catalonia in the late 19th century
- Gonzalo Güell (1895–1985), Cuban lawyer, Foreign Minister of Cuba 1956–1959 and Prime Minister of Cuba 1958–1959
- Isabel Güell i López (1872-1956), Spanish composer, pianist, organist

== Geography ==
- Güell, river in Catalonia, Spain

== Buildings and structures ==
- Bodegas Güell, architectural complex in Garraf, Sitges (Barcelona) designed by Antoni Gaudí
- Church of Colònia Güell, unfinished work by Antoni Gaudí
- Güell Pavilions, complex of buildings near Pedralbes, Barcelona, by the architect Antoni Gaudí, built between 1884 and 1887
- Palau Güell, mansion in Barcelona, Catalonia, Spain designed by Antoni Gaudí for the Catalan industrial tycoon Eusebi Güell
- Park Güell, garden complex with architectural elements on the hill of El Carmel in the Gràcia district of Barcelona, Catalonia, Spain

== See also ==
- Cuello
- Geulle
- Guella
- Quella
