= Bodegas Güell =

Winery in Sitges, Spain

Coordinates: 41°15′21.09″N 1°54′19.55″E

Güell Winery
- Bodegas Güell / Celler Güell
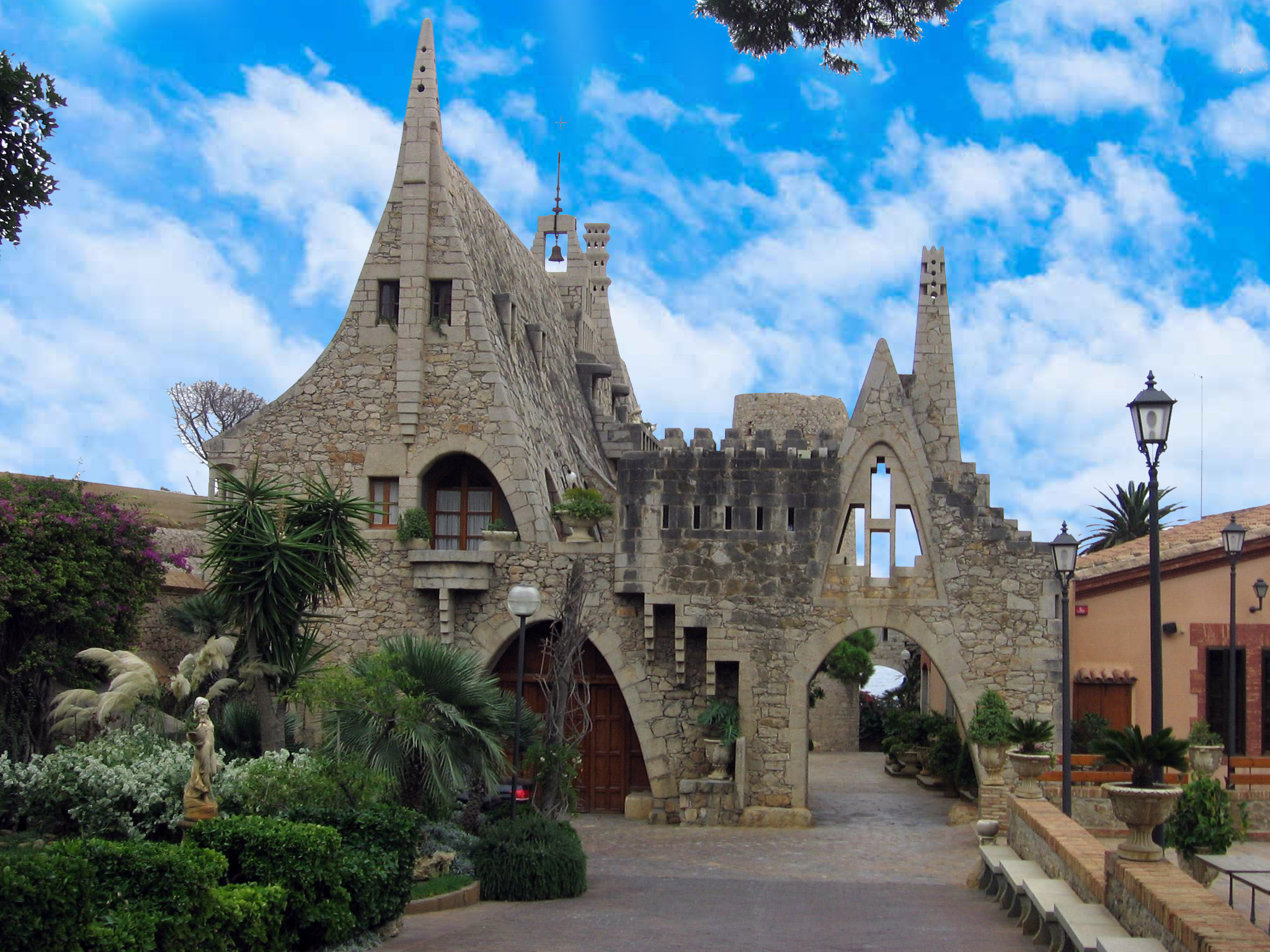
- Interactive map of the Güell Winery area

General information
- Type: Winery
- Architectural style: Modernisme
- Location: Sitges, Barcelona, Spain

Design and construction
- Architect: Antoni Gaudí

Spanish Cultural Heritage
- Type: Non-movable
- Criteria: Monument
- Designated: 8 November 1988
- Reference no.: RI-51-0005716

Bodegas Güell, in Catalan Celler Güell, is an architectural complex comprising a winery and associated buildings located in Garraf, in the Spanish municipality of Sitges (Barcelona), designed by the Catalan architect Antoni Gaudí.

== History and description ==
Gaudí received the commission for this work in 1882 from his patron Eusebi Güell, who had seen Gaudí's work at the Paris Expo in 1878; in this year Gaudí received a number of other commissions including the Palau Güell, the Pavellons Güell in Pedralbes, the Park Güell and the crypt of the Church of Colònia Güell in Santa Coloma de Cervelló. The original commission consisted of the winery and several hunting pavilions, but the latter were never built. The whole complex was located on the La Cuadra estate in Garraf, Sitges and was the property of the Count Güell. The winery buildings were finally built between 1895 and 1897, under the direction of Francesc Berenguer, Gaudí's assistant.

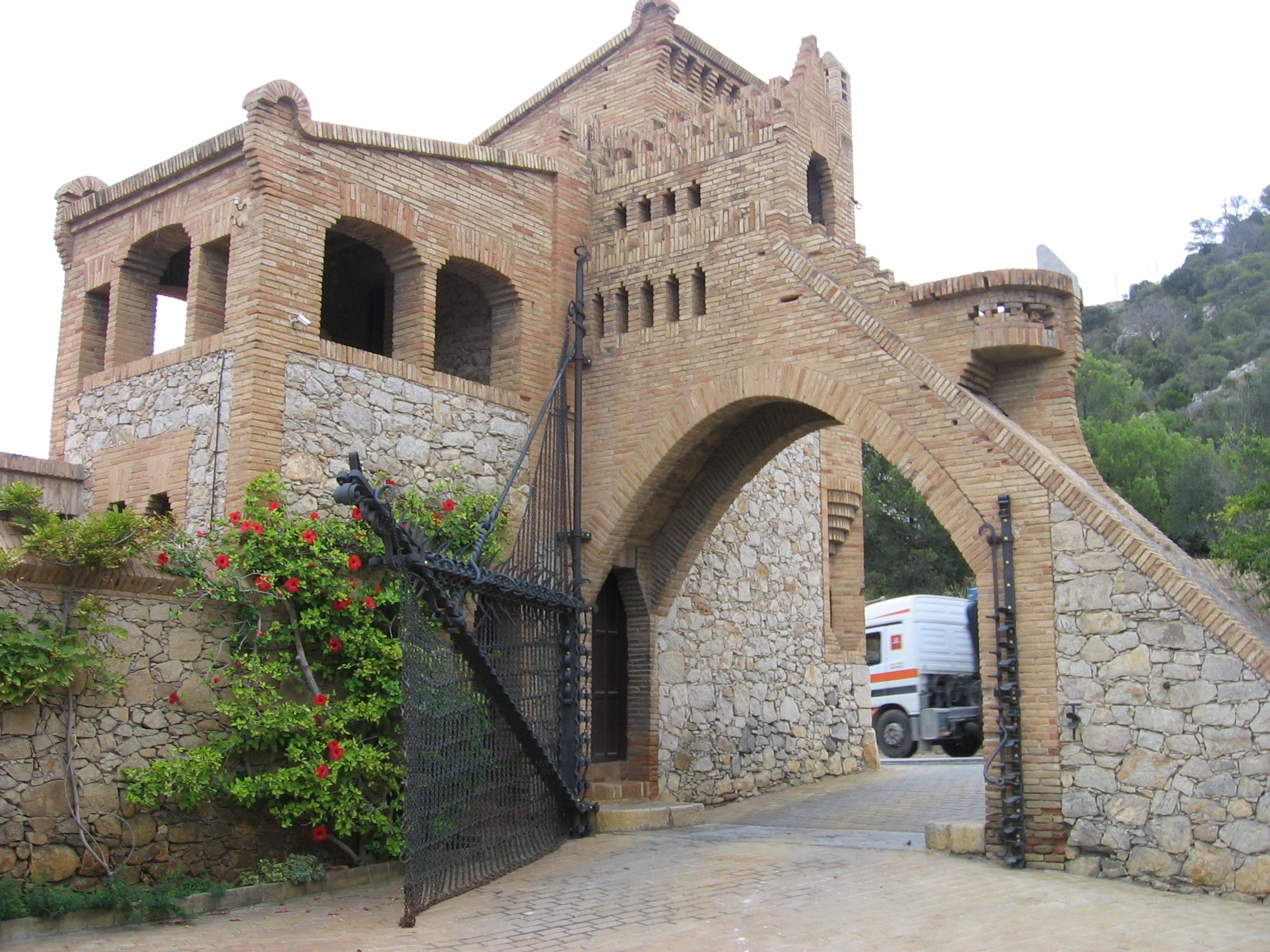
Pabellón de portería.

The winery has a triangular frontal profile, with almost vertical roofs, steep sloping stone slabs, finished off with sets of chimneys and two doors that connect it to the old building. There are three floors: the ground floor for parking vehicles, an apartment on the first floor and a domed chapel on the top floor.

Count Güell actually produced wine in the winery, which was served on the ships of the Compañía Transatlántica Española shipping line and was also exported to Cuba. However, production stopped in 1936 due to lack of commercial success.

There is currently a restaurant in the Bodegas Güell.

== See also ==
- List of Gaudí buildings
- Catalan Modernism

== Sources ==
- Joan Bassegoda Nonell: Gaudí o espacio, luz y equilibrio, Criterio, Madrid, 2002, ISBN 84-95437-10-4.
