= Gaudí House Museum =

Biographical museum in Spain

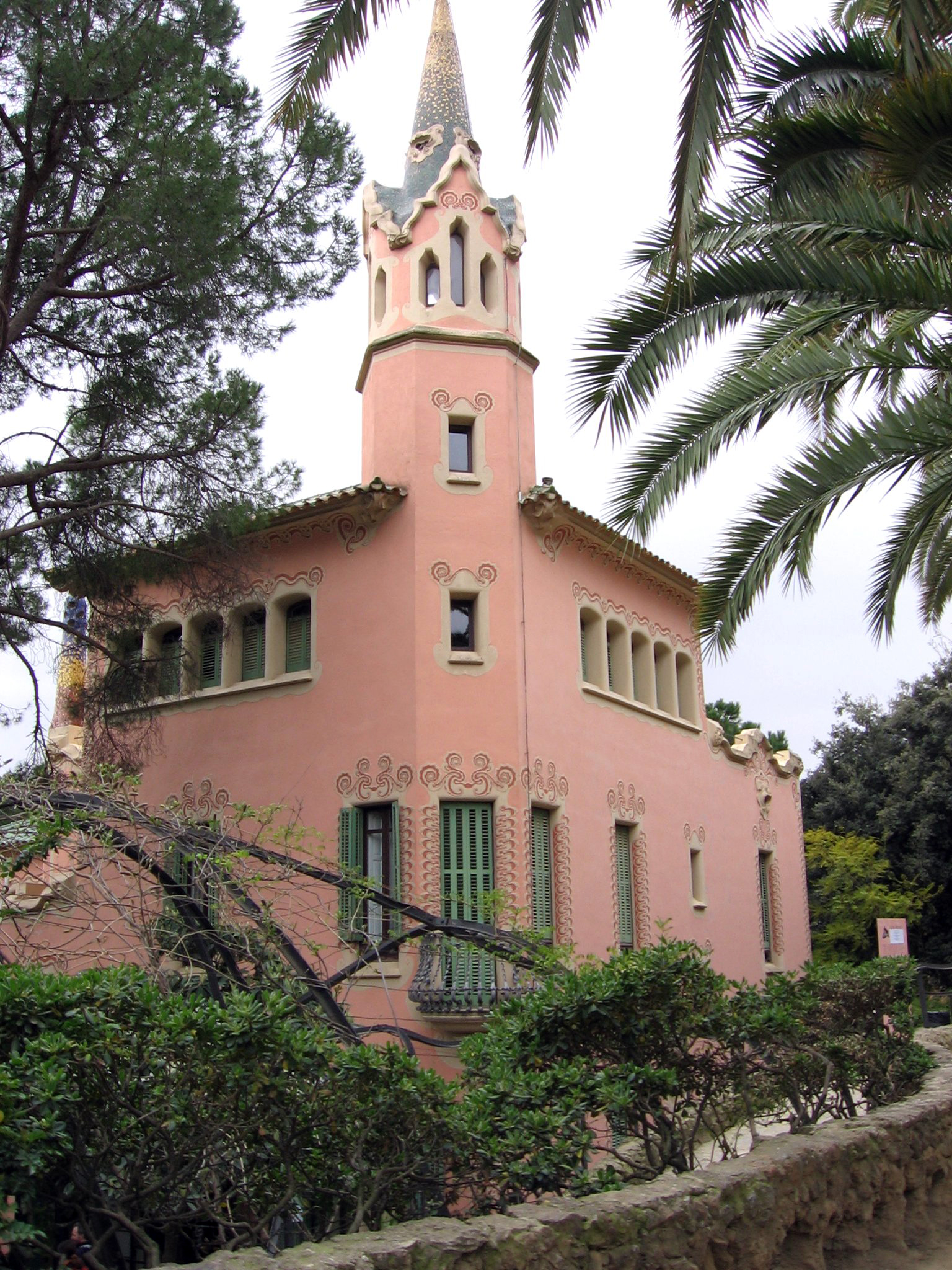
- View of the Gaudí House Museum from the Park Güell
- Established: 28 September 1963; 62 years ago
- Location: Park Güell, Barcelona, Catalonia, Spain
- Coordinates: 41°24′48.78″N 2°9′7.78″E
- Type: historic home museum
- Website: www.casamuseugaudi.org

The Gaudí House Museum (Catalan: Casa Museu Gaudí; Spanish: Casa-Museo Gaudí), located within the Park Güell in Barcelona, is a historic home museum that houses a collection of furniture and objects designed by the Catalan architect Antoni Gaudí. It was the residence of Gaudí for almost 20 years, from 1906 until the end of 1925. On 28 September 1963 it opened as a historic home museum.

== History ==
At the end of the 19th century, Catalan industrialist Eusebi Güell i Bacigalupi, after a stay in England, returned to Barcelona with the intention to build a garden city for the Catalan bourgeoisie, on the grounds of the property Can Muntaner de Dalt, which he had acquired in 1899. He commissioned the project, which envisaged the construction of sixty houses with garden and all the services necessary, to Antoni Gaudí. In 1914 the works were stopped and the project was not completed.

Only two of the houses envisaged were finally built: doctor Trias i Domènech's House and what is nowadays Gaudí House-Museum which had to serve as a lure for potential land-buyers. These houses were added to the old house, that already existed in the place and whose owner was Eusebi Güell himself.

The model property, designed by architect Francesc Berenguer i Mestres, built by contractor Josep Casanovas i Pardo and signed by Gaudí himself, was built between 1903 and 1905. It was on sale but it attracted no purchasers. In 1906, Gaudí bought the house and lived there with his father and niece. His father died that very same year, and his niece in 1912. Since then, Gaudí lived there alone until the end of 1925, when, a few months before his death in 1926, moved to the workshop of the Sagrada Família Basilica. In his will, the architect donated the house to the Foundation Board of La Sagrada Família, which sold it to the Chiappo Arietti couple. In 1960 the Friends of Gaudí association started a campaign so as to purchase the house to the Chiappo Arietti's descendants in order to convert it into a museum. Three years later, it opened as Gaudí House-Museum. Josep Maria Garrut had been its chairman since the museum opened to the public until his death in 2008. In 1992 the house was donated to the Construction Board of La Sagrada Família Foundation.

== The building ==
The building has four floors. The ground and first floors are dedicated to the collection opened to the public. The basement is not open to the public and the second floor houses the Enric Casanelles Library, which can be accessed with prior permission.

As for the collection, some rooms, such as the bedroom, the study or the inner door, as well as some personal Gaudí belongings, evoke memories of when the architect lived in this house. They also host a great exhibition of furniture designed by Gaudí for buildings such as Casa Batlló, Casa Calvet, Casa Milà, Casa Vicens or the Colònia Güell's crypt, that along with the wrought iron elements also designed by the architect - exhibited in the garden - are their most valuable objects. The collection also includes furniture, sculptures, paintings, drawings and other objects of Gaudí coworkers that are exhibited in several rooms.

== See also ==
- List of single-artist museums
- List of Gaudí buildings

== Bibliography ==
- BASSEGODA, Joan i GARRUT, Josep M. (1969), Guia de Gaudí, Barcelona: Ediciones literarias y científicas, p. 19-29
- BASSEGODA, Joan. (1989), El gran Gaudí, Sabadell: Editorial AUSA. ISBN 84-86329-44-2, p. 387-390 i 501-503
- GARRUT, Josep M. (1984), "La Casa-Museu Gaudí amb pròleg i dues parts" Antoni Gaudí (1852-1926), Fundació Caixa de Pensions. ISBN 84-505-0683-2
- GARRUT, Josep M. (2002), Casa-Museu Gaudí (1852-1926), Barcelona: Andrés Morón. ISBN 84-931058-1-3, ISBN 84-931058-2-1 i ISBN 84-931058-3-X
- GUEILBURT, Luís. (2003), Gaudí i el Registre de la Propietat, Barcelona: Institut Gaudí de la Construcció. ISBN 84-688-1124-6, p. 149.157
