= Güell Pavilions =

Building complex designed by Antoni Gaudí

Coordinates: 41°23′22″N 2°7′9″E

- Pavellons Güell
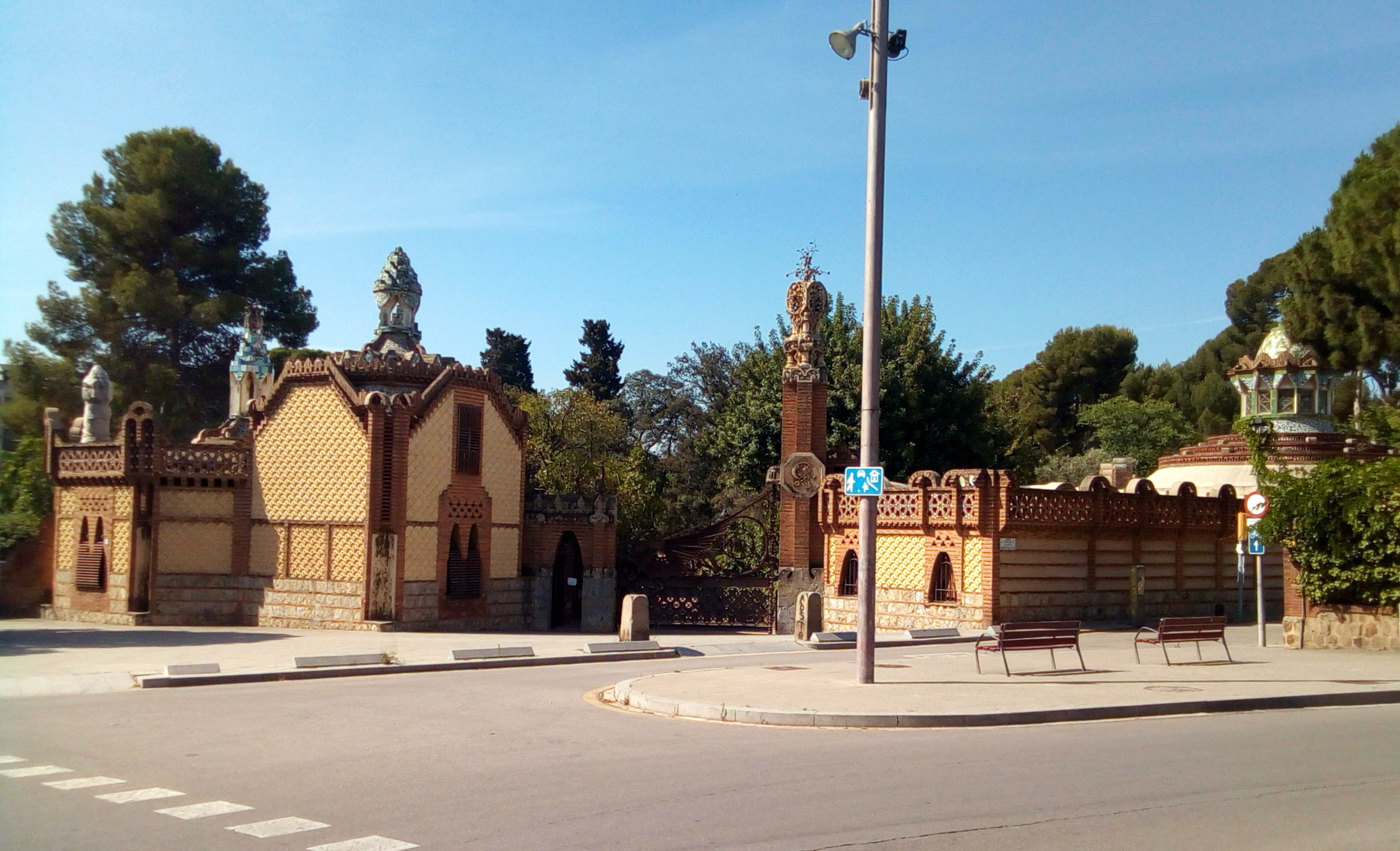

General information
- Architectural style: Modernisme
- Location: Barcelona, Spain

Design and construction
- Architect(s): Antoni Gaudí

Spanish Cultural Heritage
- Type: Non-movable
- Criteria: Monument
- Designated: 24 July 1969
- Reference no.: RI-51-0003822

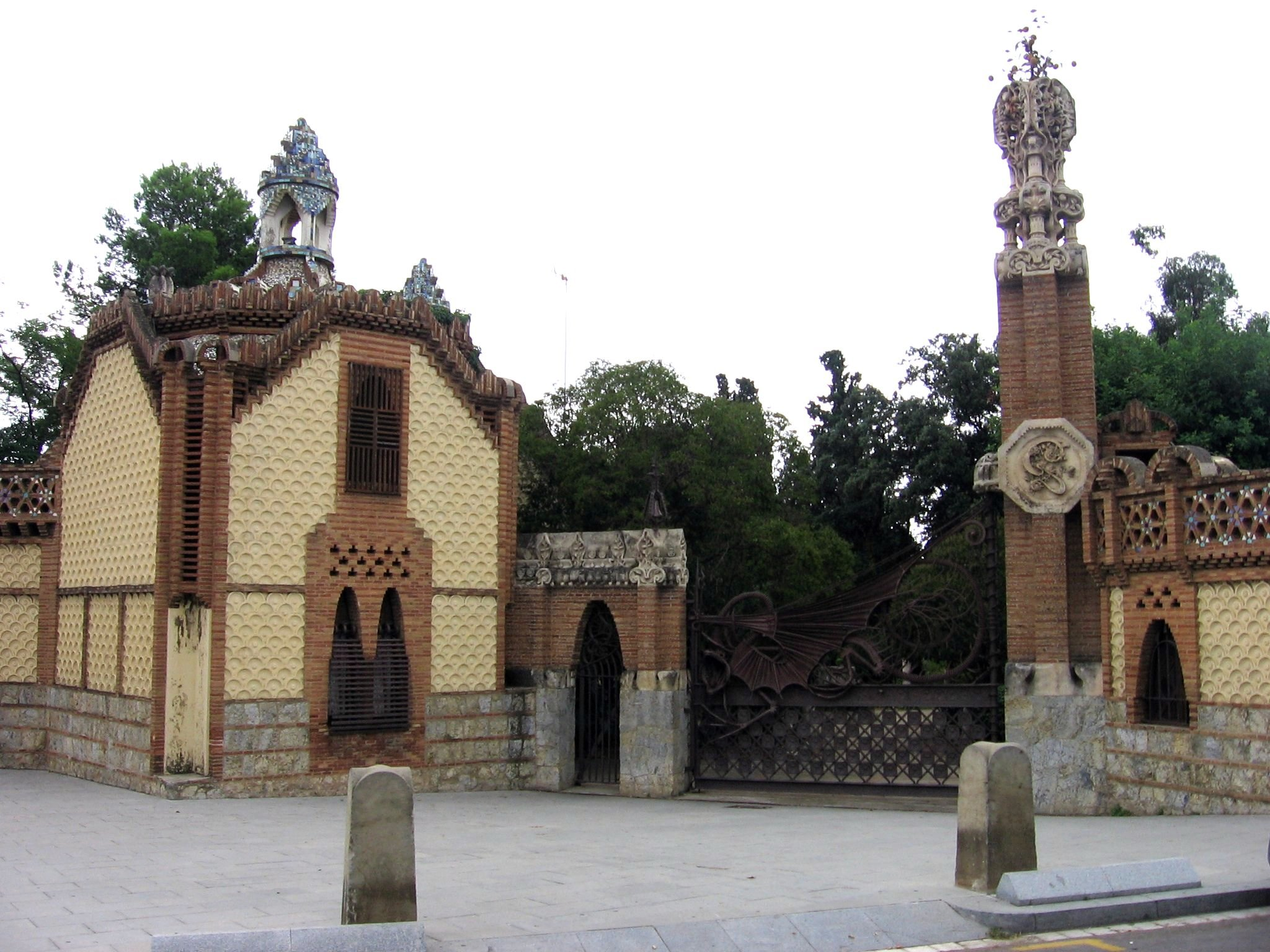
The gatehouse.

The so-called Pavellons Güell, or Güell Pavilions, is a complex of buildings in the neighborhood of Pedralbes, Barcelona, by the Catalan Modernist architect Antoni Gaudí, built between 1884 and 1887.

== History and description ==
Gaudí received the commission from his great patron, count Eusebi Güell.

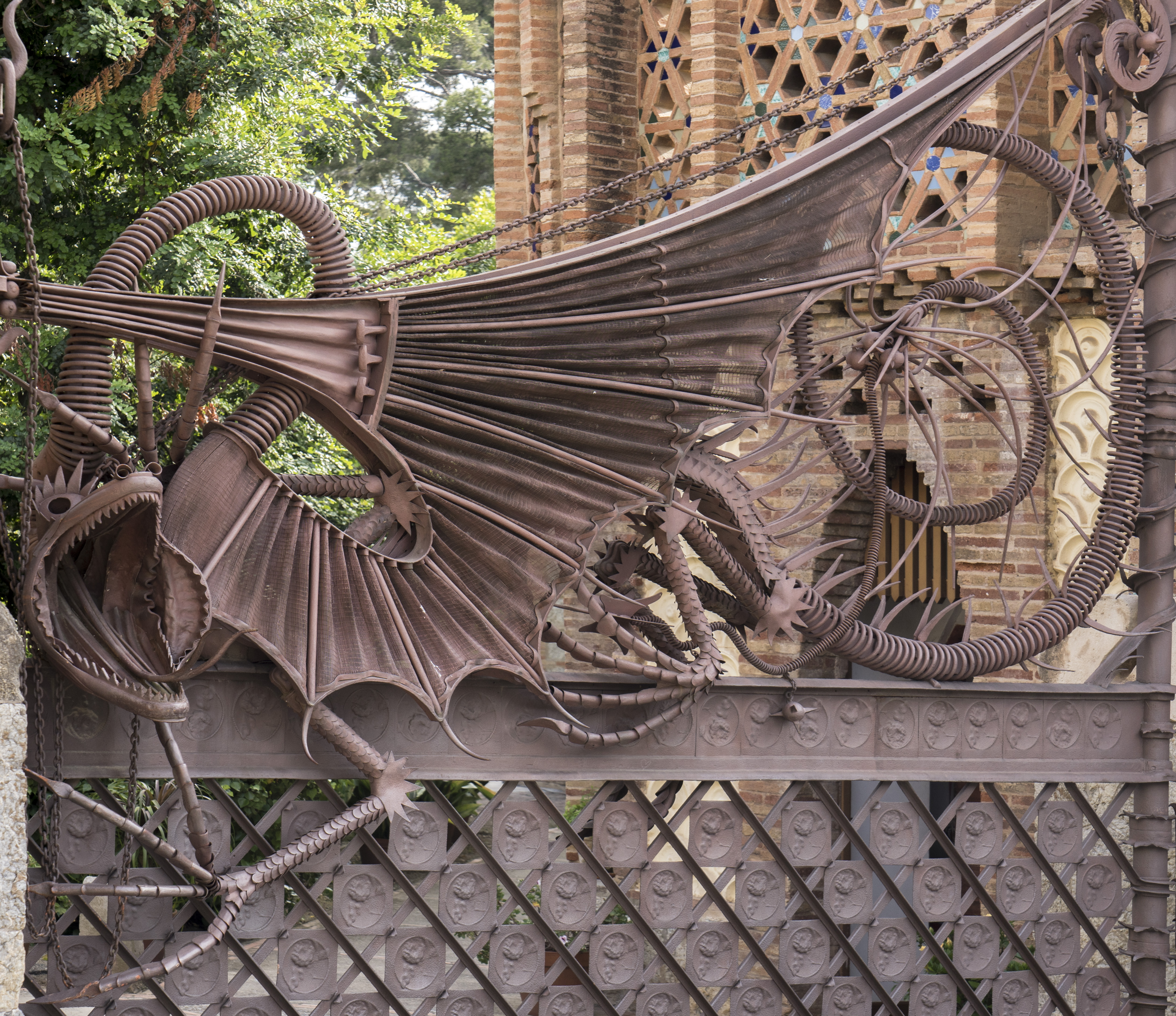
The dragon gate at the Güell Pavilions

Güell had an estate in the Les Corts district of the small town of Sarrià (now part of Barcelona), which included two pieces of land known as Can Feliu and Can Cuyàs de la Riera. The architect Joan Martorell i Montells, one of Gaudí's teachers, had built a Caribbean-style mansion, which stood almost where the Palau Reial de Pedralbes now stands. This house was called Torre Satalia, so christened by Jacinto Verdaguer, a friend of the family. Gaudí was commissioned to remodel the house and build a perimeter wall with gates.

Gaudí proposed an Orientalist design, somewhat reminiscent of Mudejar art. He planned an ashlar wall with several gates, of which the main gate would be a wrought-iron grille in the shape of a dragon, with glass eyes; it represented Ladon, offspring of Typhus, the dragon that guarded the Garden of the Hesperides, which was overcome by Hercules as one of his twelve labours—an episode that was narrated by Jacint Verdaguer in his poem L'Atlàntida, dedicated to Antonio López y López, first marquis of Comillas, who was Eusebi Güell's brother in law. Over the dragon there is an antimony orange-tree, another allusion to the Hesperides. The shape of the dragon corresponds with the position of the stars in the Serpens constellation, because Ladon was turned into a snake as a punishment for stealing the oranges.

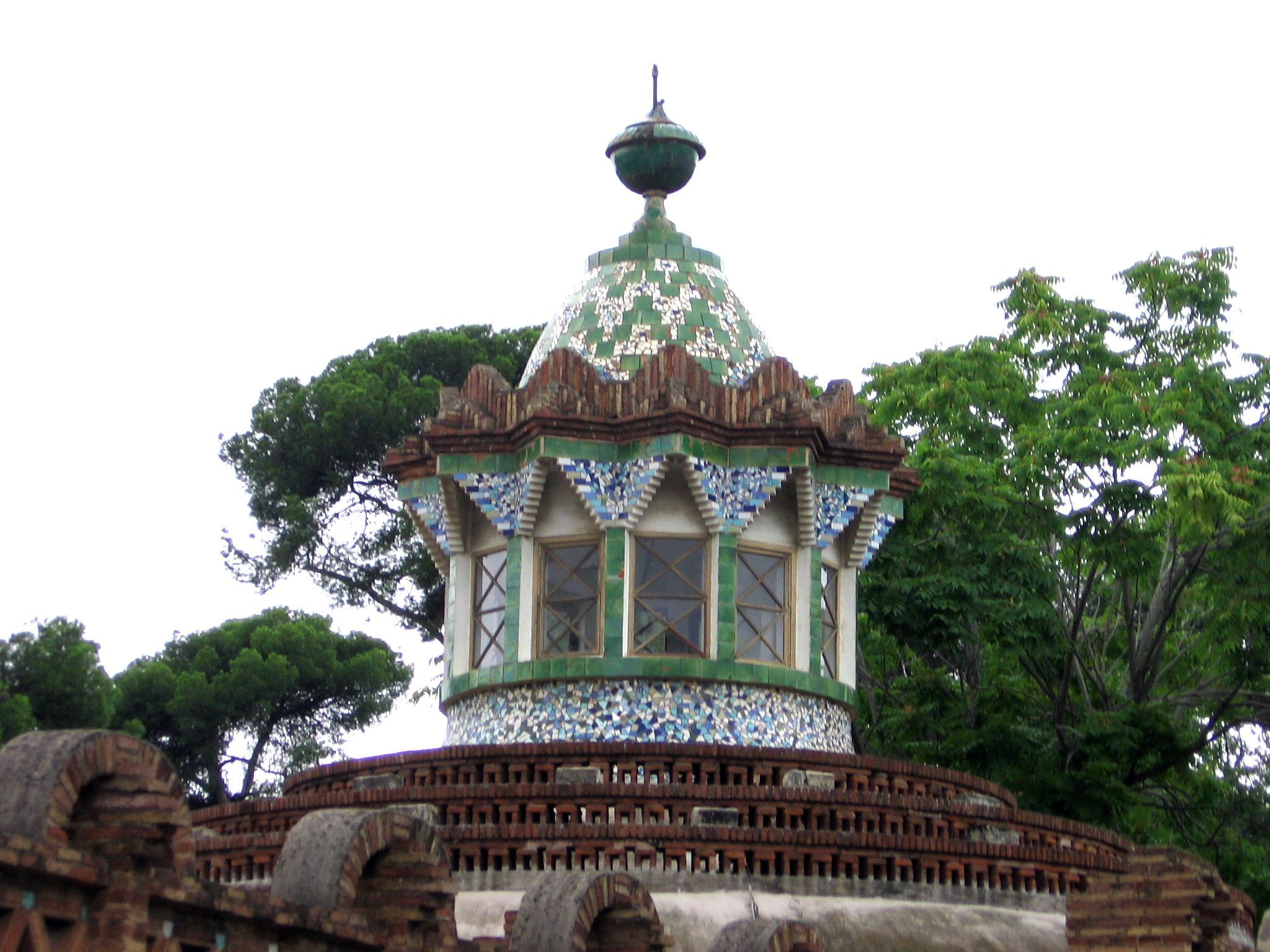
The dome of the longeing ring

The other three entrances to the estate became obsolete with the construction of Avinguda Diagonal: one of them still stands outside the cemetery of Les Corts, although its iron grille has been moved to the Gaudí Museum in the Parc Güell; another was restored in 1982 by the University of Barcelona and installed at the Institut de Geologia Francesc Almera; while the third was demolished to make way for the Pharmacy faculty, but rebuilt in 1957 adjacent to this building.

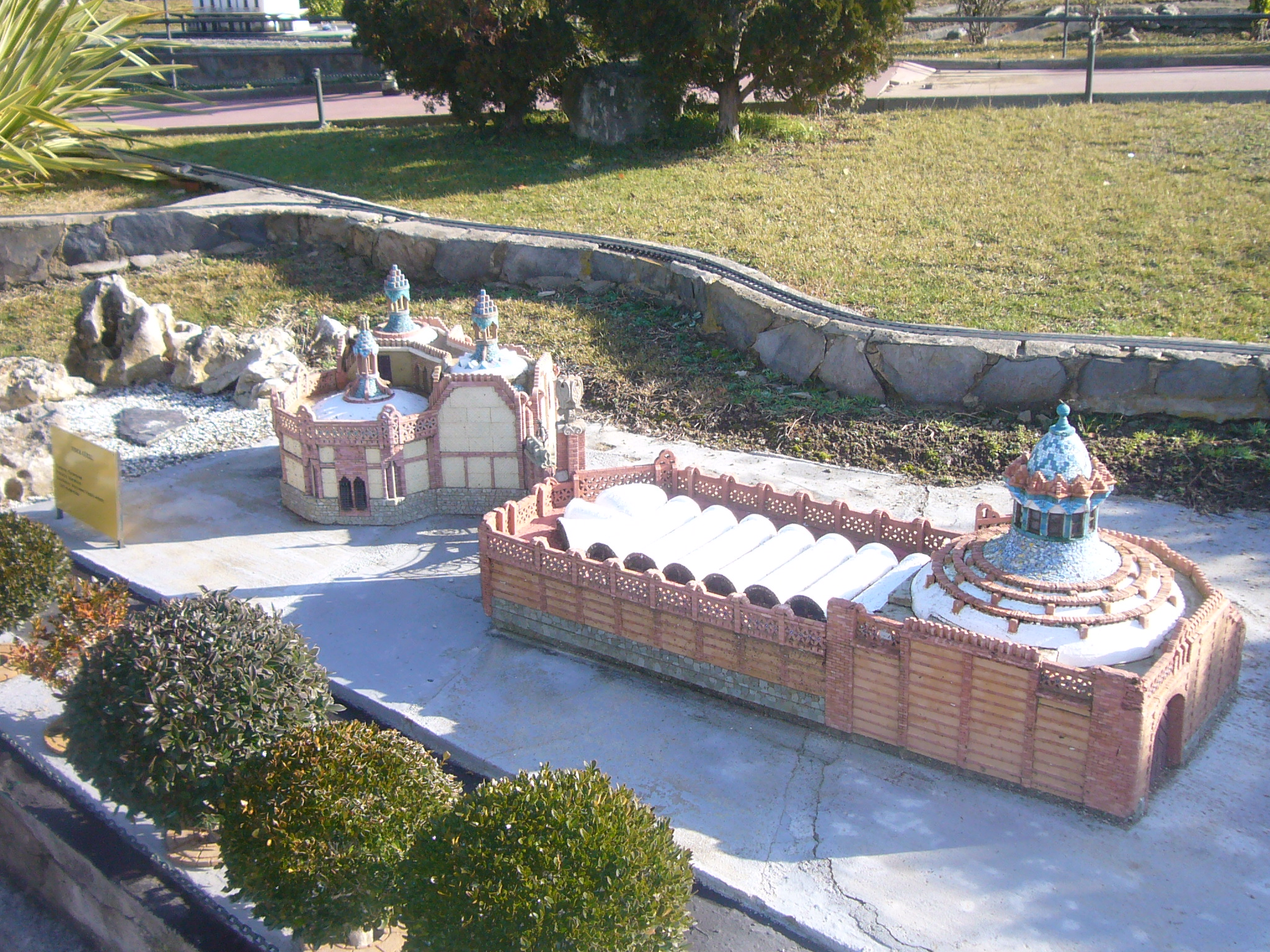
Model of the Pavilions at Catalunya en Miniatura

The Pavilions consist of a stable, longeing ring and gatehouses. The stable is rectangular and roofed with a high Catalan vault adopting a catenary curve; the longeing ring has a square ground-plan, but is surmounted by a hyperboloid dome topped by an ornamental lantern; the gatehouses consist of three small buildings, the central one being polygonal in plan and the others cuboidal. All three are surmounted by ventilators in the form of chimneys, faced with ceramics. All the buildings are built of brick in a range of shades from red to yellow, and covered in coloured glass; in certain sections prefabricated cement blocks are also used.

Gaudí was also partially responsible for the design of the estate's gardens, where he built two fountains and a pergola, and planted several Mediterranean species: (pines, eucalyptus, palms, cypresses and magnolias). The “Fountain of Hercules” still stands near the Palau Reial de Pedralbes, restored in 1983; it consists of a bust of Hercules surmounting a basin with the coat of arms of Catalonia and with a spout in the shape of a Chinese dragon.

In 1969 the Pavellons Güell were declared a Monument of National Historic and Artistic Interest. They are now used as the headquarters of the Royal Gaudí Chair, which pertains to the Universitat Politècnica de Catalunya, and the site also includes the Botanic Garden of Faculty of Biology.

== See also ==
- List of Gaudí buildings
- List of Modernista buildings in Barcelona

== Bibliography ==
- Joan Bassegoda i Nonell: El gran Gaudí, Ed. Ausa, Sabadell, 1989, ISBN 84-86329-44-2.
- Joan Bassegoda i Nonell: Gaudí o espacio, luz y equilibrio, Criterio, Madrid, 2002, ISBN 84-95437-10-4.
- Maria Antonietta Crippa: Gaudí, Taschen, Köln, 2007, ISBN 978-3-8228-2519-8.
