= Eusebi Güell =

Catalan textile magnate

- Eusebio Güell y Bacigalupi
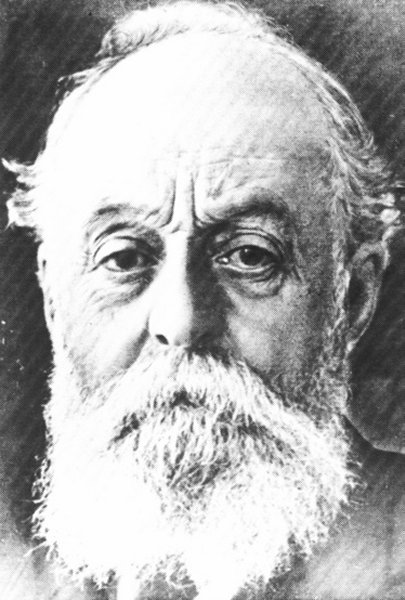
- Born: 15 December 1846; Barcelona
- Died: 8 July 1918; Barcelona
- Occupation: Businessperson
- Spouse: Isabel López y Bru
- Children: Juan Antonio, Isabel, and three others
- Parents: Joan Güell (father); Luisa López (mother)
- Awards: Grand Cross of the Order of Merit for Agriculture (1911)

Eusebi Güell Bacigalupi, 1st Count of Güell (Catalan pronunciation: [əwˈzɛβi ˈɣweʎ]; 15 December 1846 – 8 July 1918), also referred as Eusebio Güell, was a Spanish entrepreneur who profited greatly from the industrial revolution in Catalonia in the late 19th century.

== Biography ==
Güell was born in Barcelona in 1846 and was the son of Joan Güell Ferrer, a wealthy industrialist from Torredembarra who had amassed considerable riches during his stay in Cuba as a slave trader and thanks to the numerous activities established at his return in Barcelona. His mother, Francesca Bacigalupi Dolcer, was a member of an ancient merchant family from Genoa who had moved to Catalonia in the late 18th century.

He married Luisa Isabel López y Bru, daughter of Antonio López y López, Marquis of Comillas and notorious slave trader, in 1871. The couple had ten children. Güell took over his father's business, which was predominantly in textiles, and added to the family's wealth. After his wedding, he became one of Spain’s wealthiest men.

Güell met the young architect, Antoni Gaudí, following a visit to the World Fair held in Paris in 1878, where he had seen Gaudi's work at the Spanish Pavilion. The pair became lifelong friends and associates and found that they had mutual interests, including religion (both were devout Catholics). Güell became a patron to Gaudí. Their many collaborations began at the start of Gaudi's career, when Güell saw Gaudí as the man who could provide him with uniquely designed buildings.

Among Güell's early commissions for the aspiring architect were the Bodega Güell (winery) at Garraf, the Pabellones Güell de Pedralbes and Park Güell which was originally the Güell family home and only later bequeathed to the state.

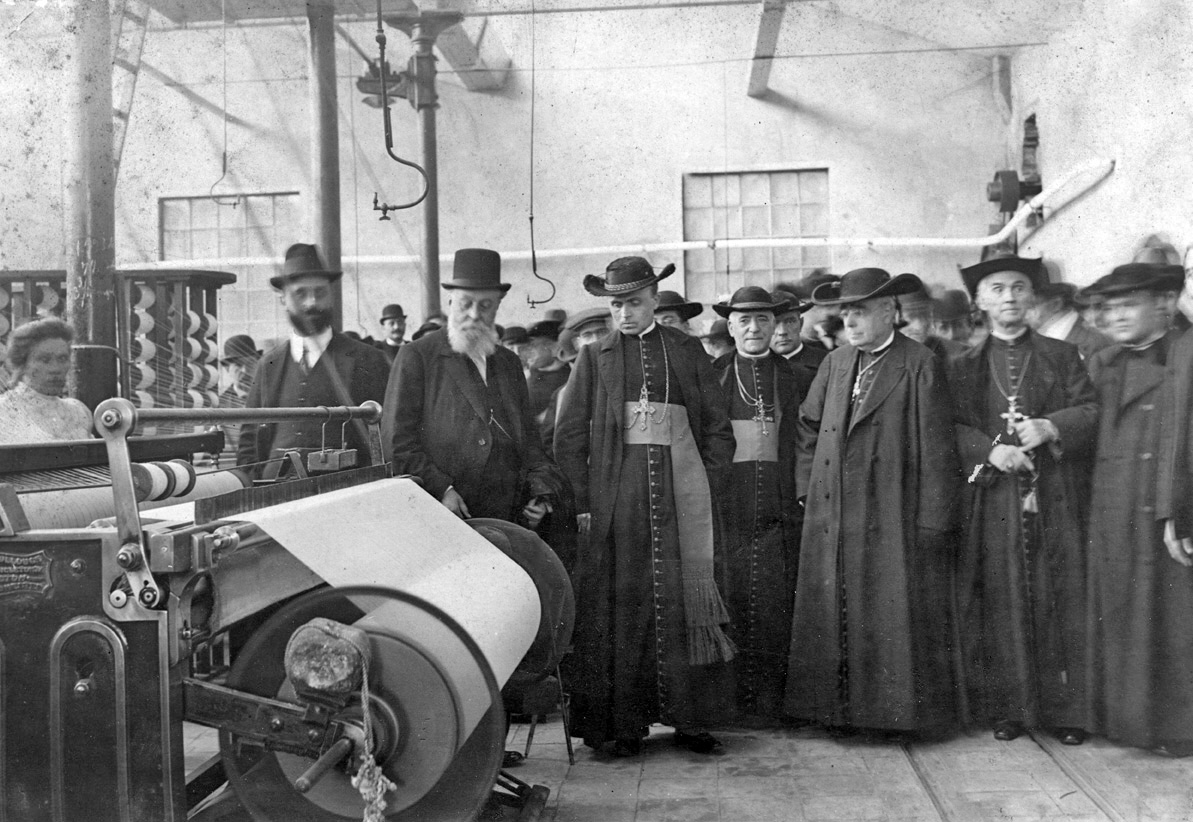
A visit to Colònia Güell in 1910 by the Bishops of Barcelona, Tarragona, Lleida, Vic and Valencia accompanied by Count Güell

In 1890, Güell moved his textile factory from Sants to Santa Coloma de Cervello, south of Barcelona. There he established a worker's colony along the lines of the British worker's colonies which had been built in the late nineteenth century. The colony or village at Santa Coloma, now known as Colonia Güell, was built with high socialist ideals; homes with larger than average rooms, wide windows and good ventilation so that the textile workers and their families could enjoy comfortable living conditions. The village was to be relatively self-contained and included shops, cafes, a theatre, library and a school (only for boys).

In 1890, Gaudi was commissioned to build a church and crypt on the hill overlooking the village. However, Güell ran into financial difficulties and the project was eventually abandoned. In spite of its unfinished status, the work is a masterpiece and demonstrates many of Gaudi's signature architectural devices including catenary arches and tessellated finishes. The village, which is still fully operational boasts many fine examples of modernist architecture. Reportedly on one occasion Gaudí said to Güell, "Sometimes I think we are the only people who like this architecture." Güell replied, "I don't like your architecture, I respect it."

In 1900, Güell bought land in Gracia, Barcelona and employed Gaudí to build an estate for the rich. At that time, the area was considered to be remote and the project failed to realize commercial success. Only two houses were built. In 1923, the Güell family gave the land to the city, as Park Güell.

King Alfonso XIII ennobled Eusebi Güell as count in 1908. He died in 1918 in his house of Park Güell.

== Patronage ==
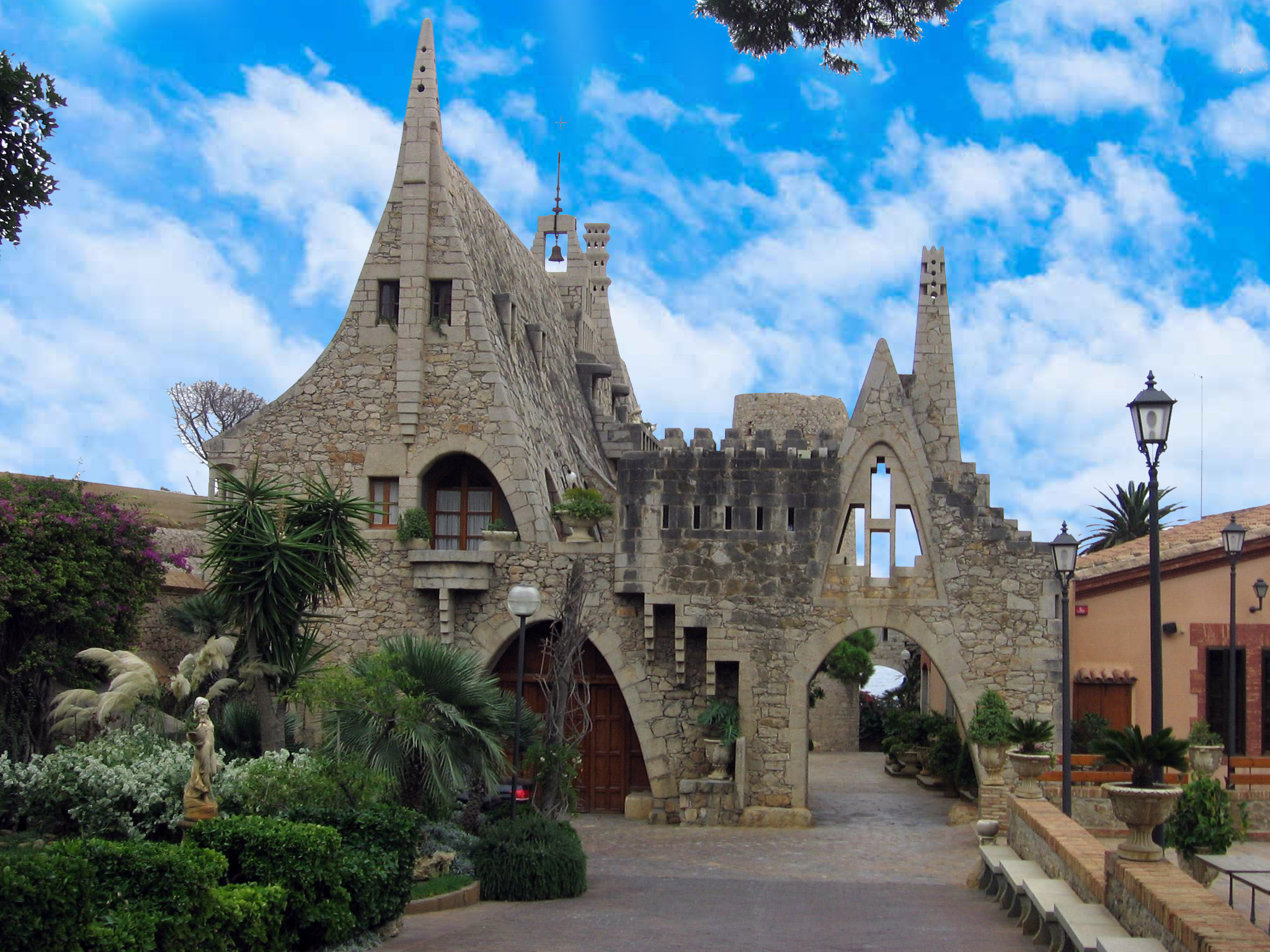
Bodegas Güell in Sitges

Buildings by Gaudí that bear Güell's name include:

- Palau Güell
- Colònia Güell (at Santa Coloma de Cervello)
- Park Güell
- Bodegas Güell (at Garraf, near Sitges)
- Pabellones Güell de Pedrables

== Bibliography ==
- Faes Díaz, Enrique (2009). Claudio López Bru, marqués de Comillas (in Spanish). Madrid: Marcial Pons Ediciones de Historia. ISBN 9788492820061.
- Kliczkowski, H. (2004). Barcelona y Gaudi. La Ruta Del Modernismo. HK Books. ISBN 9788496241138.
- McKenney, Kenneth (2005). In the Land of the Marquis. An English Family in Northern Spain. iUniverse. ISBN 9780595362189.
- Smith, Angel (2017). Historical Dictionary of Spain. Rowman & Littlefield Publishers. ISBN 9781538108833.
- Shubert, Adrian (1991). Historia social de España (1800-1990) (in Spanish). Nerea. ISBN 9788486763473.
