= Park Güell =

Public park system in Barcelona, Spain

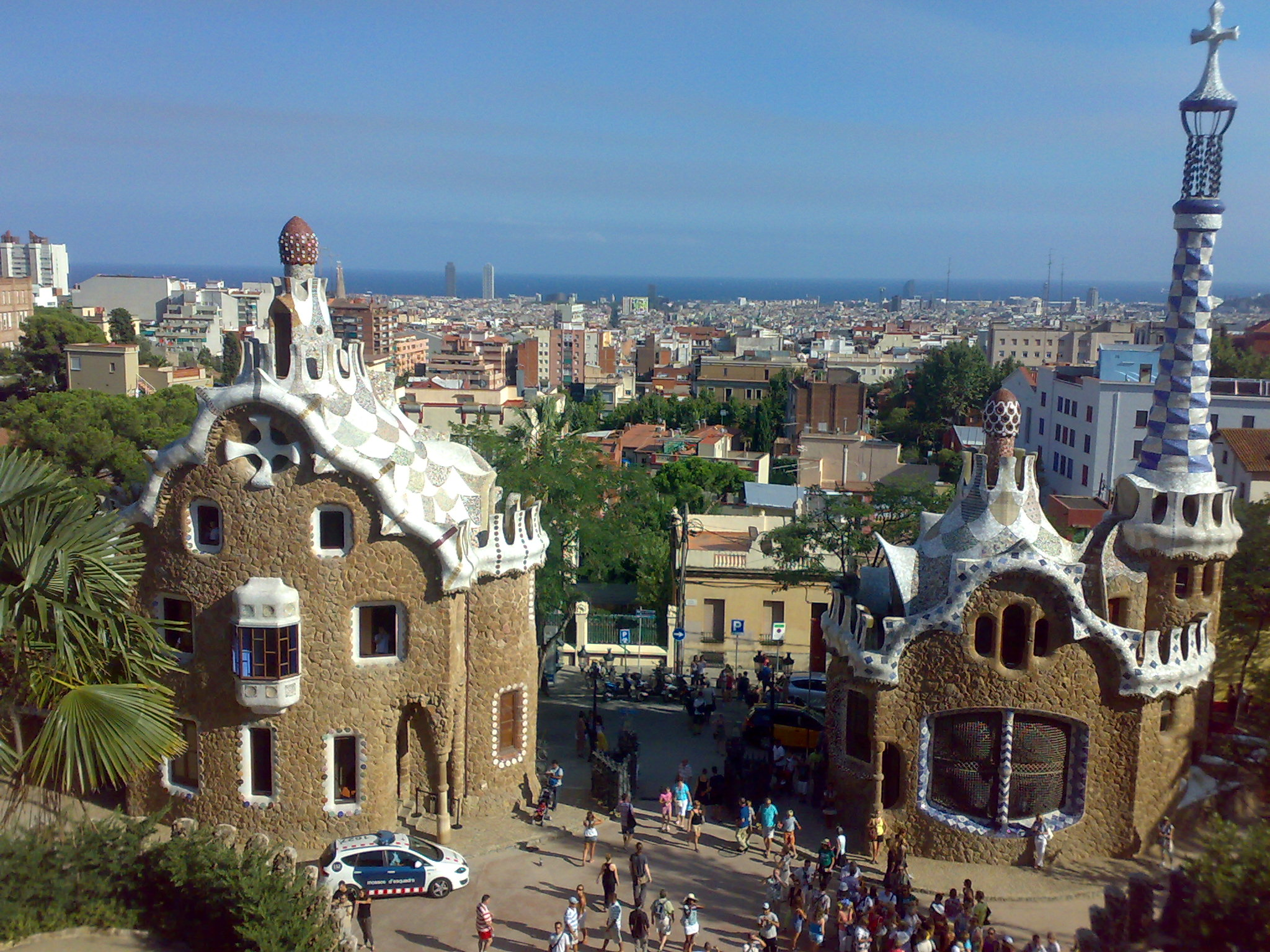
- The two buildings at the entrance of the park
- Interactive map of Park Güell
- Location: Barcelona, Spain
- Coordinates: 41°24′49″N 2°09′10″E
- Established: 1914

UNESCO World Heritage Site
- Part of: Works of Antoni Gaudí
- Criteria: (i), (ii), (iv)
- Reference: 320-001
- Inscription: 1984 (8th Session)
- Extensions: 2005

Spanish Cultural Heritage
- Type: Non-movable
- Criteria: Monument
- Designated: 24 July 1969
- Reference no.: RI-51-0003818

Park Güell (Catalan: Parc Güell [ˈpaɾɡ ˈɡweʎ]; Spanish: Parque Güell) is a complex of parks and gardens in Barcelona with architectural elements, located in the La Salut neighborhood of the Gràcia district in Barcelona, Catalonia, Spain. It is situated on the southern slope of the Turó del Carmel hill, part of the Collserola mountain range, overlooking the city. The separate Parc del Carmel lies on the northern side of the same hill.

In the context of Barcelona's late 19th and early 20th-century urban expansion, Catalan industrialist and art patron Eusebi Güell commissioned architect Antoni Gaudí, a leading figure of the aesthetic movement in Catalan modernism, to design a park.

Construction took place between 1900 and 1914, and the park officially opened to the public in 1926. In 1984, UNESCO designated the park a World Heritage Site, recognizing it as part of the "Works of Antoni Gaudí" collection and stating "the architecture of the park combined elements from the Arts and Crafts movement, Symbolism, Expressionism, and Rationalism, and presaged and influenced many forms and techniques of 20th-century Modernism."

== Description ==
Park Güell reflects Gaudí's distinctive artistic sensibilities and visual language, marking a specific phase in his development—his naturalist period in the first decade of the 20th century. During this time, Gaudí’s study of nature and organic forms led to innovative structural solutions based on geometric analysis.

These geometric insights gave rise to his imaginative and ornamental style. Rooted in Baroque, Gaudí’s work exhibits structural richness and freedom from the rigidity of classical norms. In Park Güell, he introduced curved and undulating benches—a precursor to the style fully realized in the Sagrada Família.

Originally, Güell and Gaudí envisioned the site as a private residential development of luxurious homes with modern amenities. The park's common spaces—stairways, terraces, gardens—were designed to embody the political and religious ideals of its creators. Symbolic references include political Catalanism (e.g., on the entrance stairway), and Catholicism (e.g., the Monumento al Calvario, initially conceived as a chapel). Classical elements and Greek mythology references are also present.

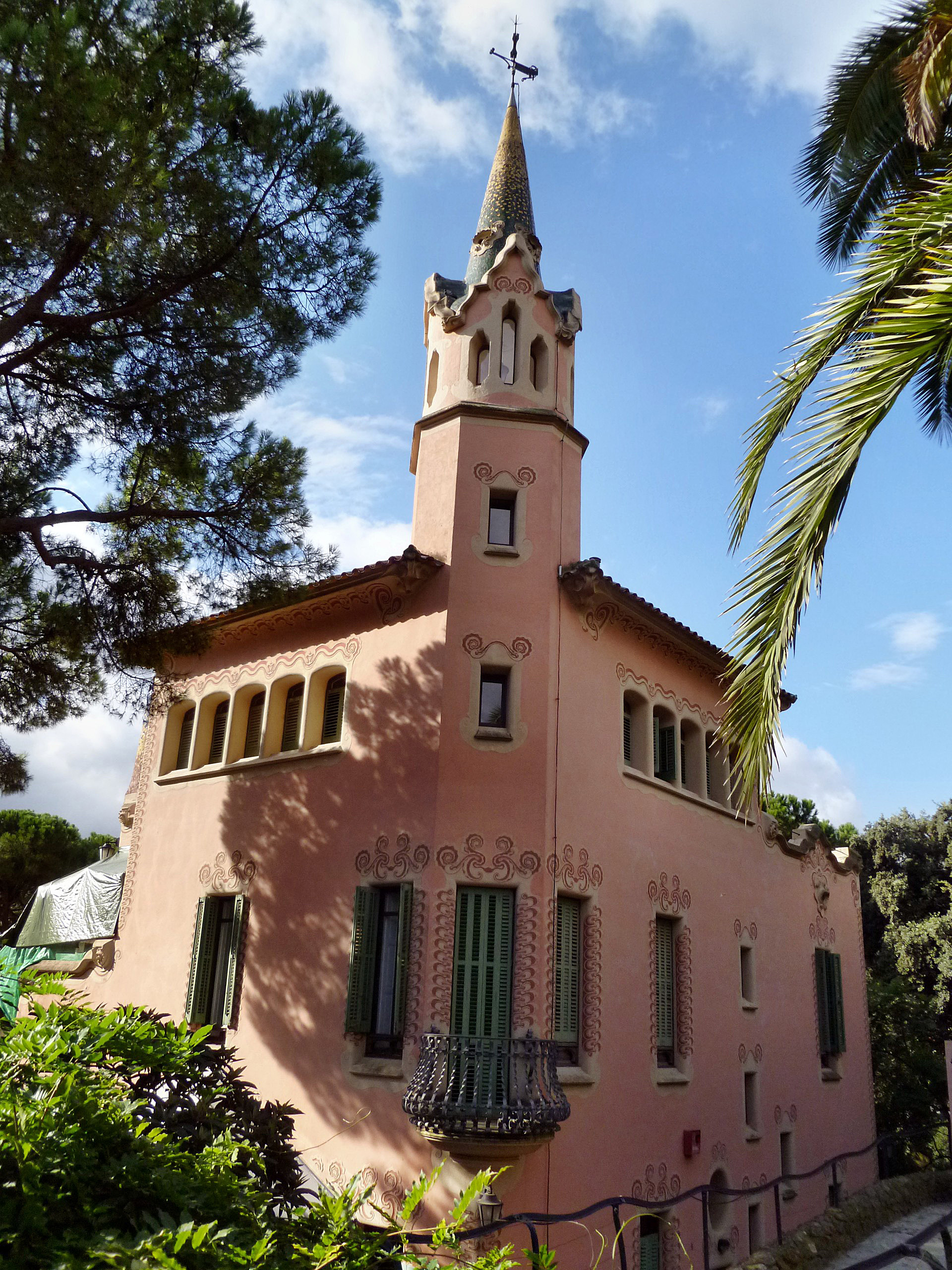
The Gaudí House Museum

== Origins as a residential development ==
Count Eusebi Güell had originally planned to establish a high-end residential development for the bourgeoisie, inspired by the English garden city movement. The name "Park" reflects this English influence. The location, a rocky hill called Muntanya Pelada (Bare Mountain), contained a large house known as Larrard House. Bordering the upscale La Salut neighborhood, Güell sought to market the area for its clean air and views. The plan included sixty triangular plots for luxury homes. Güell moved into Larrard House in 1906 to promote the project, but only two homes were built (neither by Gaudí) as the sparsely developed area was found to be too far from the city centre.

One house, built as a show home in 1904, remained unsold. Güell persuaded Gaudí to purchase it with his savings. Gaudí moved in with his father and niece in 1906. The house, designed by Francesc Berenguer i Mestres, became the Gaudí House Museum in 1963 and was declared a national monument in 1969.

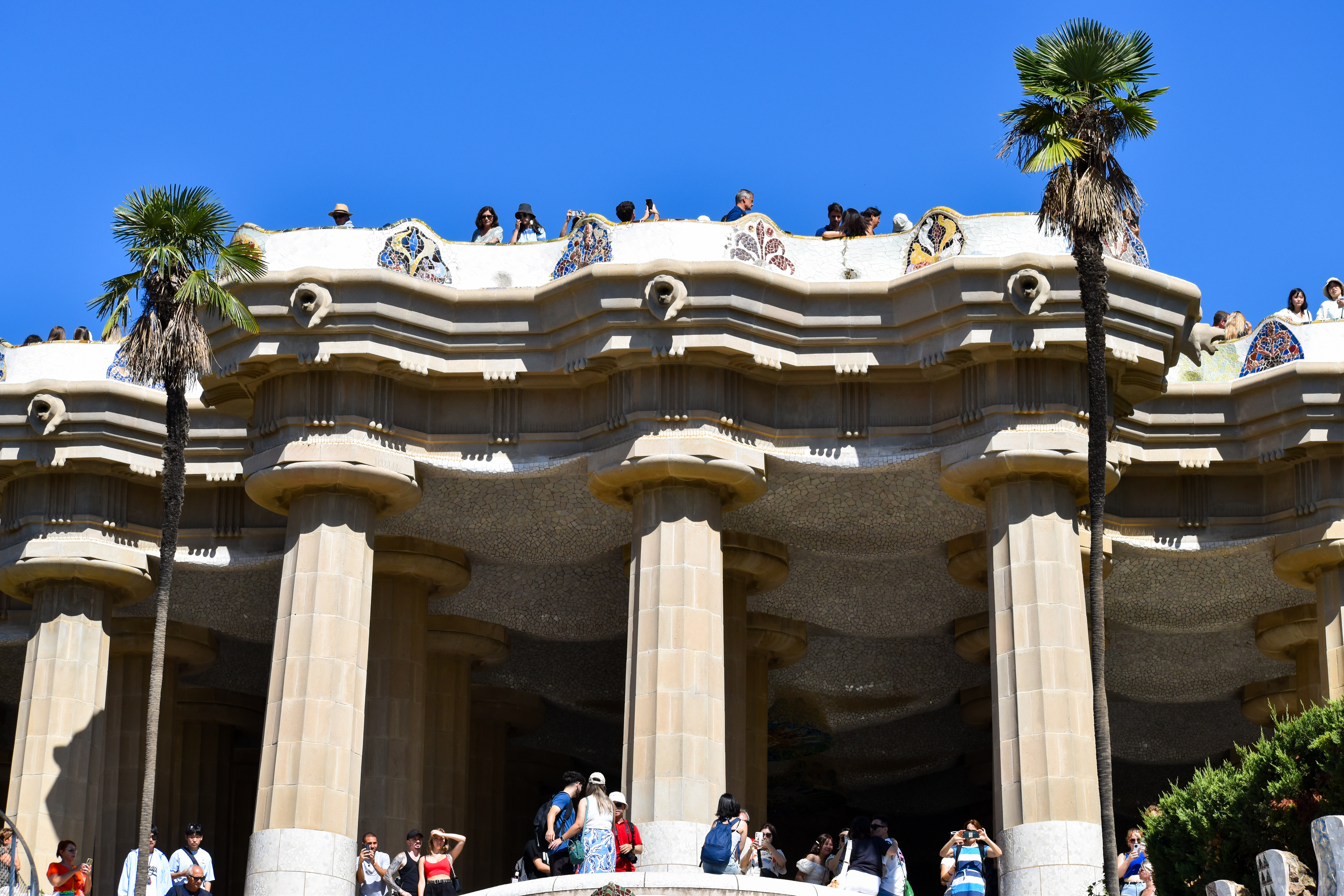
Main terrace

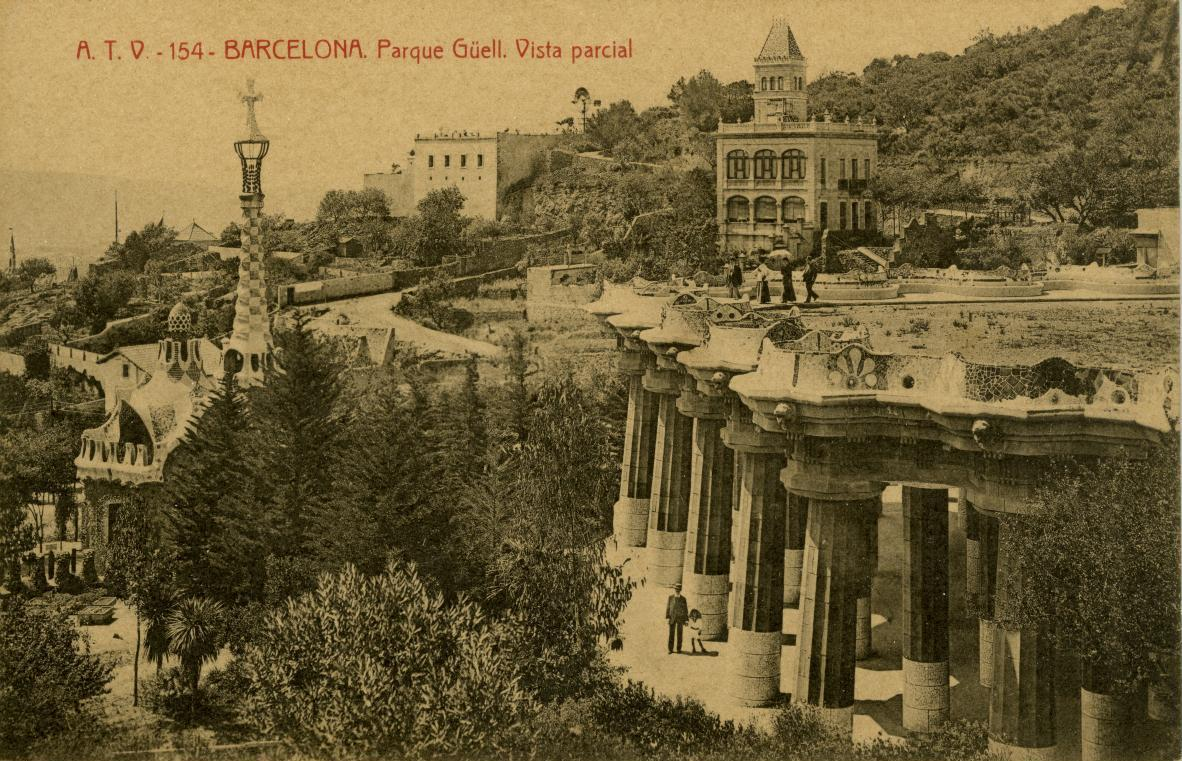
Partial view of the park after it was established in 1916

== Municipal garden ==
Park Güell eventually became a municipal garden. It is reachable by the Barcelona Metro, with Vallcarca and Lesseps being closest but not adjacent. Buses and tour buses also serve the park. Since October 2013, entry to the Monumental Zone (main terrace, mosaics, viaducts, and gate area) requires a ticket, while Barcelona residents enter for free. Tickets often sell out. Entry to Gaudí’s house (La Torre Rosa) is separate, with a discount available for visitors of the Sagrada Família.

The entrance is marked by two whimsical gatehouses forming the Porter's Lodge pavilion. One housed a phone booth; the other now contains a permanent exhibit of the Barcelona City History Museum.

The park's focal point is a terrace bordered by a long, curving bench shaped like a sea serpent. Designed by Josep Maria Jujol, the bench’s ergonomic form creates enclaves to encourage social interaction. The terrace is supported by a series of columns forming a vaulted space decorated with mosaics that recall grotesque motifs inspired by Roman architecture, particularly the Domus Aurea.

A system of elevated pathways—originally intended for carriages—threads through the park. Designed by Gaudí using local stone, they blend seamlessly with the landscape. Their columns and vaulted supports mimic tree trunks and natural forms. As with his earlier work at Colònia Güell, Gaudí used inverted catenary arches to achieve optimal load-bearing compression.

At the park’s highest point is a hill with steps leading to El Turó de les Tres Creus (Hill of the Three Crosses)—a calvary of three stone crosses. One points skyward; the other two mark cardinal directions. From here, visitors can view the Sagrada Família, Torre Glòries, Montjuïc, and the Mediterranean.

Park Güell supports a diverse range of wildlife, including non-native parrots and sightings of the short-toed eagle. It is also known for hummingbird hawk moths.

== Gallery of images ==
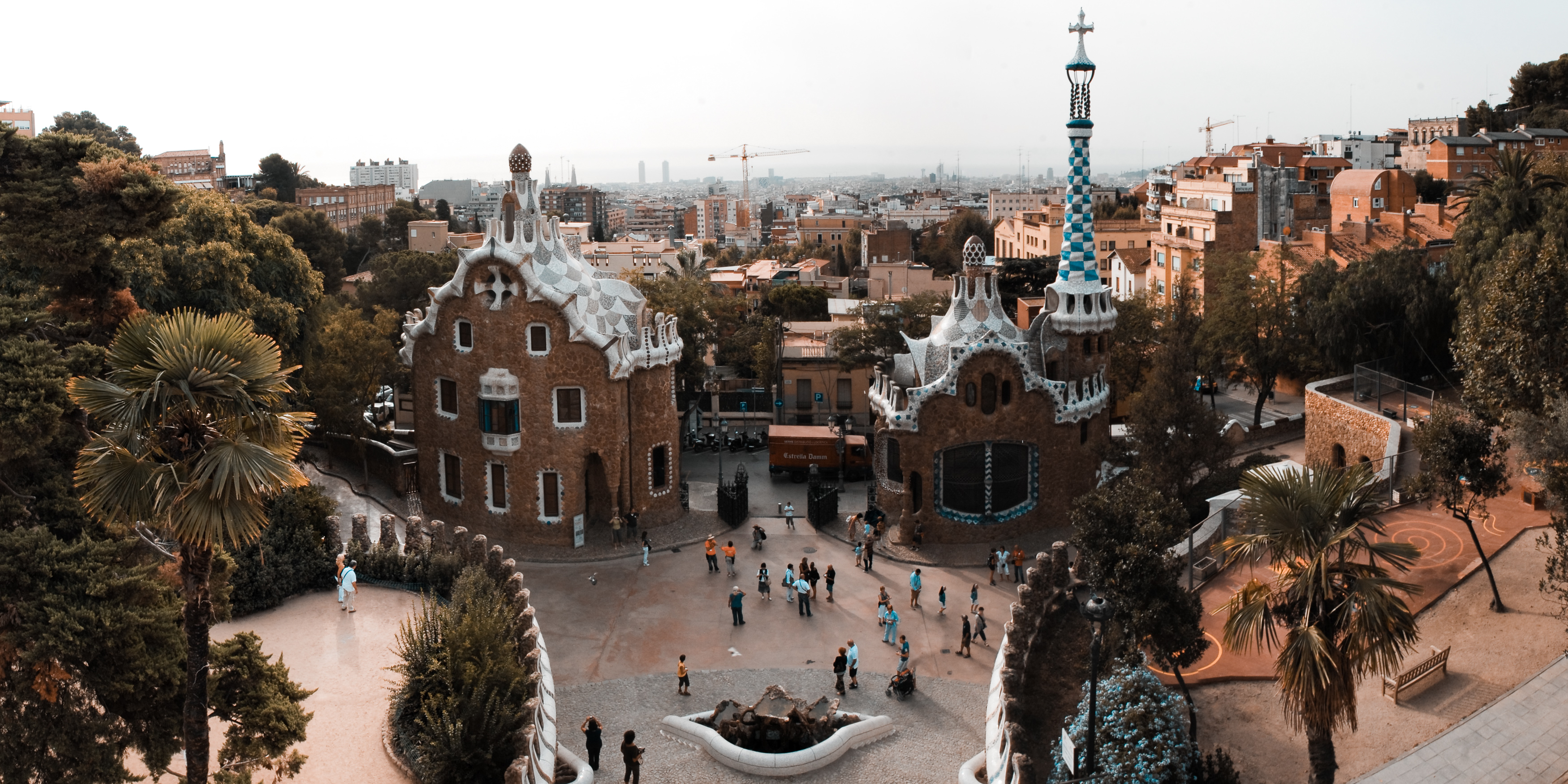
Panoramic entrance view

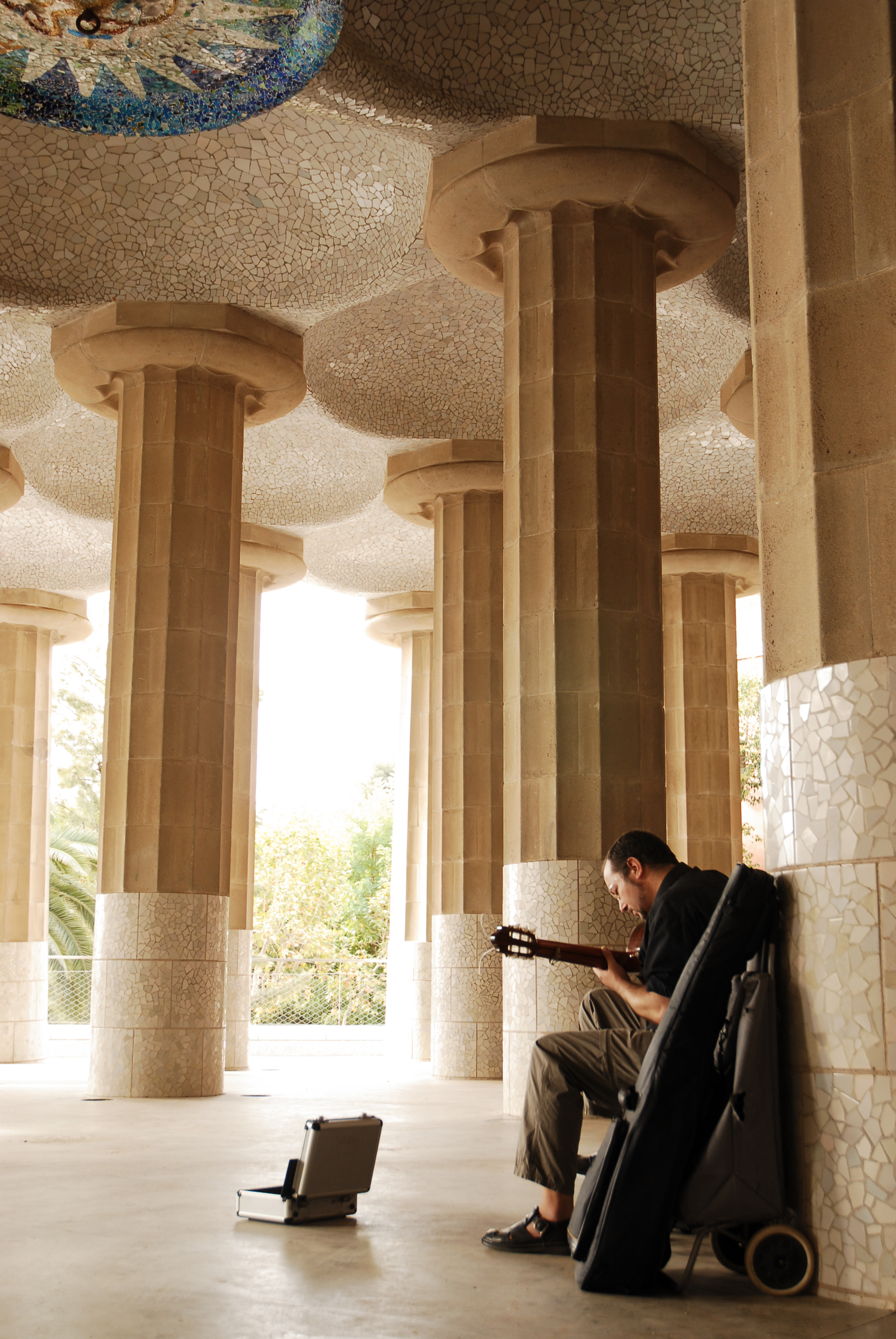
Music performance in the Sala Hipóstila

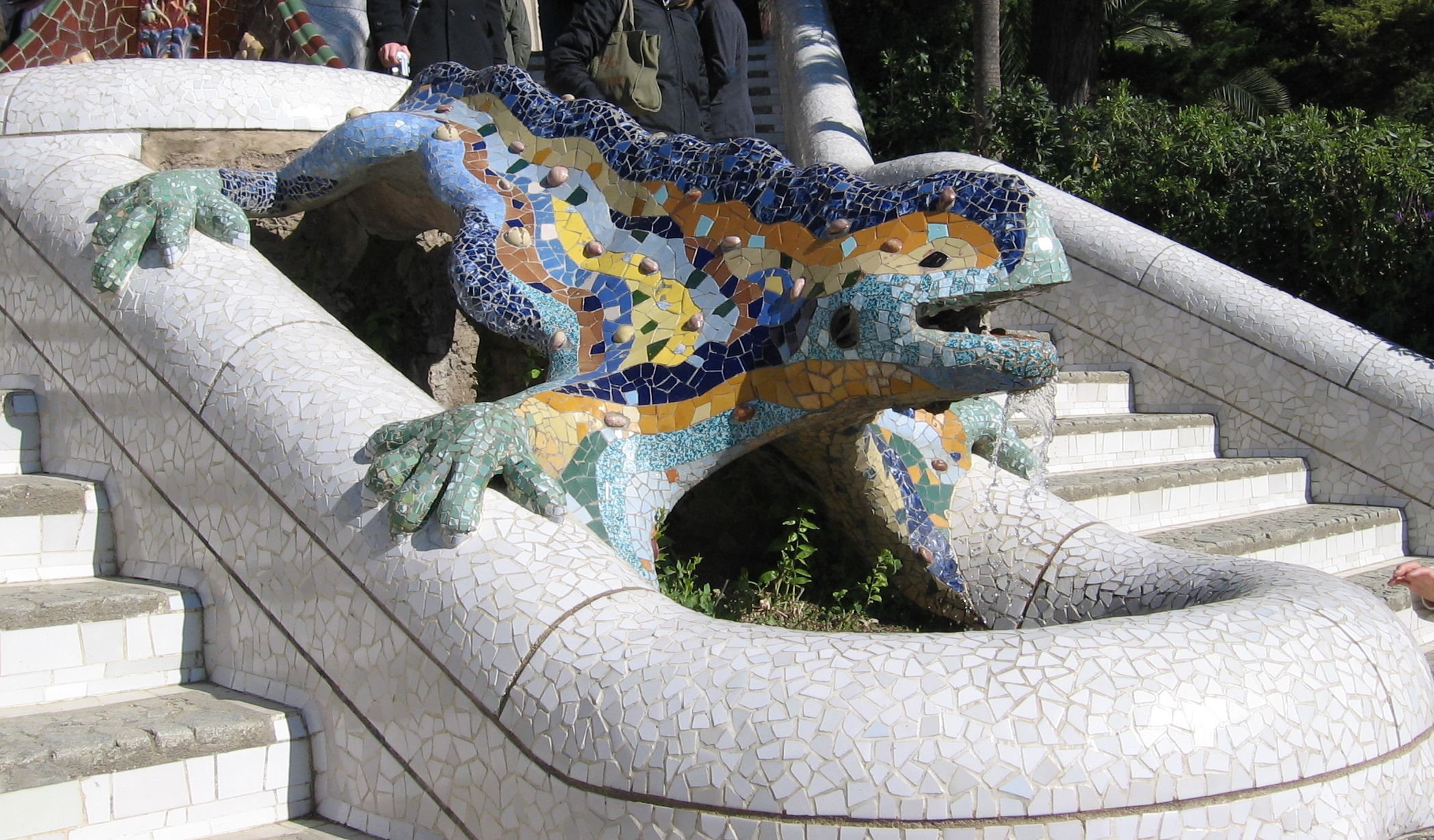
Gaudí's multicolored mosaic salamander, popularly known as El Drac ("the dragon"), after its 2007 restoration

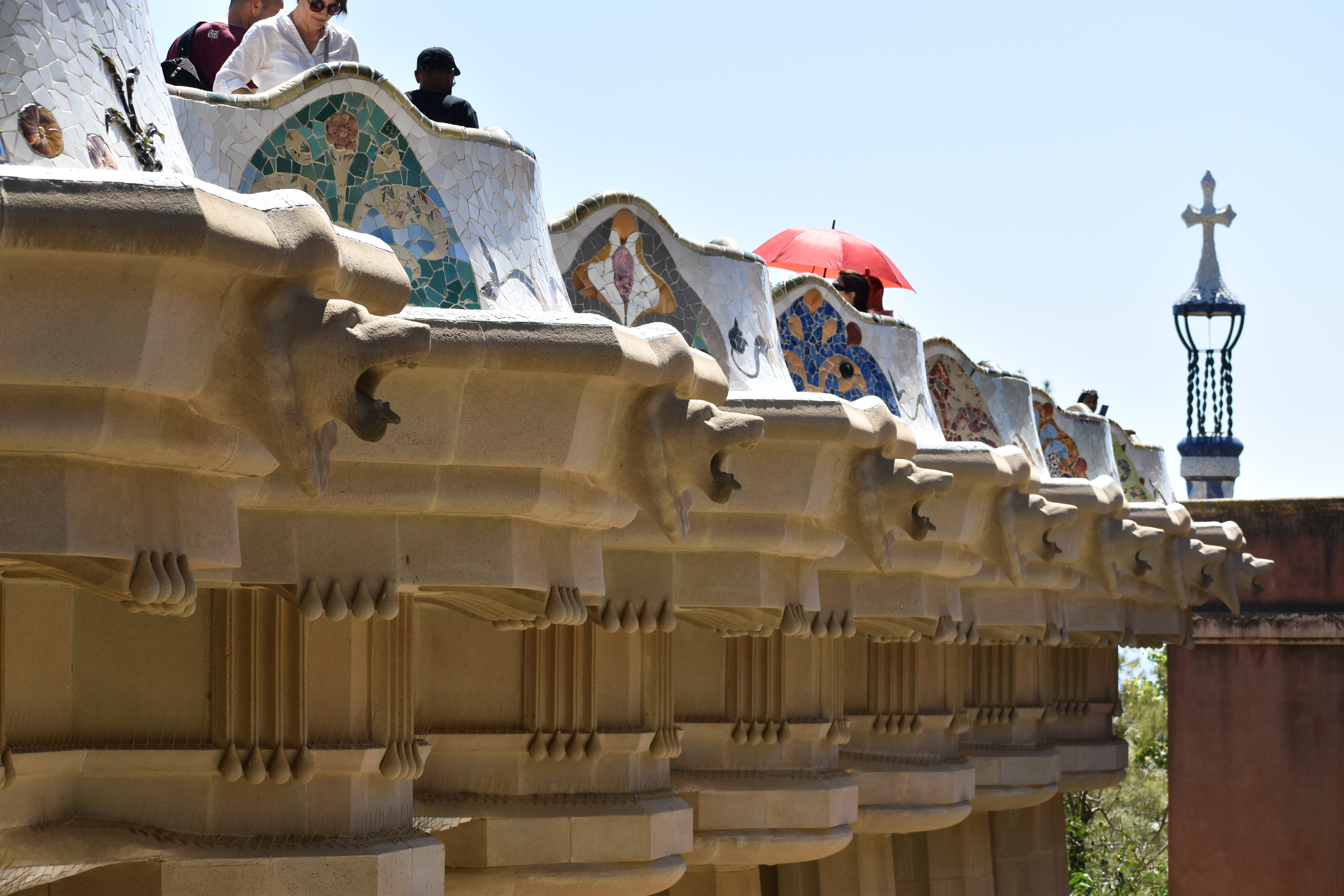
Balustrade of the terrace

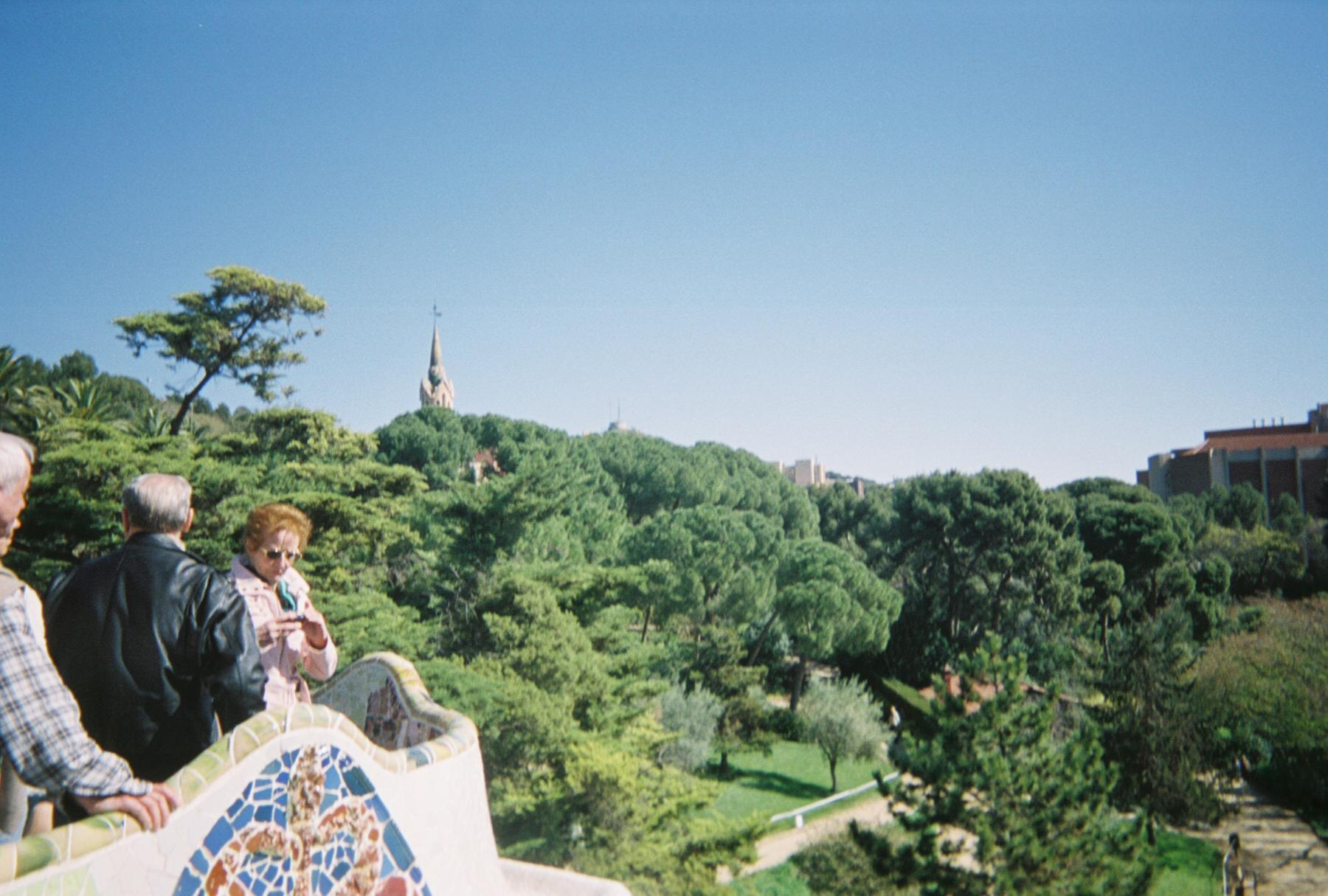
View from the main terrace

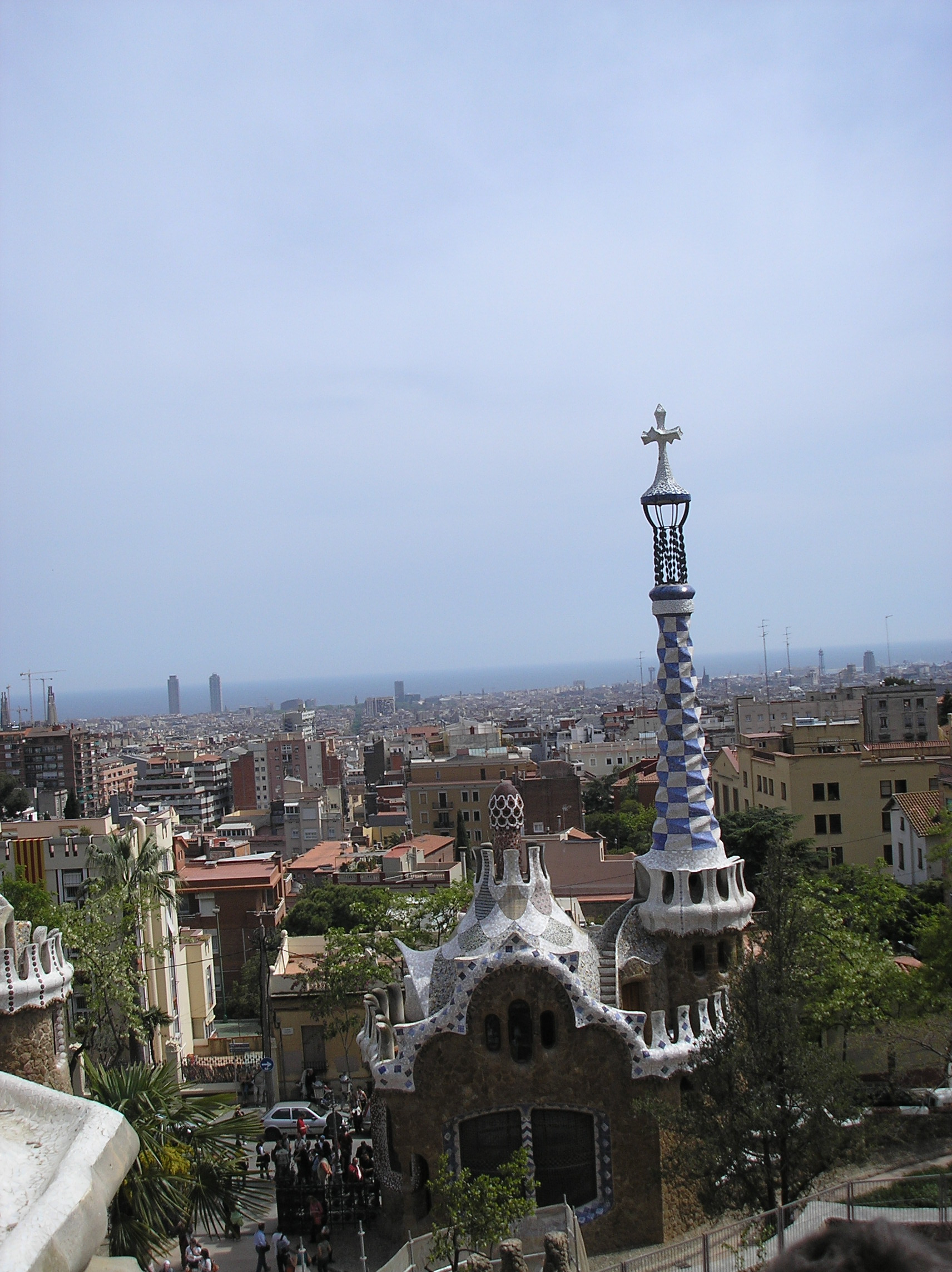
Entrance to the Park

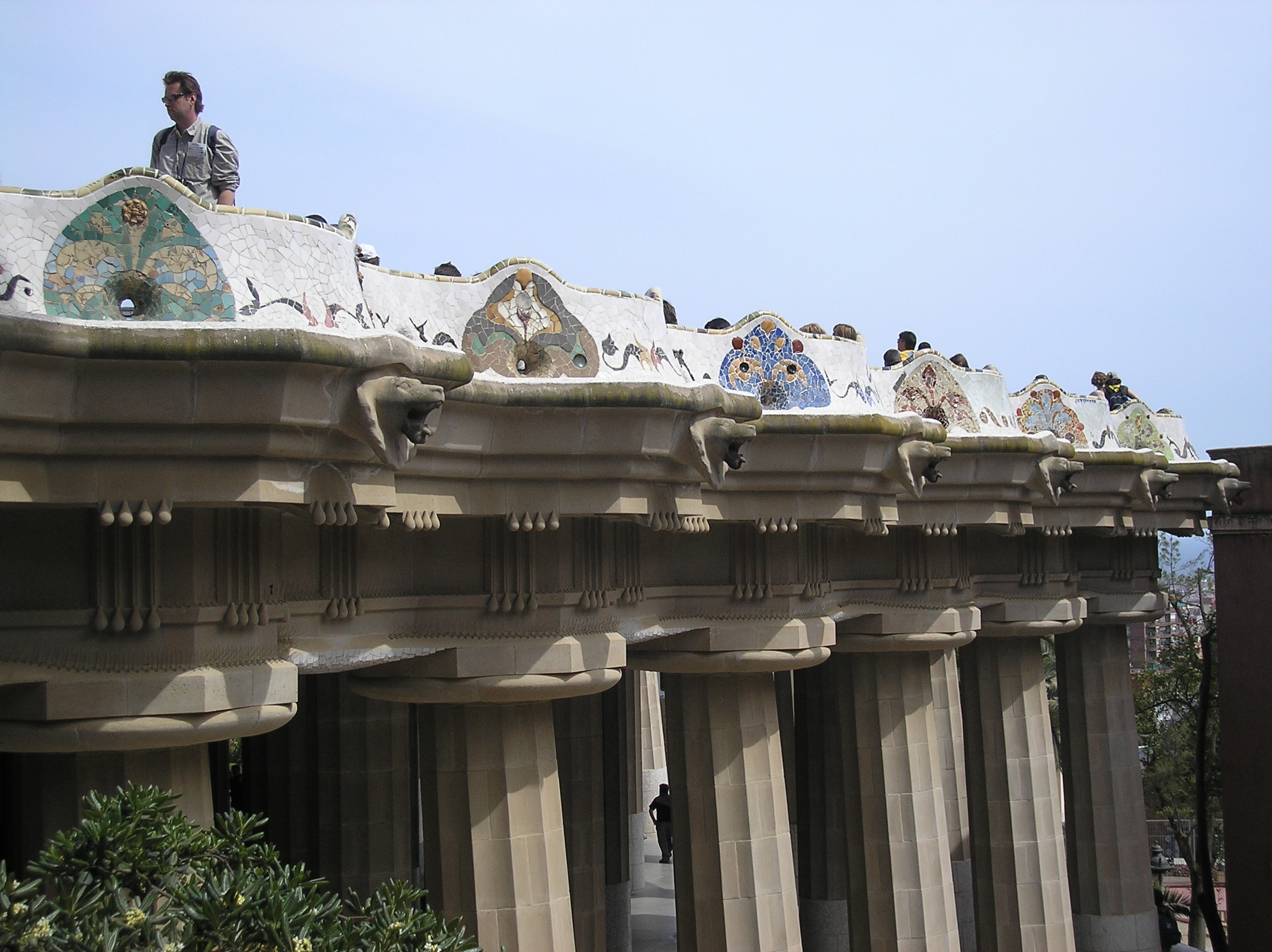
Doric columns supporting the terrace

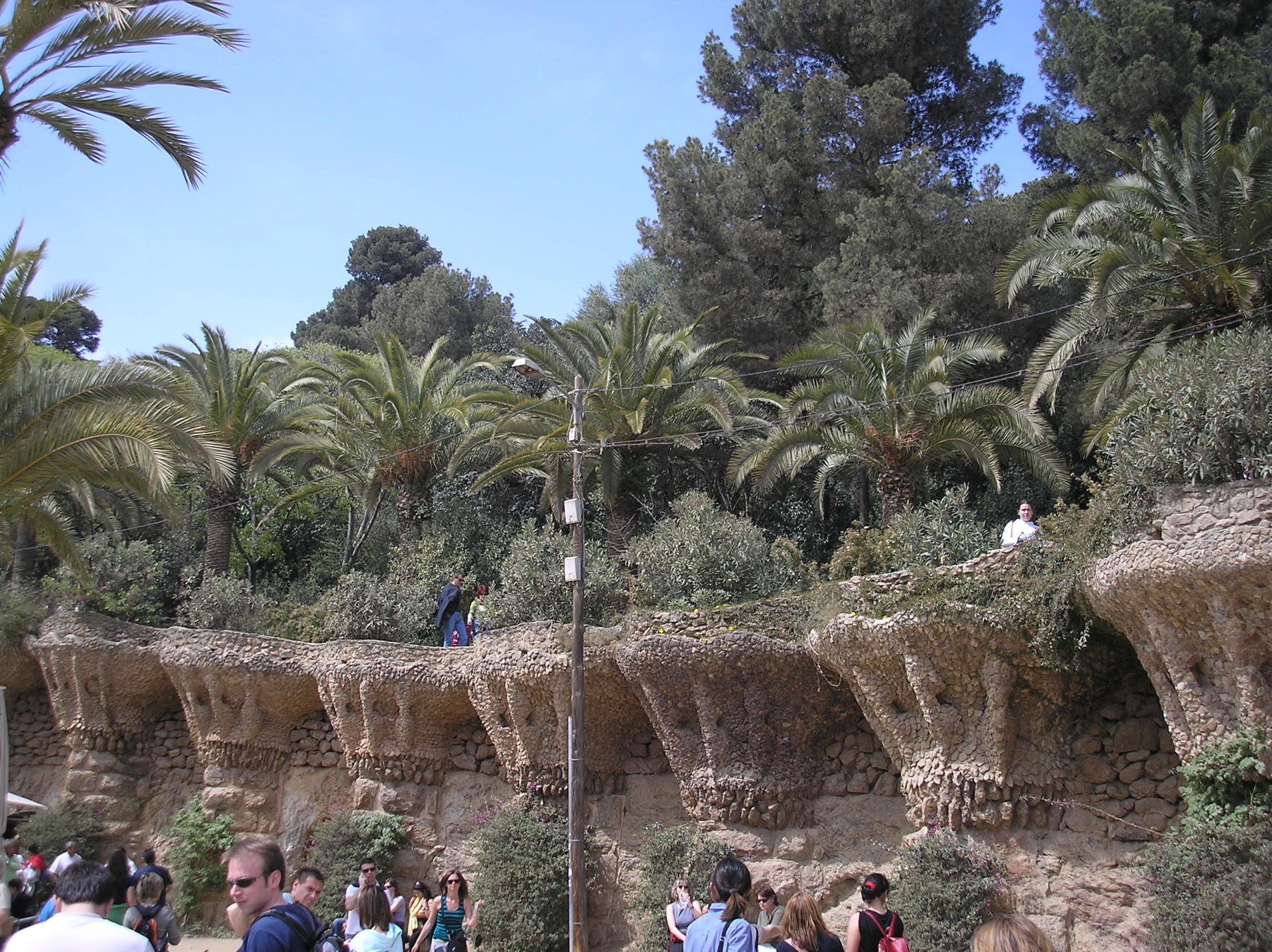
Bird nests integrated into the walls

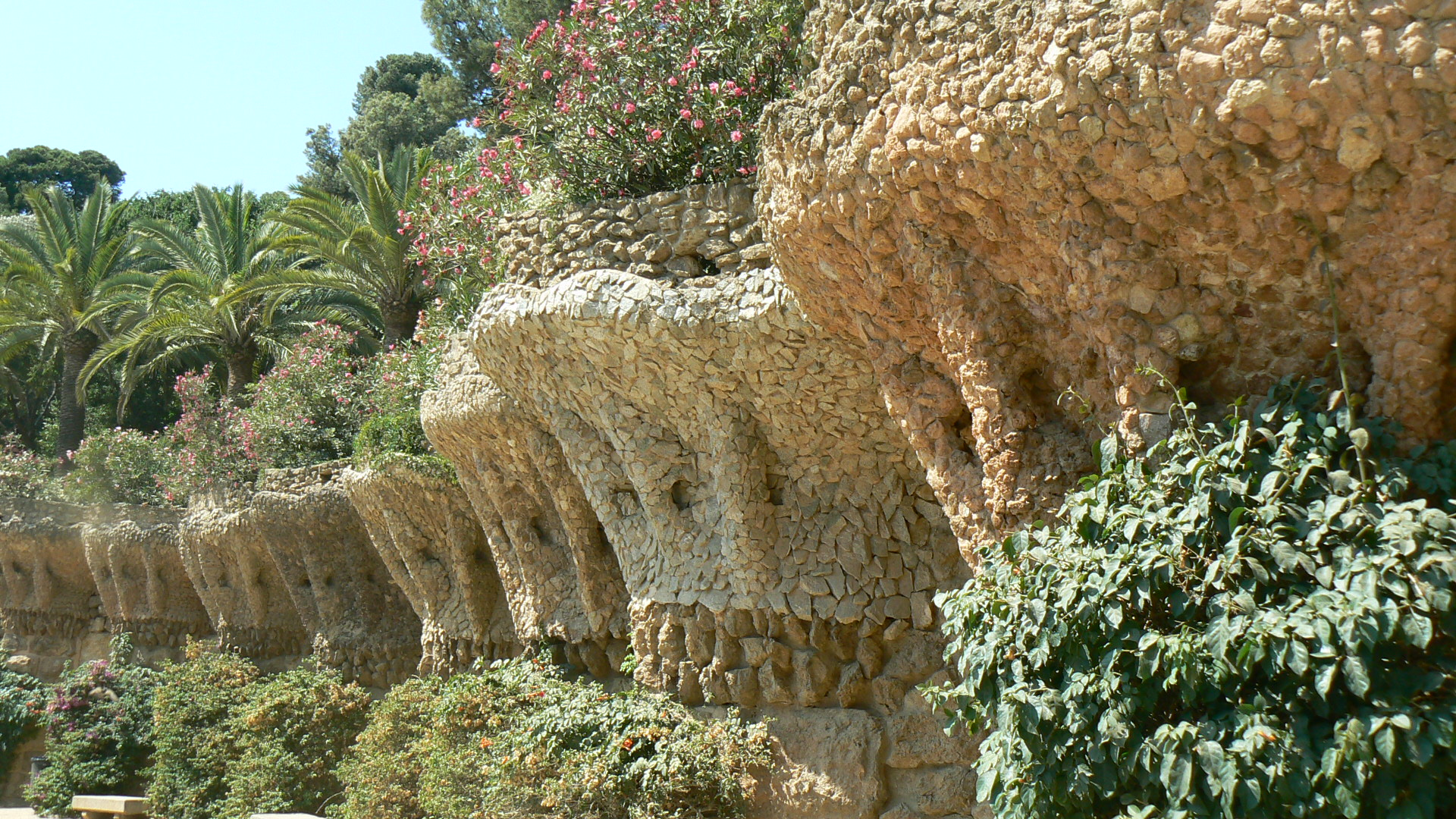
Terrace retaining walls

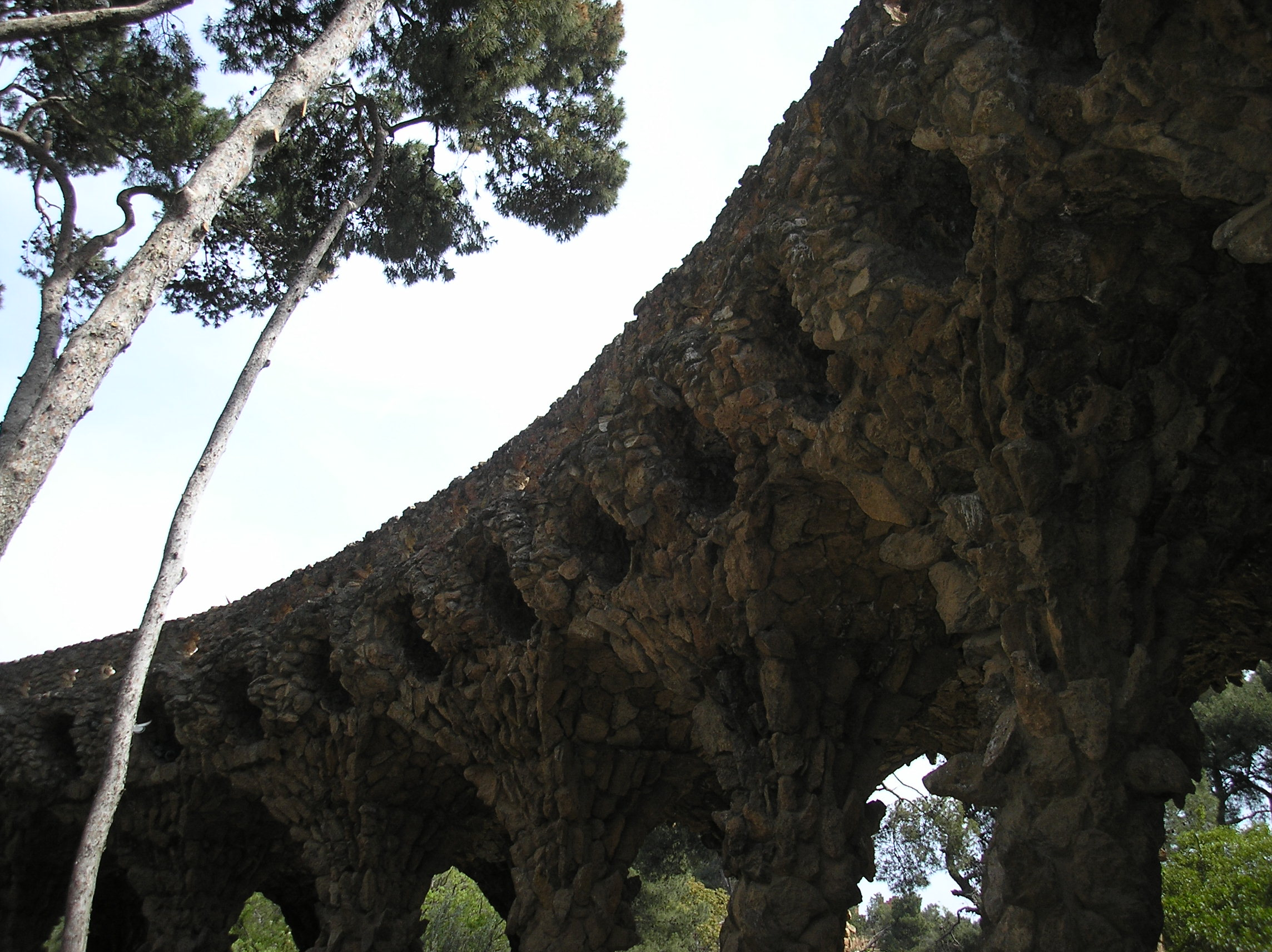
Stone arcades mimicking pine trees

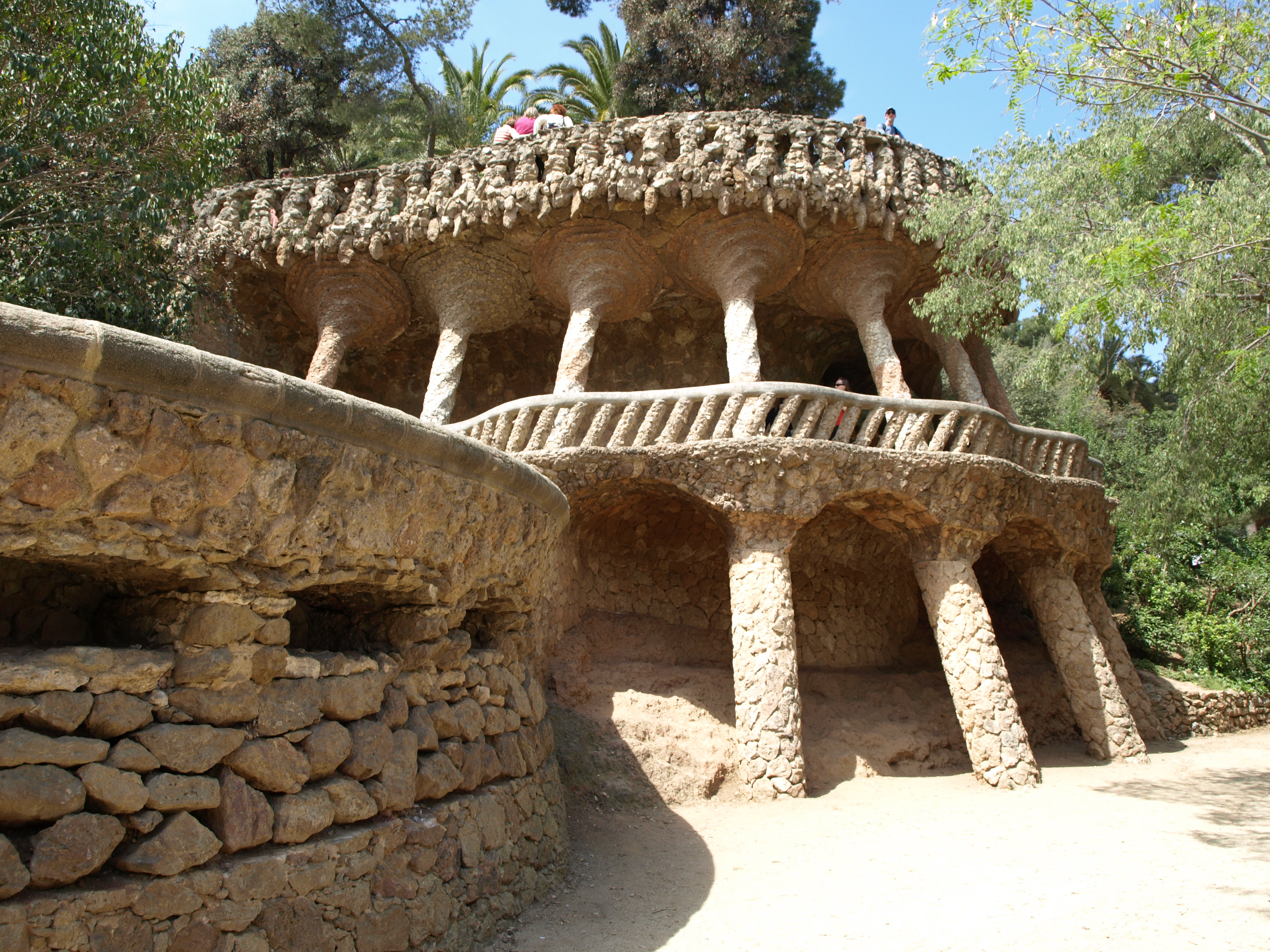
Viaduct designed for carriage transport

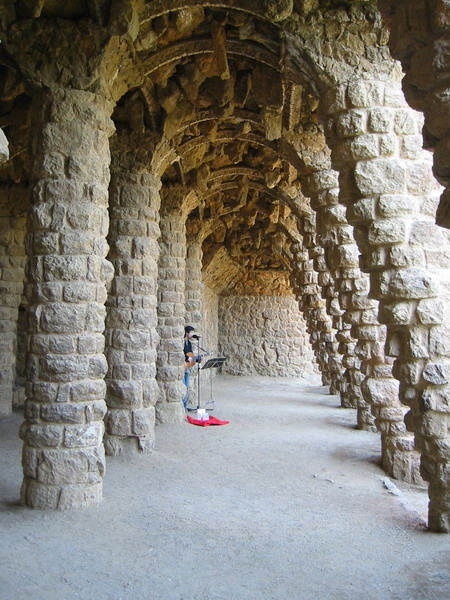
Colonnaded footpath under a viaduct

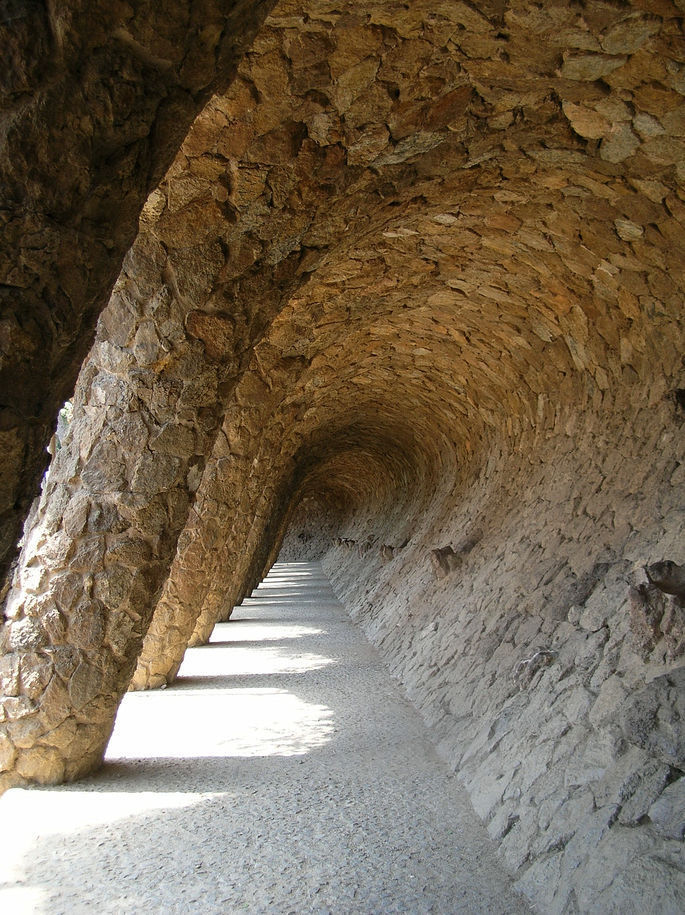
Vaulted retaining wall beneath the road

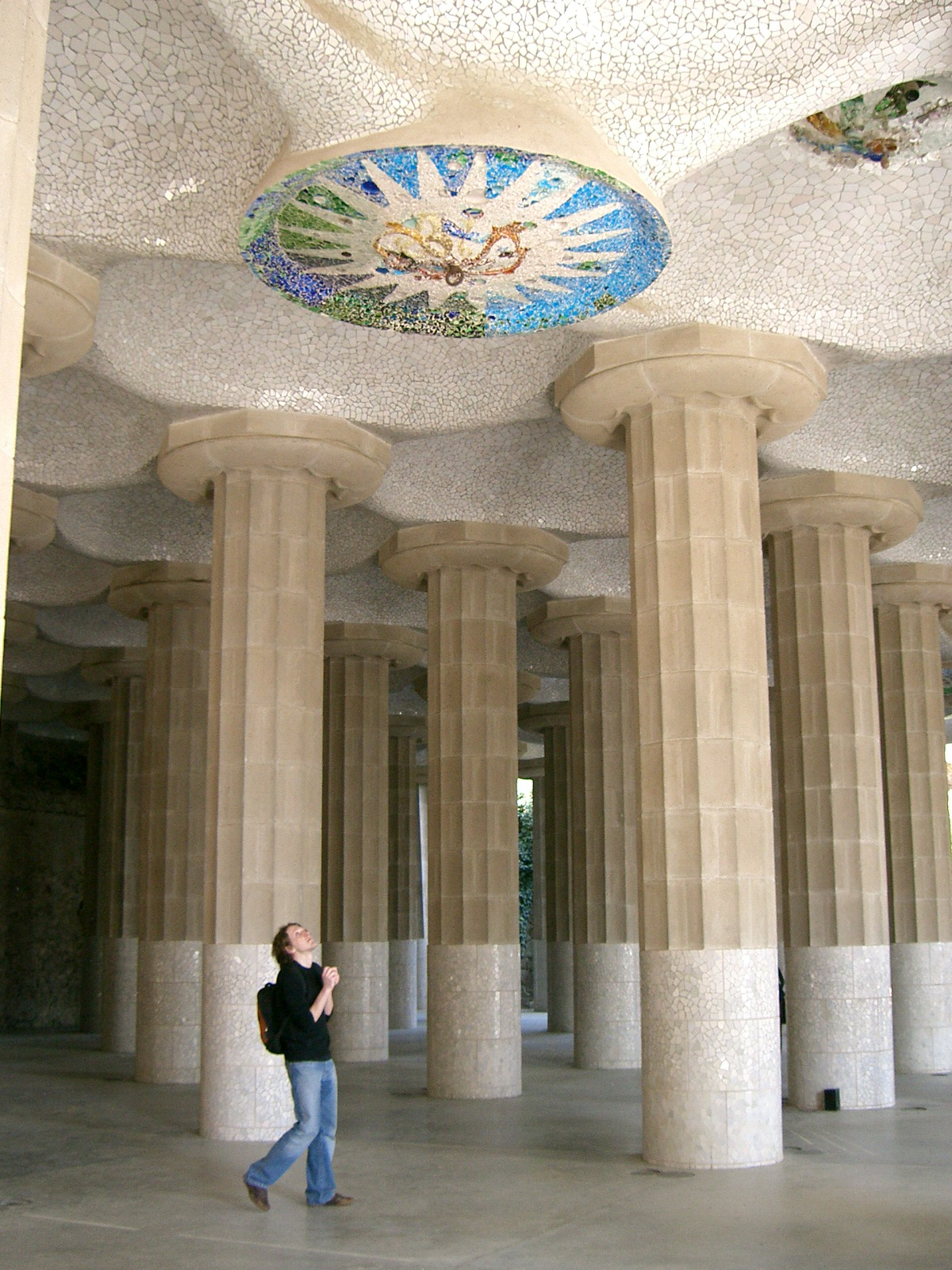
Tiled mosaic on the ceiling

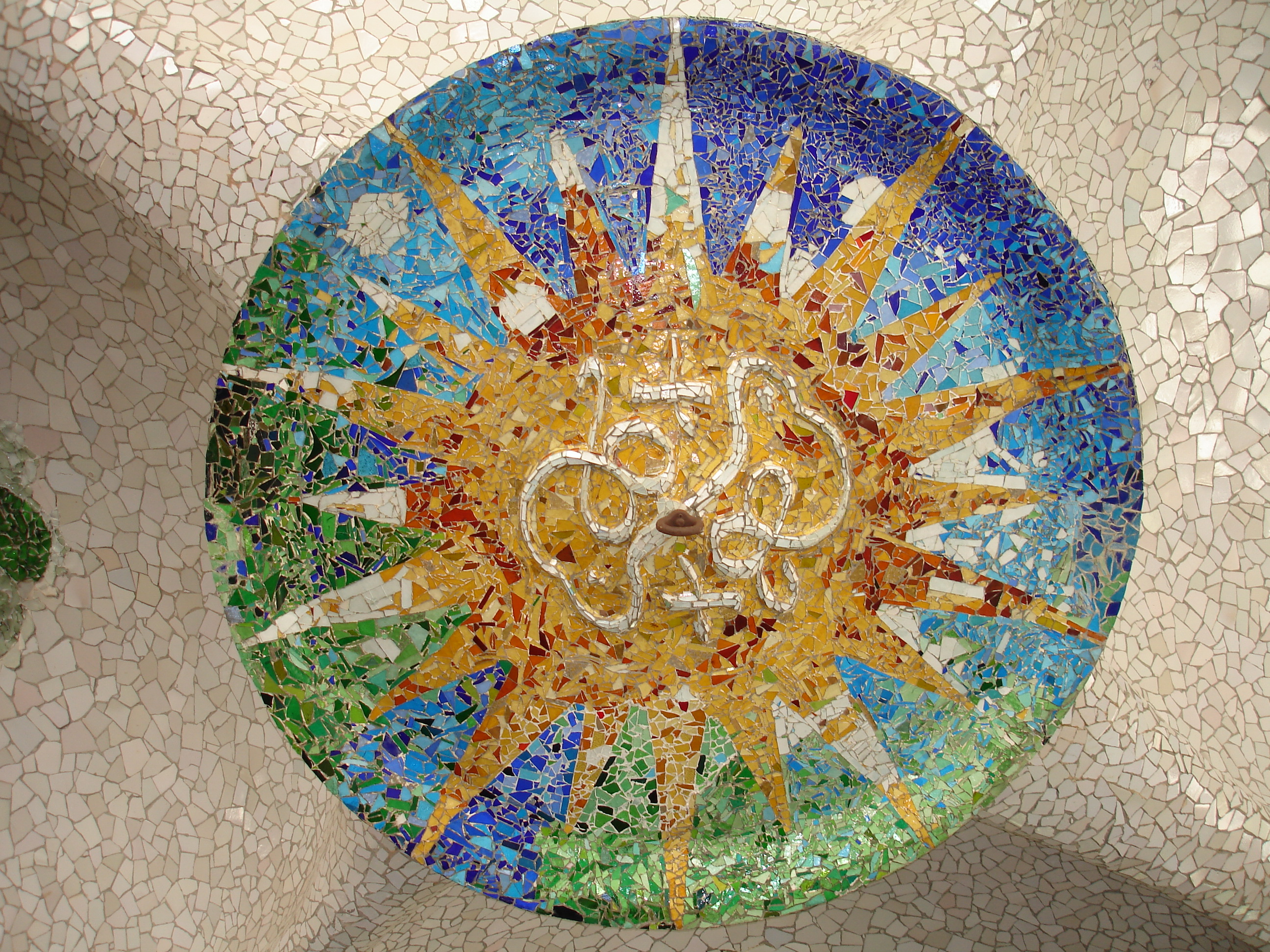
Detail of Gaudí’s ceramic tile

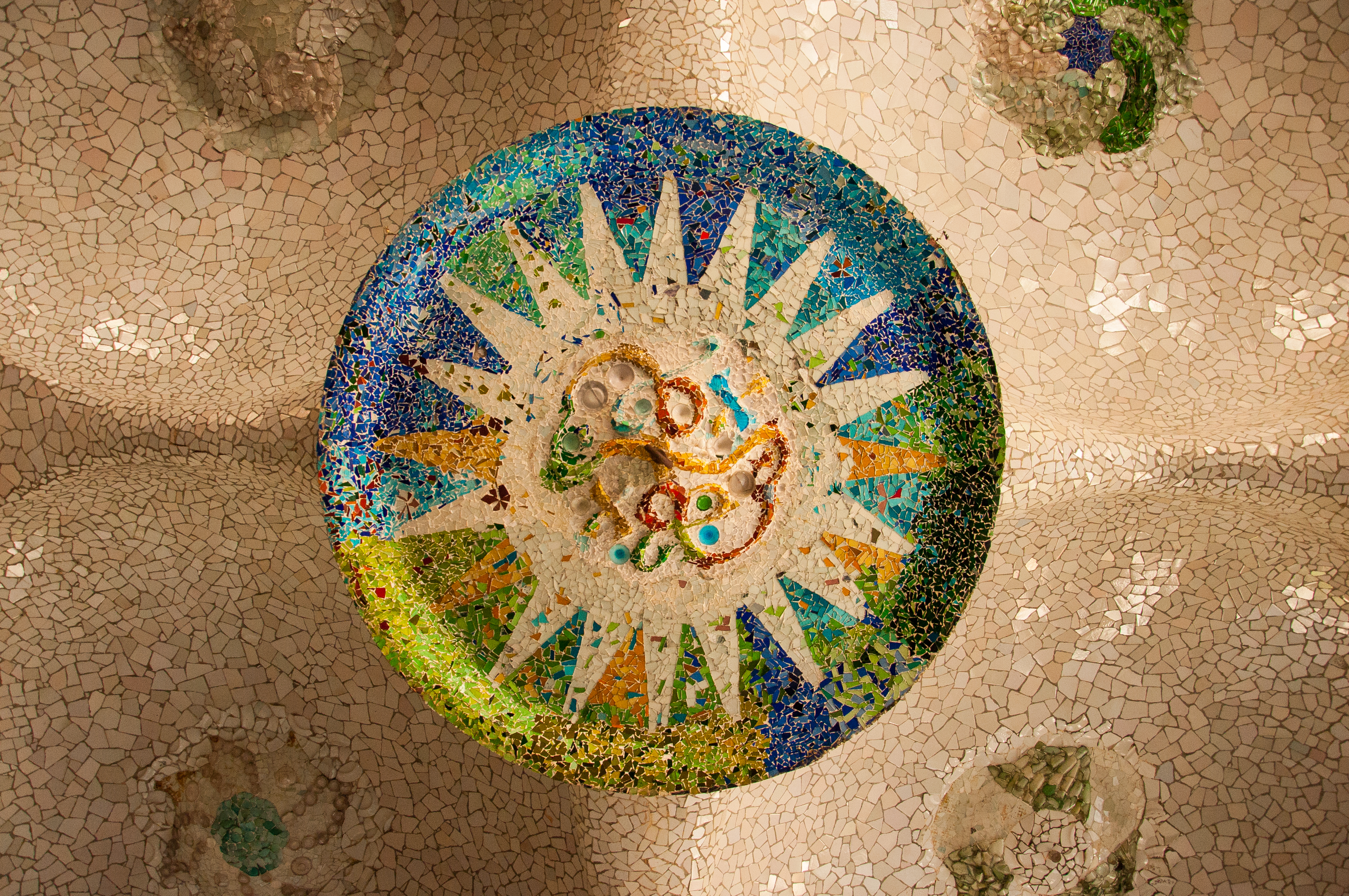
Ceiling mosaic in the Hypostyle Room

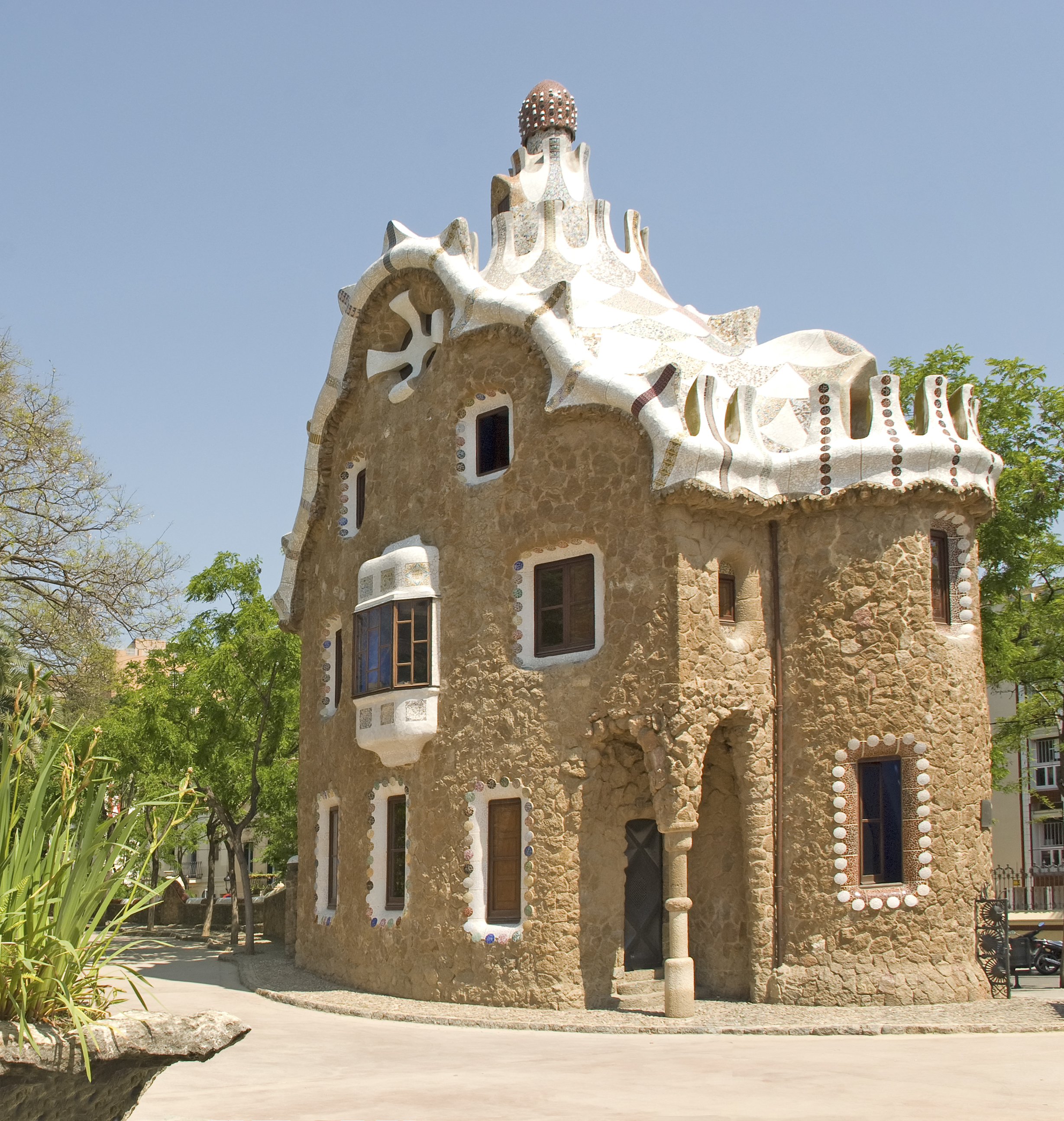
Porter’s Lodge pavilion with tile roof

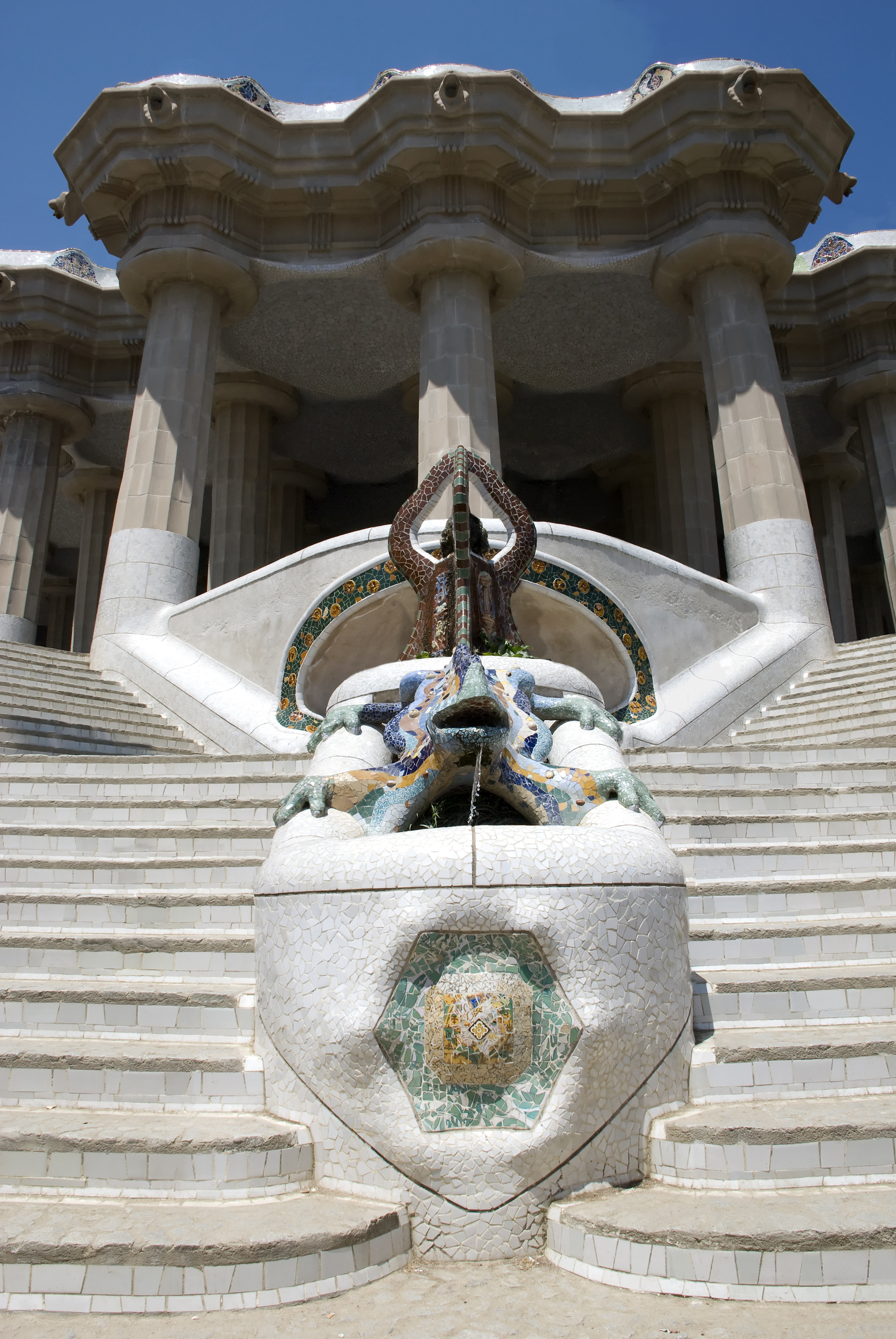
Fountain at the entrance

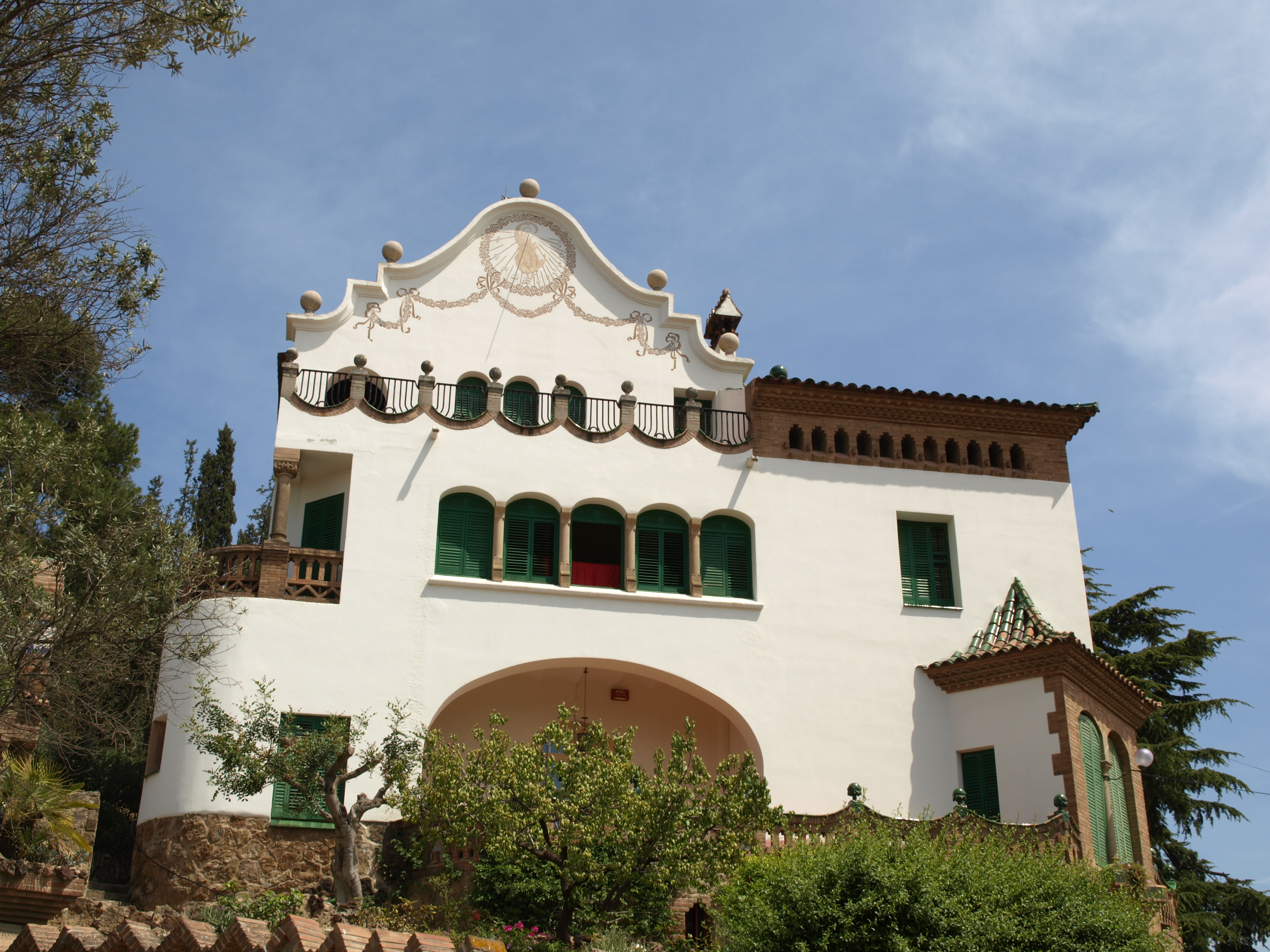
Casa Martí Trias i Domènech

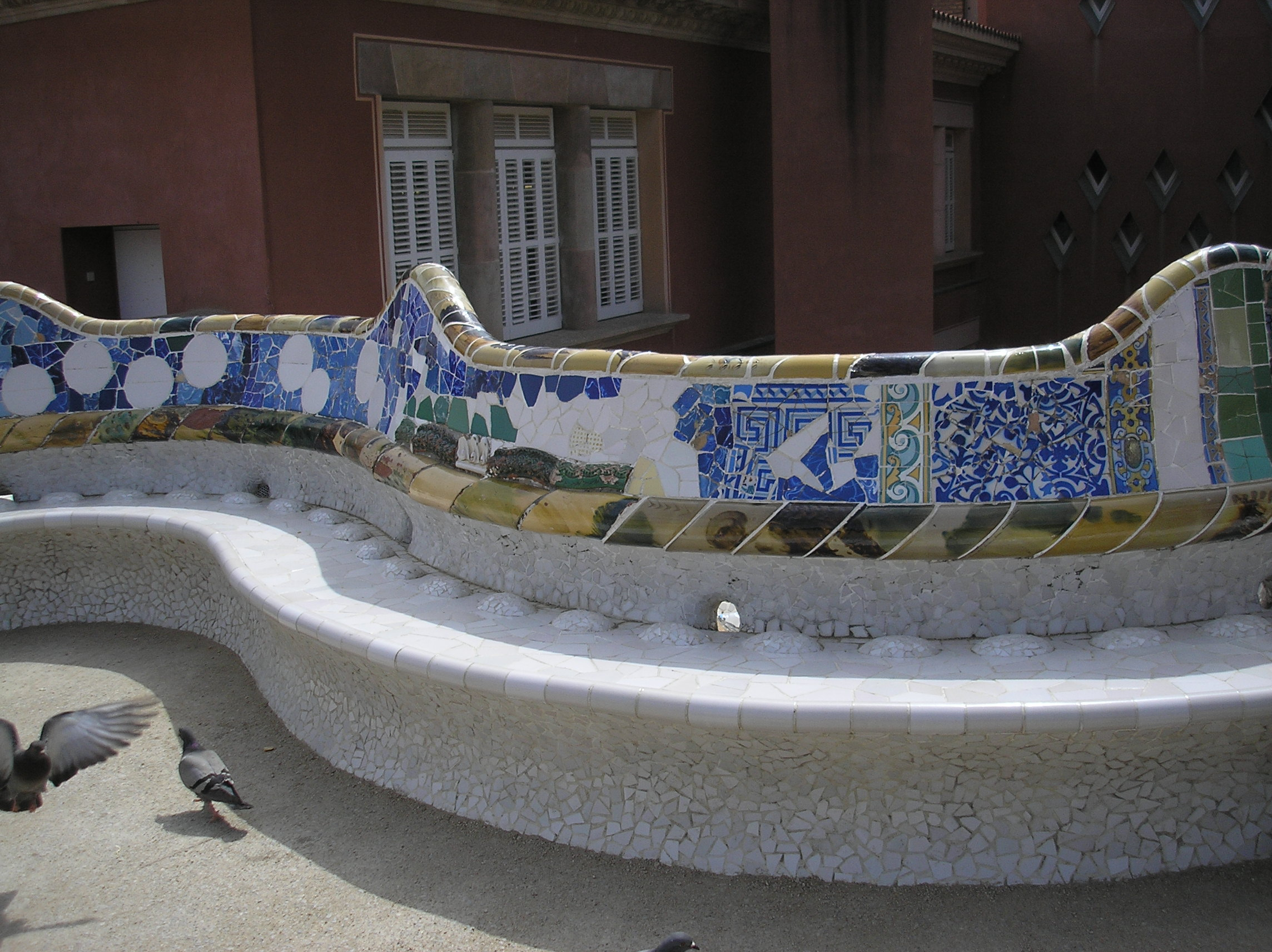
Mosaic bench on the main terrace

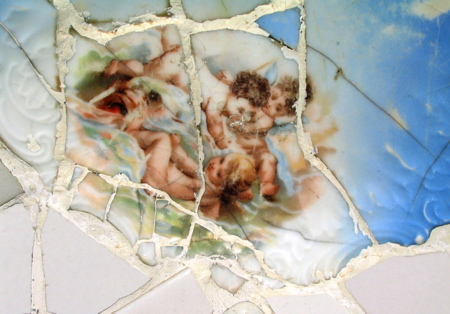
Mosaic detail

== See also ==
- List of Gaudí buildings
- List of Modernisme buildings in Barcelona
- Urban planning of Barcelona
- Parks and gardens of Barcelona
