= Francesc Berenguer i Mestres =

Spanish architect (1866–1914)

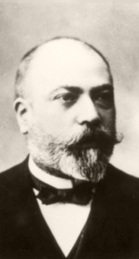
Francesc Berenguer i Mestres

Francesc Berenguer i Mestres (21 July 1866 – 8 February 1914) was a Spanish Modernista architect from Catalonia, and an assistant and friend of Antoni Gaudí.

He was born in Reus. He worked with several architectural workshops. First, he worked for August Font i Carreras, former teacher at the School, and later was with Miguel Pascual i Tintorer, municipal architect of Gràcia and Josep Graner i Prat. He died in Barcelona.
