= Dolors Aleu i Riera =

Spanish physician (1857-1913)

Dolores Aleu Riera
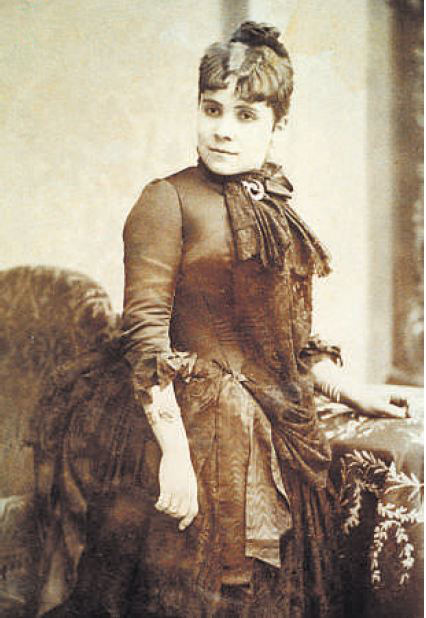
- Born: 7 April 1857; Barcelona, Catalonia, Spain
- Died: 19 February 1913 (aged 55); Barcelona, Catalonia, Spain
- Known for: First Spanish woman licensed in medicine, second Spanish woman to earn an MD
- Scientific career
- Fields: Medicine

Dolores Aleu Riera (7 April 1857 in Barcelona – 19 February 1913) was a Spanish medical doctor. She was the first woman in Spain to be licensed in medicine and the second woman in the country to earn a Doctor of Medicine degree.

== Early life and education ==
An only child, Aleu learned to read by age 5. She studied at the University of Barcelona, though during 1874–1875 she attended classes at the University of Valencia. She earned her undergraduate degree in July 1874. The following September, she enrolled in the university's medical school. Aleu completed her studies in 1879, but she did not receive permission to take the licensing exam until nearly three years later, in the spring of 1882. She finally took the exam on 19 June that year. She passed with excellent marks and thus became the first Spanish woman licensed to practice medicine. On 8 October 1882 Aleu became just the second Spanish woman to earn a doctorate in medicine (she received her MD a few days after Martina Castells Ballespí).

Her thesis, presented on October 6, was titled On the need to set the hygienic and moral education of women on a new course, and supervised by Professor Joan Giné i Partagàs, dean of the Faculty of Medicine and rector of the UB. In it, she criticized discrimination against women. Her thesis is stored at the Biblioteca Pública Arús.

== Career ==
Aleu specialized in gynecology and pediatrics. One of the first three women to study medicine in Spain (in addition to Castells and Maria Elena Maseras), Aleu alone went on to practice medicine. She opened a medical consulting firm in Barcelona, which she ran for 25 years. Castells, meanwhile, died before she could practice, and Elena Maseras dedicated her career to teaching.

Aleu was highly active during her 25 years in practice. She founded and served as a professor of domestic hygiene at the Academy of Sciences, Arts and Offices for Women, which was founded in 1885 at 10 Rambla de Canaletes by the liberal-minded musician Clotilde Cerdà i Bosch (better known by her stage name, Esmeralda Cervantes). There she taught classes about hygiene in the home.

She was the first woman to join the Société Française d’Hygiène.

Aleu was also the author of informative texts aimed at improving the quality of life for women, especially mothers. These included Advice to a Mother on Management, Cleaning, Clothing, Sleep, Exercise, and Entertaining the Children.

In addition to her own practice, Aleu worked as a general practitioner free of charge at Barcelona’s poor house, the Casa de la Caritat.

== Personal life ==
In 1883, Aleu married Camilo Cuyás Martí. They had two sons, Juan and Camilo. Juan, the elder, studied industrial engineering while Camilo studied medicine. Camilo died at age 23 from tuberculosis. It is believed his death precipitated Aleu's own death at age 56.

== Death and afterward ==
Aleu died in 1913 at the age of 56.

The Universitat of Barcelona named a room at the Faculty of Medicine and Health Sciences after Aleu. The room is used for oral examinations.

== External resources ==
- Gallery of Catalan Doctors: Dolors Aleu i Riera (in Catalan)
- Corbella, Jacinto, and Domenech, Edelmira. "A question of priority: Helena Maseras, Dolors Aleu, Martina Castells," in Proceedings of the First International Congress of the History of Catalan Medicine (Montpellier), 1970, vol. I, pp. 139–142.
- Ibero Costanso, Alba. "Aleu i Riera, Dolors", in Women in the History of Spain (Madrid: Planeta, 2000), pp. 388–390.
