= Maria Doménech =

Catalonian writer and activist

Maria Domènech i Escoté (Alcover, Alt Camp, 1877 — Barcelona, 1952) was a novelist, poet and social activist from the Catalonia region of Spain. While living in Tarragona, she wrote using the pseudonym Josep Miralles. She was later known by her married name, Maria Domènech de Cañellas.

== Biography ==
Maria's father died when she was eight months old. At the age of three, she and her mother moved to Tarragona and Maria took private lessons from her mother. Later, she wrote with the philosopher Tomàs Sucona, painted with the painter Hermenegildo Vallvé, and learned music with Father Joan Roca, because she refused to go to the Carmelite school.

=== Social activist and writer ===
Domènech contributed to several publications including La Pàtria and Camp de Tarragona using the pseudonym Josep Miralles (not to be confused with Bishop Josep Miralles i Sbert (1860–1947)).

In 1910, Doménech settled in Barcelona with her husband, a doctor from Tarragona, Francesc Cañellas, and their two children. There she started her social activism and collaborated with more magazines: Or i Grana, La Tralla, Feminal, El Poble Català, Renaixement, La Veu de Catalunya. For Feminal (a feminist publication), she had become a local correspondent when she lived in Tarragona, and when the Cañellas family moved to Barcelona, she became a collaborator with the magazine, which disappeared in 1917. According to Cavallé, in those pages, "she published a number of short literary texts, which she would later include in her books."

One of her first appearances in public as a social activist was on behalf of the Board of Ladies of the League Against Tuberculosis in Girona, in a distribution of awards to mothers who had breastfed their children longer. She took an active part in the Women's Charity Tomb, chaired by Dolors Monserdà. She was a member of the Public Instruction and Child Protection Boards of Tarragona, member of the Board of the "Liga del Bon Mot" (League of the Good Word), member of the "Junta de Primera Enseñanza de Tarragona" (Board of First Education of Tarragona) and member of the "Junta de Protección a Childhood" (Board to Protect Childhood). She was also the third vice-president of the Women's Federation against Tuberculosis, which was chaired by Leonor Canalejas de Farga.

Doménech participated in the women's philanthropic and educational movement, carried out by Francesca Bonnemaison, Dolors Monserdà and Carme Karr i Alfonsetti. She gave several conferences in favor of women and their status as workers throughout Catalonia and Madrid. In 1912, she founded and chaired the Workers' Federation, with the aim of providing women with access to culture and education, as well as defending their rights as workers.

Throughout the years, she was also an active writer. In 1915, Doménech published a collection of poems and narratives entitled Verso i prosa, as well as the novels Neus (1914), Contrallum (1917), Golden Toads (1919) and Inheritance (1925).

Doménech collaborated with the Barcelona Institute of Social Reforms (1918) and gave speeches on the condition of women, work at home, and workers and women's professions at the Ateneu Barcelonès and other institutions such as the Agrupació Feminal and the Social Museum of Barcelona.

In 1923 she attended commissions in Switzerland for the "study of institutions" aimed at the protection, moral progress and material well-being of all workers, not just women.

=== Member of Congress ===
For a month in 1930, she was a Member of the Congress in Madrid, and she was the first Assistant Inspector of Work in Spain.

=== Later years ===
In 1946 she published a collection of poems, Al rodar del temps, and a novel in Spanish, Confidencias.

According to Cavallé, Maria Domènech's social activity was remarkable "due to the large number of tasks she participated in and the role that she played in the ideological search of Catalan society, mainly as regards the role of women. He goes on to say, "she regards man and woman as 'the two essential parts of the whole called humanity.' Both are of an identical nature, but each presents 'those variants which are proper to the modalities which were assigned to them in their creation.'"

== Selected works ==
=== Poetry ===
- Al rodar del temps (As time rolls by) (1946)

The following were contributions to the Floral Games in Barcelona:

- Mireia (1915)
- La santa mà (1916)
- Varena (1917)
- Alda i Roland (1920)
- Lliberació (1934)
- Pels voltans de la Seu (1934)

=== Novels ===
- Snows (1914)
- Backlight (1917)
- The Golden Toads (1919)
- Inheritance (1925)
- He ... (1925)

=== Stories ===
- Confidències (1946)

=== Theater ===
- The Saint of La Mercè (1918)
- To Temptas (1922)

== Awards ==
- First prize in the Natural Flower category for her poem Mireia (1915)
- Silver Medal of Labor (1923)
