= Sansoni =

Sansoni is a surname. Notable people with the surname include:

- Barbara Sansoni (1928–2022), Sri Lankan designer, artist, colourist, entrepreneur, and writer
- Clara Sansoni (1993 – after 1971), Italian pianist and student of Isaac Albéniz
- Doreen Sansoni (1911–1977), Sri Lankan tennis player
- Héctor Barrantes Sansoni (1939–1990), Argentine polo player and stepfather of Sarah Ferguson
- Louis Sansoni (c.1775 – 1831), Postmaster General of Ceylon
- Miliani Sansoni, Sri Lankan judge
- Raffaele Sansoni Galeoti Riario (1461–1521), Italian cardinal
- Sébastien Sansoni (born 1978), French footballer
- Stéphane Sansoni (born 1967), professional tennis player from France

== See also ==
- Sansoni (publisher), Italian publisher founded in 1873 in Florence
- Autographa sansoni, also known as the Alberta beauty, a moth of the family Noctuidae
- Habronattus sansoni, a species of jumping spider in the family Salticidae
