= Gine =

Gine may refer to:

== People ==
- Alejandro Moya Gine, Spanish lightweight rower
- Aleksander Gine (1830–1980), Russian painter
- Gine (cartoonist), French cartoonist
- Joan Giné i Partagàs (1836–1903), Spanish physician and writer
- Mary Gine Riley (1883–1939), American painter
- Uri Giné (born 1986), Spanish musician
- Xantal Giné (born 1992), Spanish field hockey defender

== Other ==
- Gine, wife of the character Bardock
- "Giné", song by American rapper 6ix9ine
