= Lluïsa Vidal =

Spanish painter

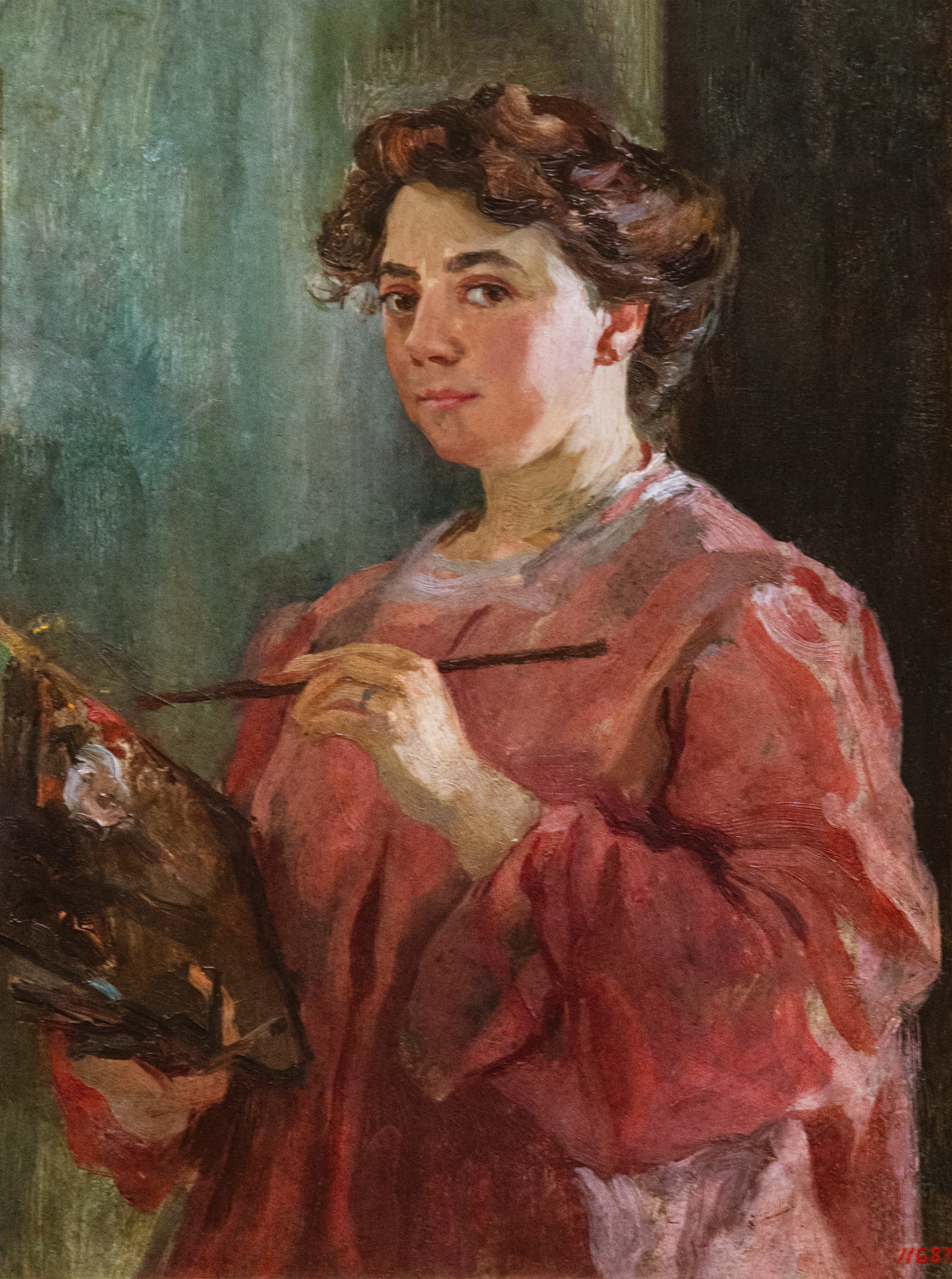
- Self-portrait from 1899
- Born: 2 April 1876; Barcelona
- Died: 22 October 1918 (aged 42); Barcelona
- Known for: Painting
- Movement: Catalan modernism

Lluïsa Vidal i Puig (Barcelona, 2 April 1876 – 22 October 1918) was a painter. Raised in a well-off family closely related to Catalan modernist circles, she is known as the only professional woman painter of Catalan modernism, and one of the few women of that period who went abroad to receive art lessons.

== Biography ==
Born in the number 13 of Barcelona's Trafalgar street, Lluïsa Vidal was the second of 12 siblings (ten girls and two boys): one of her sisters became associated with Pablo Casals, and another one became the wife of the philologist and writer Manuel de Montoliu. Her father, Francesc Vidal i Jevellí, was a cabinetmaker, set designer, and a foundry worker interested in art and business. Lluïsa grew up in an encouraging environment for artistic creations. She received her first lessons from her father, and also from Joan González (Julio González's brother), Arcadi Mas i Fondevila and Simó Gómez. While in Paris, she attended Eugène Carrière's lessons, and she was especially influenced by artists such as Santiago Rusiñol (composition resources) and Ramon Casas (portraits).

When she was 16 she visited Madrid with her father and went for the first time to Museo del Prado, where she discovered Spanish masters such as Francisco de Goya or Diego Velázquez and realised the economic value of a good portraitist.

Her professional career started in 1898, when she was 22 and held her first exhibition at Quatre Gats in Barcelona. It was her first exhibition, and she became the first and only woman to hold an exhibition there, though some researchers doubt she even held an exhibition there in her early years, as in the early stages of her career she was closely controlled by her father, who was more prone to less bohemian environments than that of Quatre Gats.

In April 1898 she exhibited three portraits at the 4th Exhibition of Fine Arts and Artistic Industries in Barcelona. This exhibition held over 2,000 works, some by Ramon Casas, Santiago Rusiñol, Joan Brull, Joaquim Mir, Ramon Pichot and Arcadi Mas i Fondevila. She received an honorific mention for one of her portraits, which depicted a priest named Collell. A brief review published in La Vanguardia mentioned Vidal as one of the best participants, stating that a portrait about a girl in Sitges was so simple and suggestive that could be envied by other male portrait painters. Another review, published in Diari de Barcelona stated that her portraits were so remarkable that those artworks were recommended as an outstanding example of her abilities. In November 1898 she held her first exhibition at Sala Parés, with the help of her father and Mas i Fondevila.

=== In Paris ===
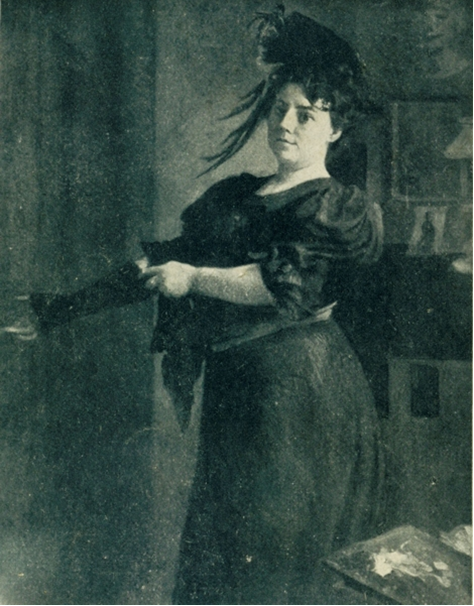
Lluïsa Vidal. Self-portrait putting on her jacket

Vidal left for Paris in 1901. She received her first lessons there from Henri-Léopold Lévy, a republican and academicist painter, but she soon enrolled at Académie Julian, whose women's section was commanded by Amélie Beaury-Saurel, Julian's wife and former student of the academy, also born in Barcelona. She soon abandoned the academy, disappointed, and after a short trip to England in 1902 she attended Georges Picard and Eugène Carrière's lessons at Georges Humbert's academy.

While in Paris she learned about the feminist movement and La Fronde, a newspaper published only by women since 1897. She also attended conferences and visited museums, and became more independent and self-confident about her art. She came back to Barcelona in 1902, as three of her sisters were ill, another one was abroad and the family was undergoing economic difficulties.

=== Back to Barcelona ===
Vidal went back to Barcelona with a lot of finished artworks and a feminist mentality. She met Carmen Karr, Dolors Monserdà and Francesca Bonnemaison, and started preparing several exhibitions. Pèl & Ploma magazine published several of her artworks, and she held an exhibition again at Sala Parés. On the other hand, while her family life was crumbling she reached the best stages of her artistic life, becoming the illustrator of Feminal magazine and holding several exhibitions in Madrid and Barcelona. She also started giving private painting lessons in 1908 so as to earn more money to sustain her family, and in 1911 she opened her own academy, placed in Isidre Nonell's ancient studio.

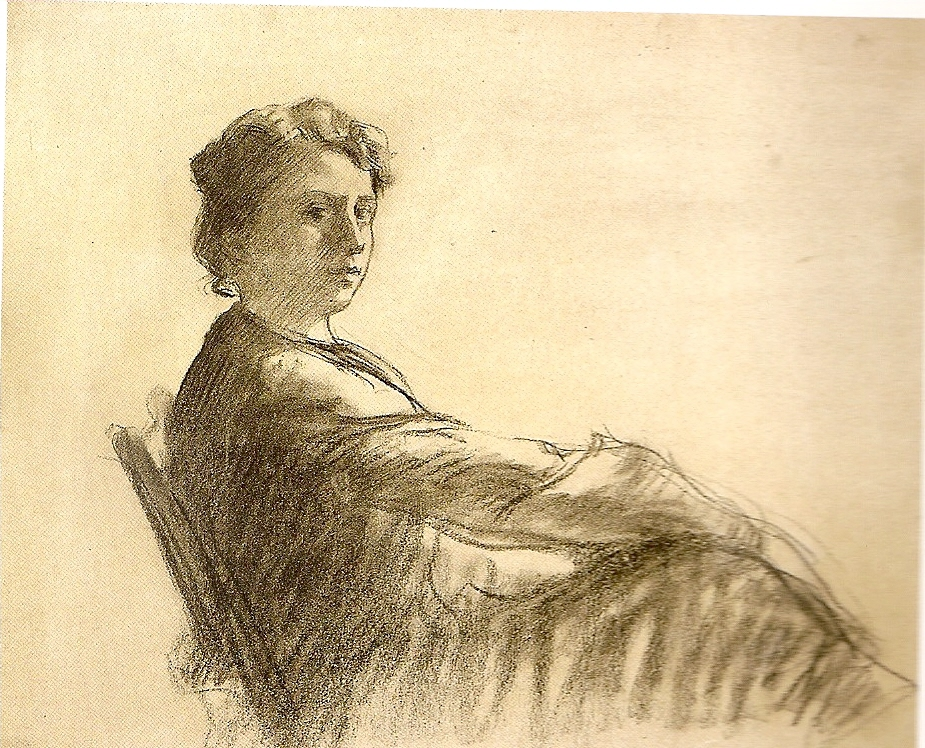
Lluïsa Vidal. Self-portrait

Vidal became especially committed during Tragic Week, when she joined the Women's Popular Library and the Culture Institute, a project devised by Francesca Bonnemaison in 1909 so as to help single, working-class women to get an education. She also became a pacifist activist during World War I, when she joined the organisation of the Feminist Pacifist Committee.

In 1914 she held a renowned exhibition at Sala Parés, and Barcelona's press qualified her as a "distinguished woman" and "celebrated artist", which Carmen Karr (aka Joana Romeu in Feminal) found deeply annoying.

Vidal died of the Spanish flu in 1918. She wrote her will on October 12 and left all her belongings to her single sisters. She did not state her profession, as that information was not needed in Spanish documents of that period.

== Work ==
Vidal has been considered a Catalan modernism painter, based on the chosen themes, the colour tones and luminous transparencies used. With Joaquim Mir, Oriol Junyent, Joan González, Xavier Gosé, R. Canals and Ramon Pichot, Vidal has been considered as a member of the second Catalan modernism generation. Even some of her works had been attributed to Ramon Casas, as both artists show the influence of Diego Velázquez, John Singer Sargent, James McNeill Whistler or Édouard Manet.

=== Portraits ===
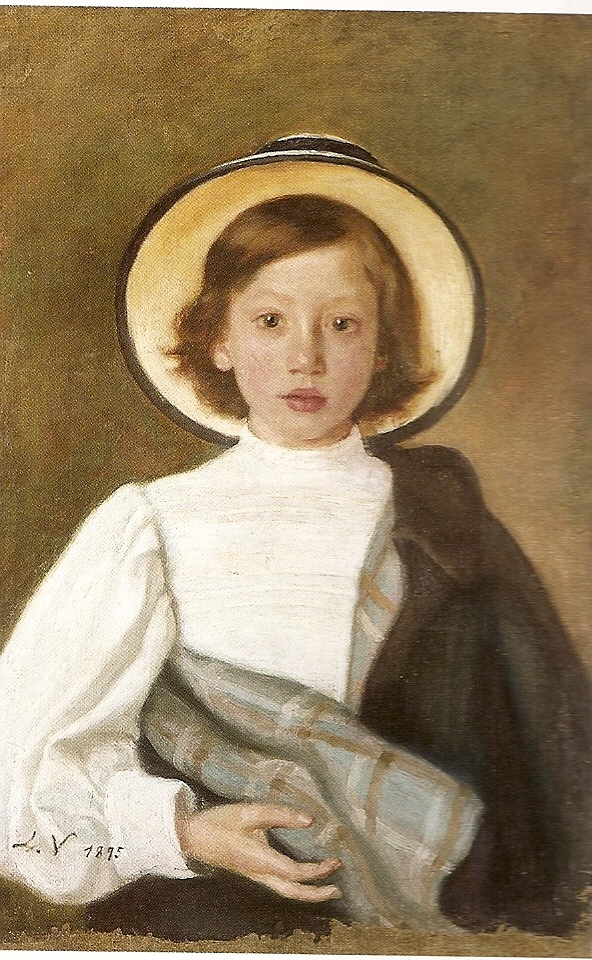
Frederic Vidal, the artist's brother, 1895

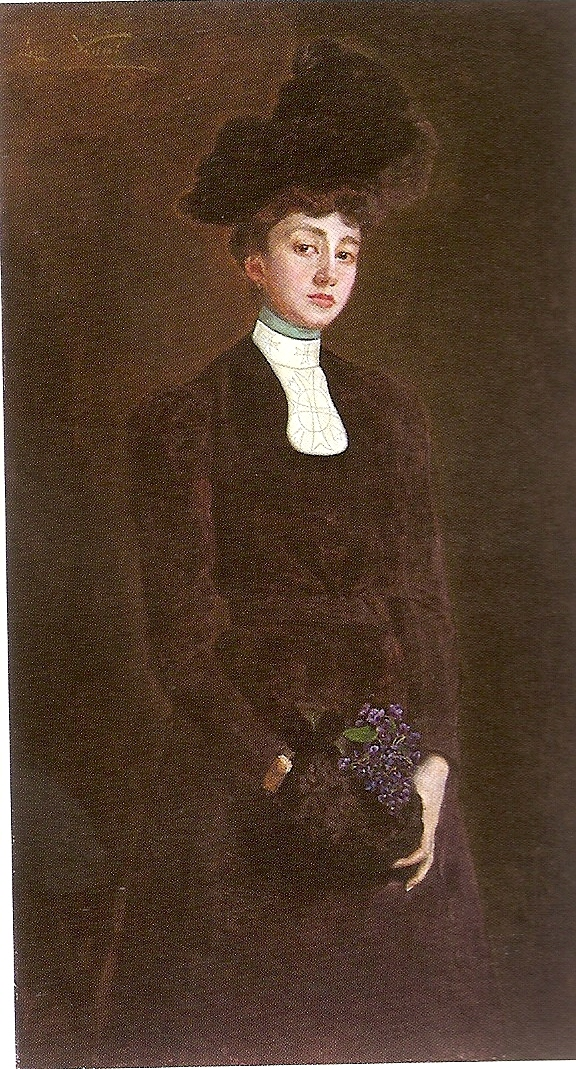
Maria Luisa Güell i López, 1900

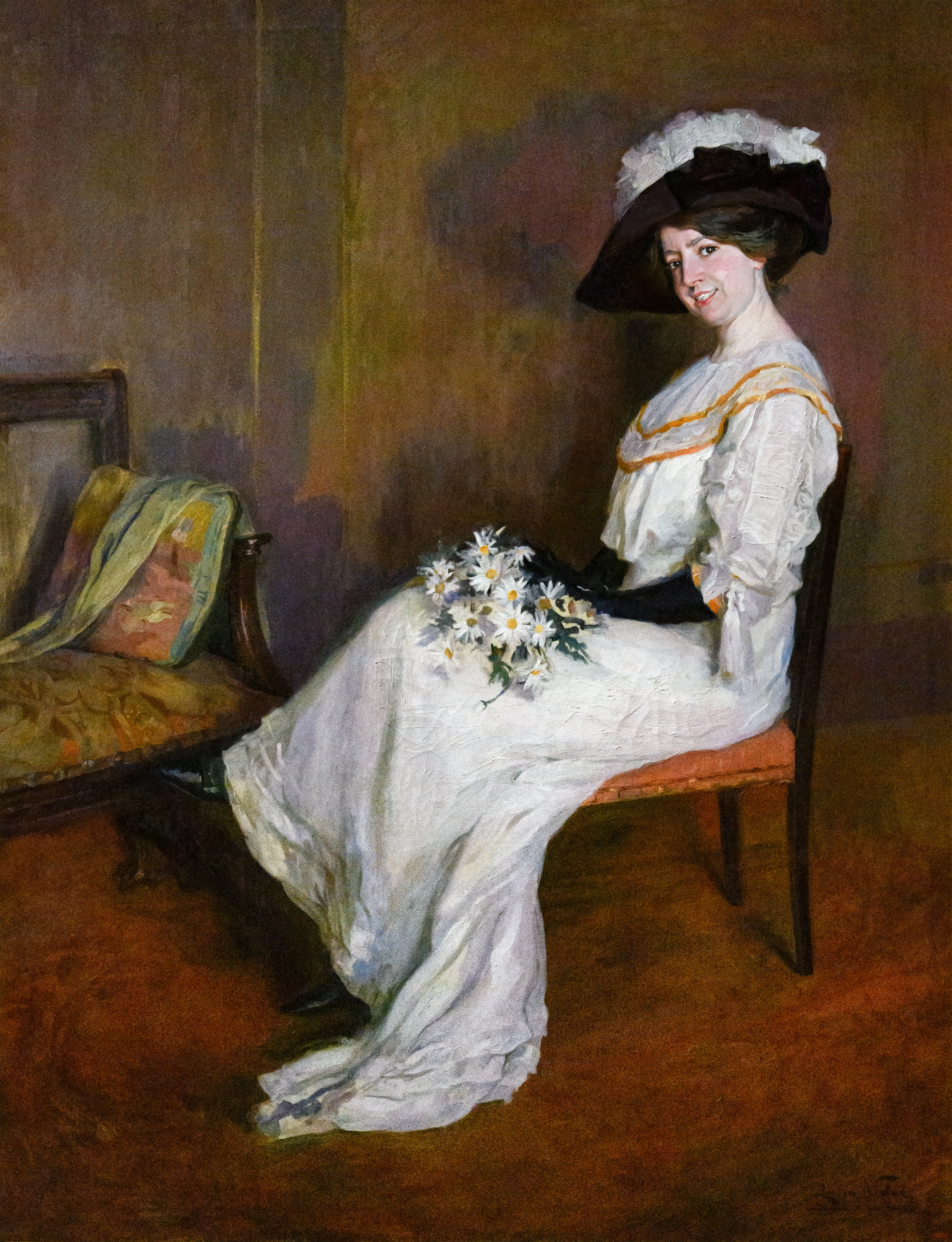
Marta Vidal, the artist's sister

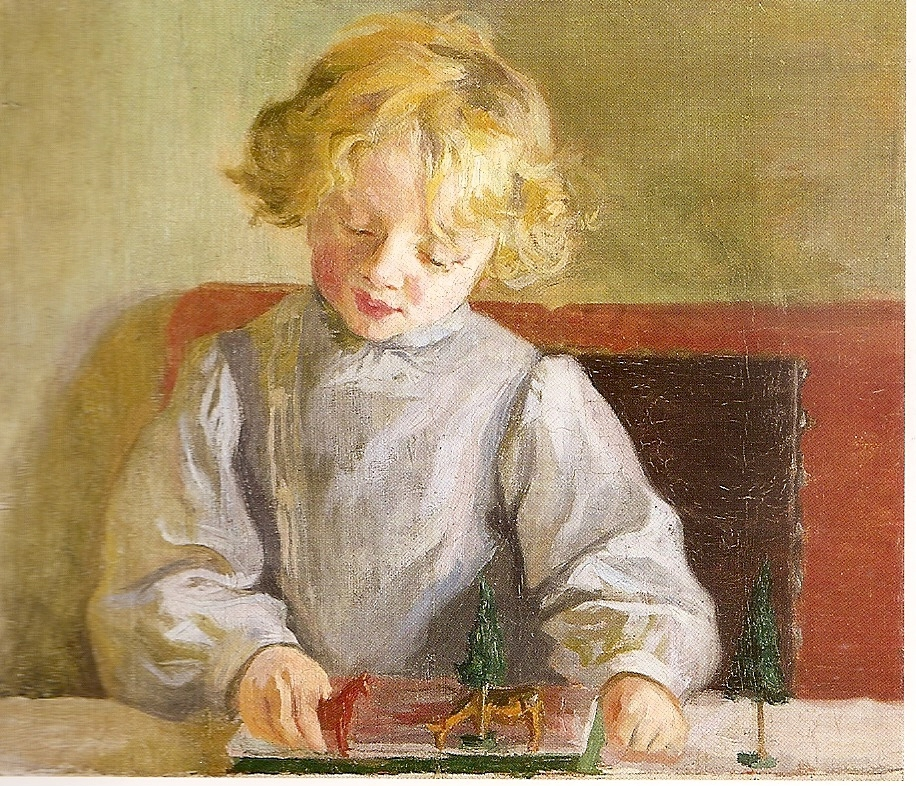
Marcel Montoliu, the artist's nephew

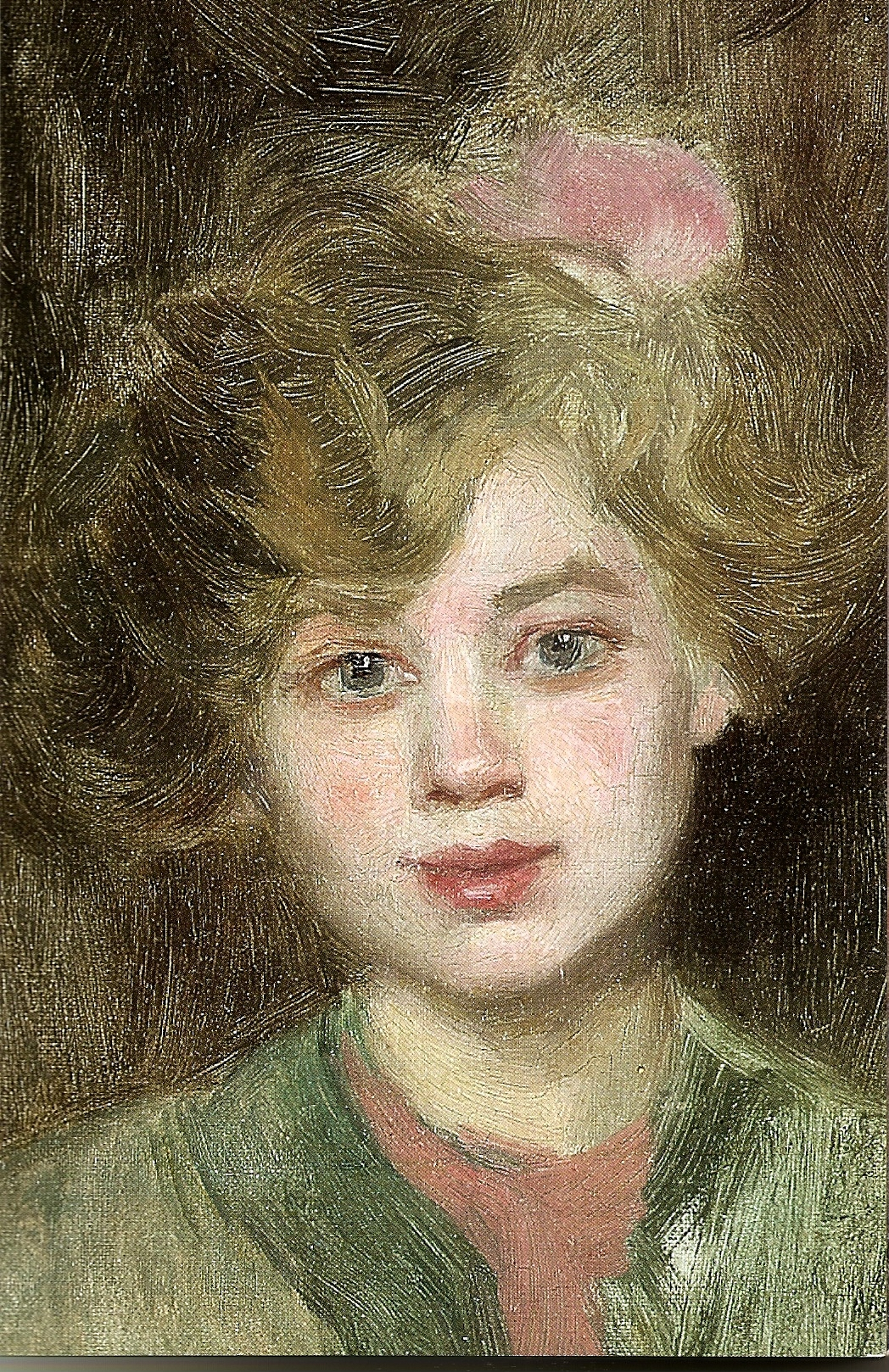
Carlota Vidal, 1903

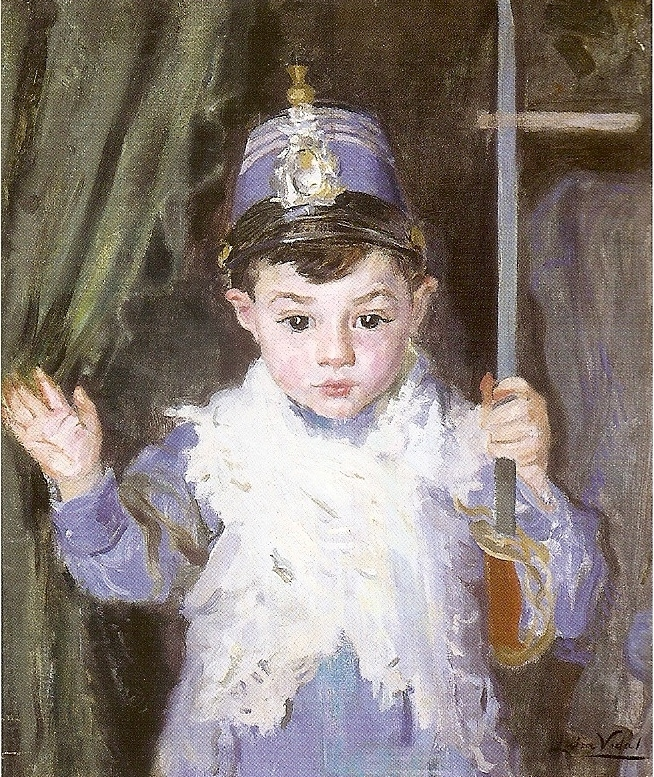
Title unknown, c. 1903 – 1905

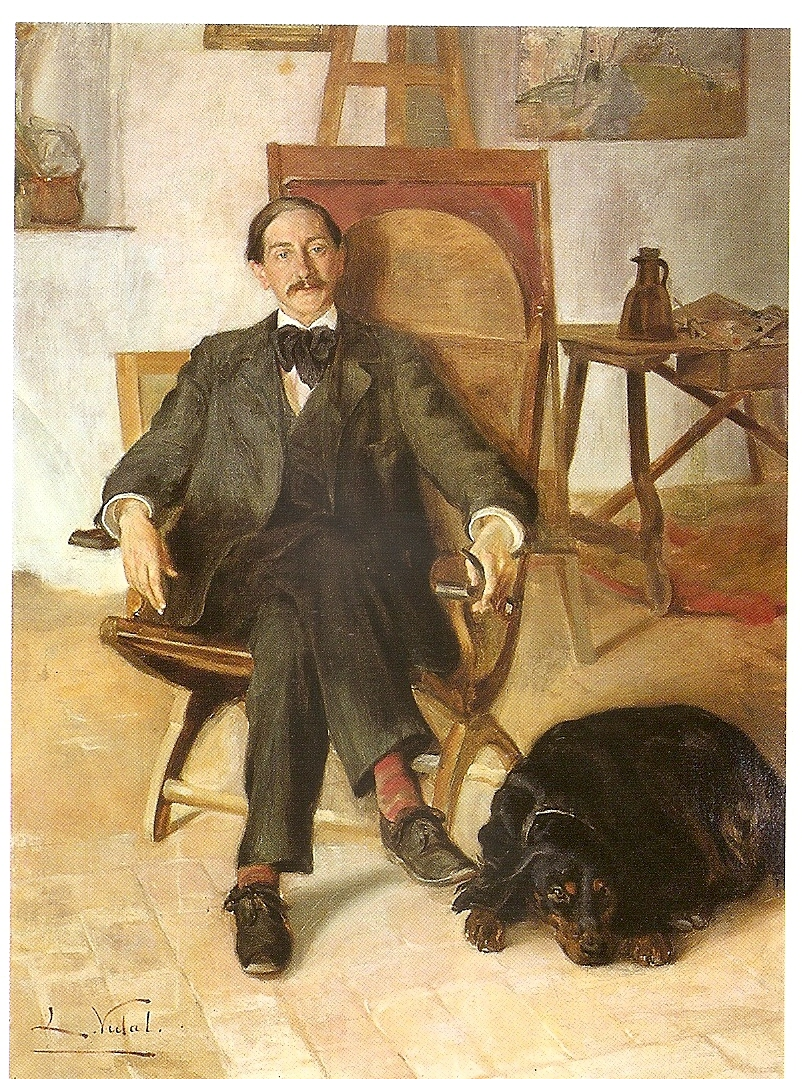
Ricard Canals, c. 1907 – 1908

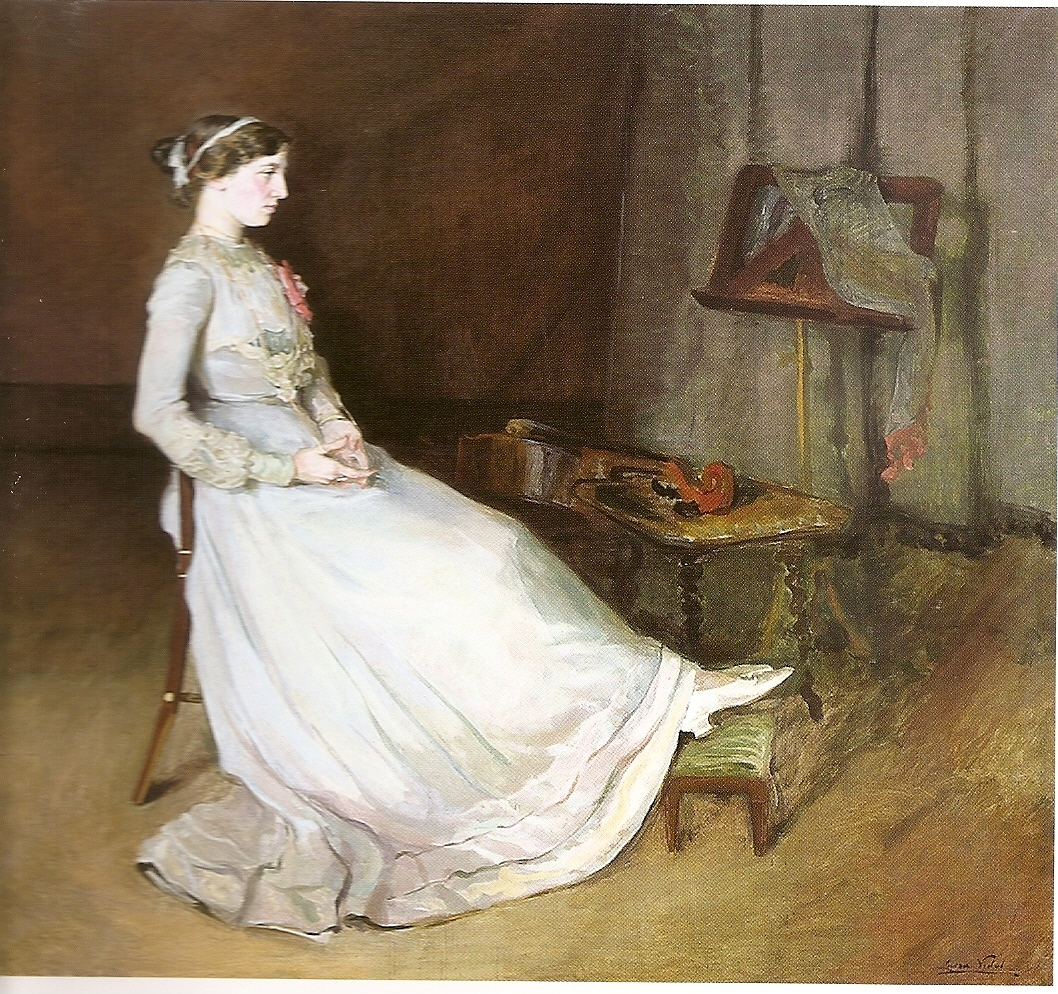
Francisca Vidal, 1909

=== Genre scenes ===
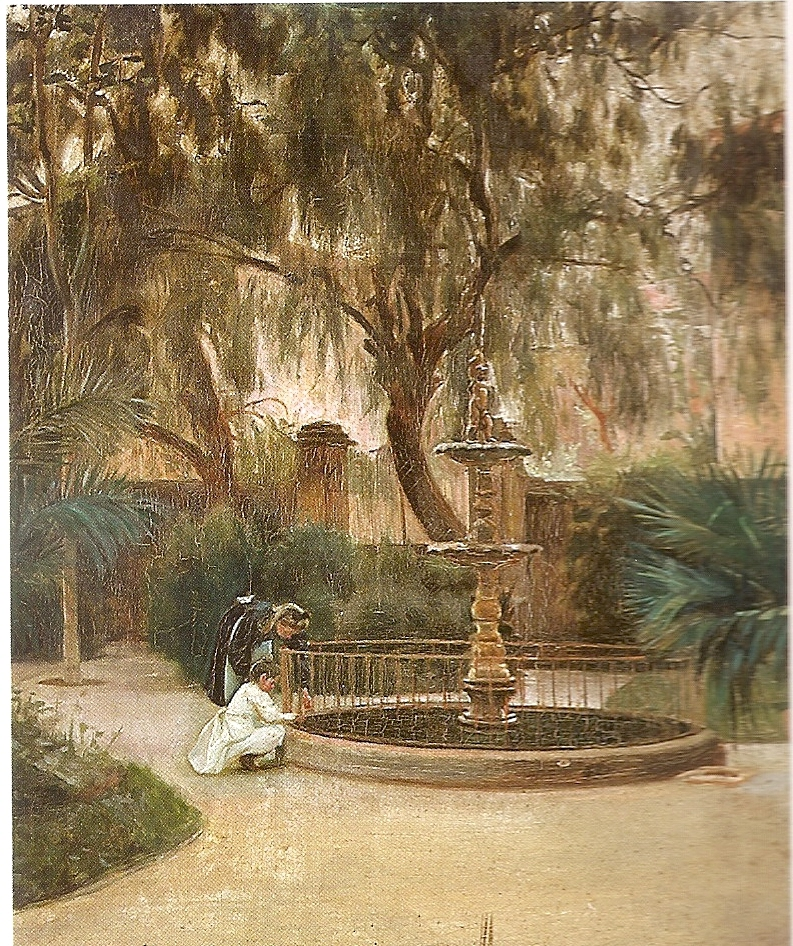
Unknown title, c. 1890 – 1900

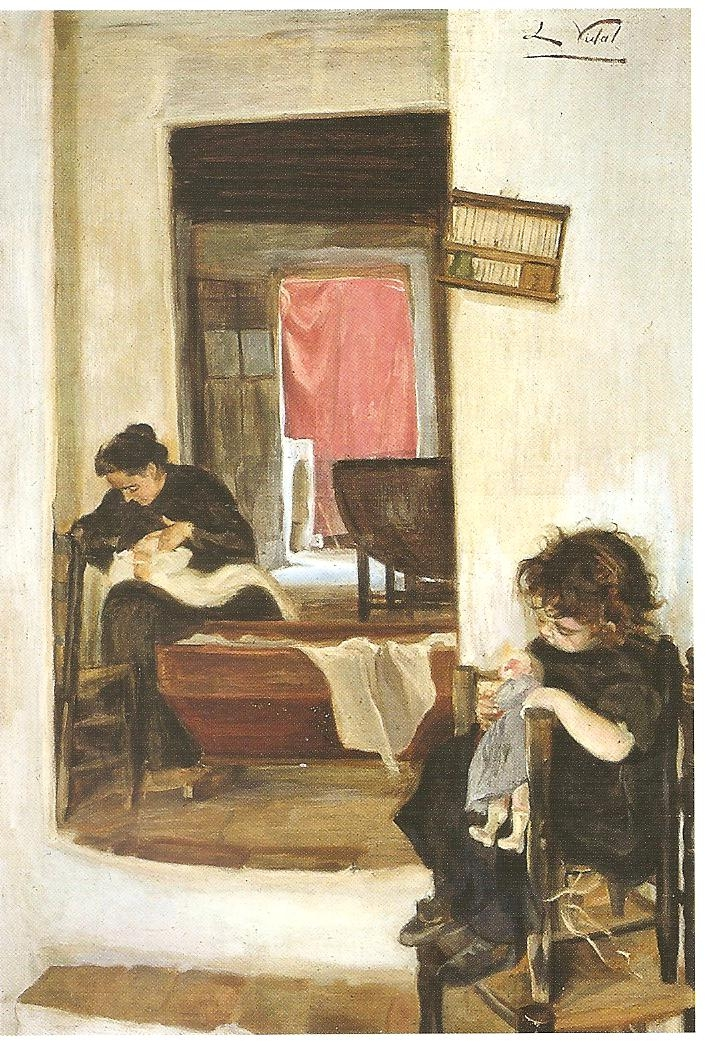
Maternity, c. 1897

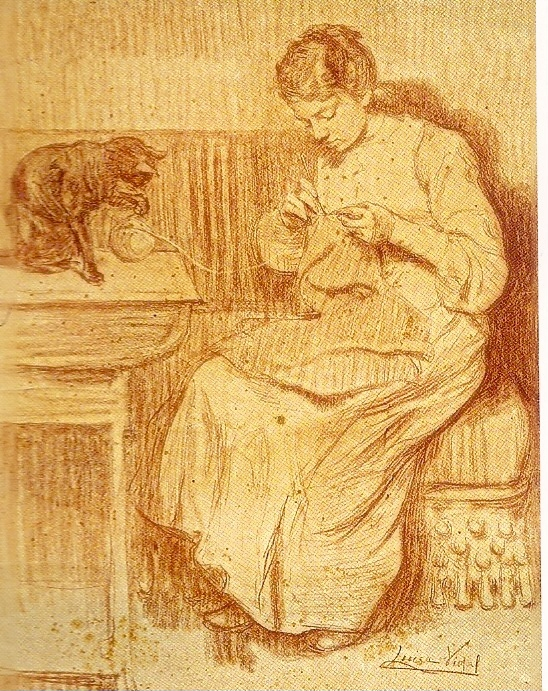
Title unknown, c. 1903

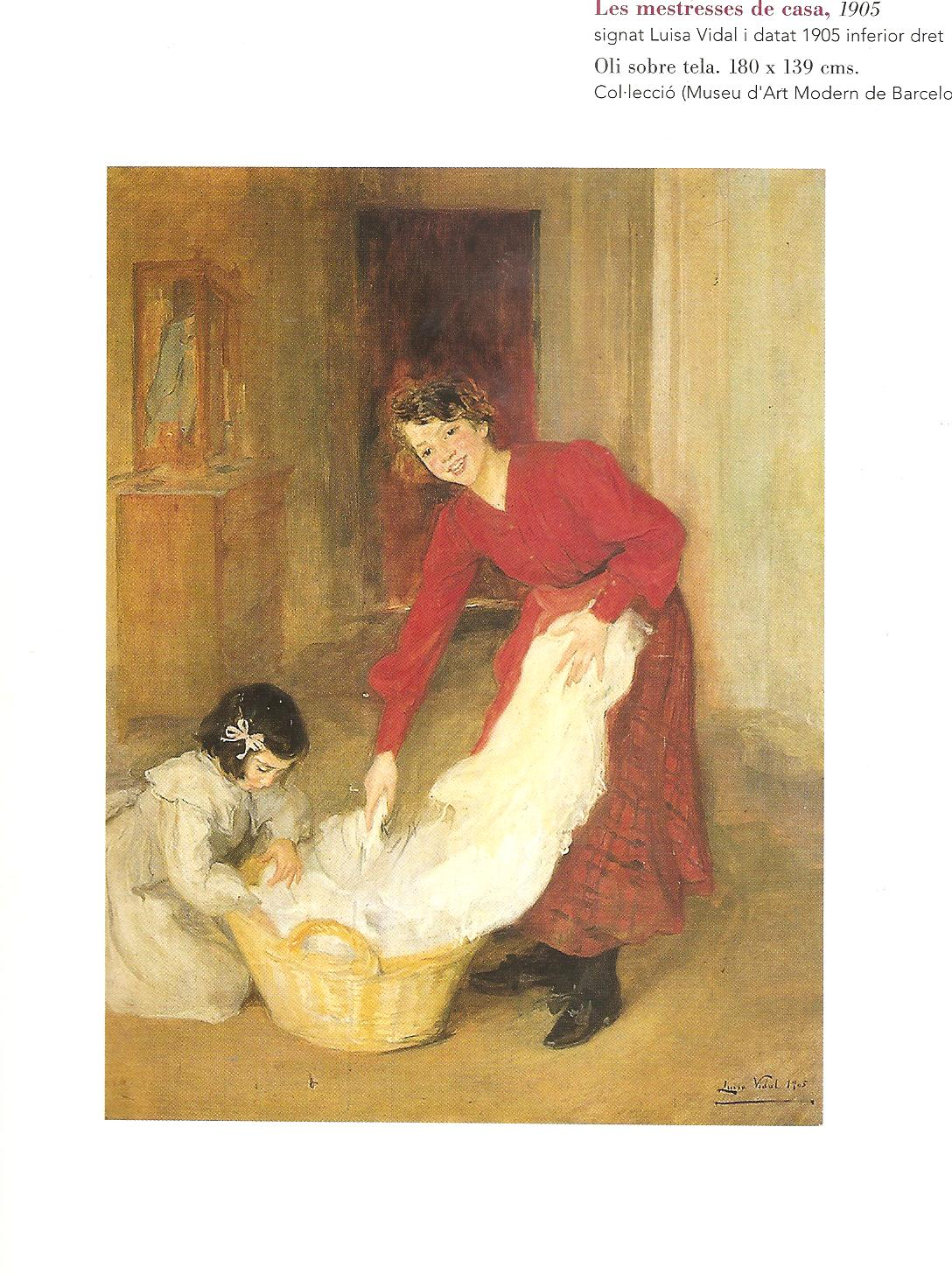
Housewives, 1905

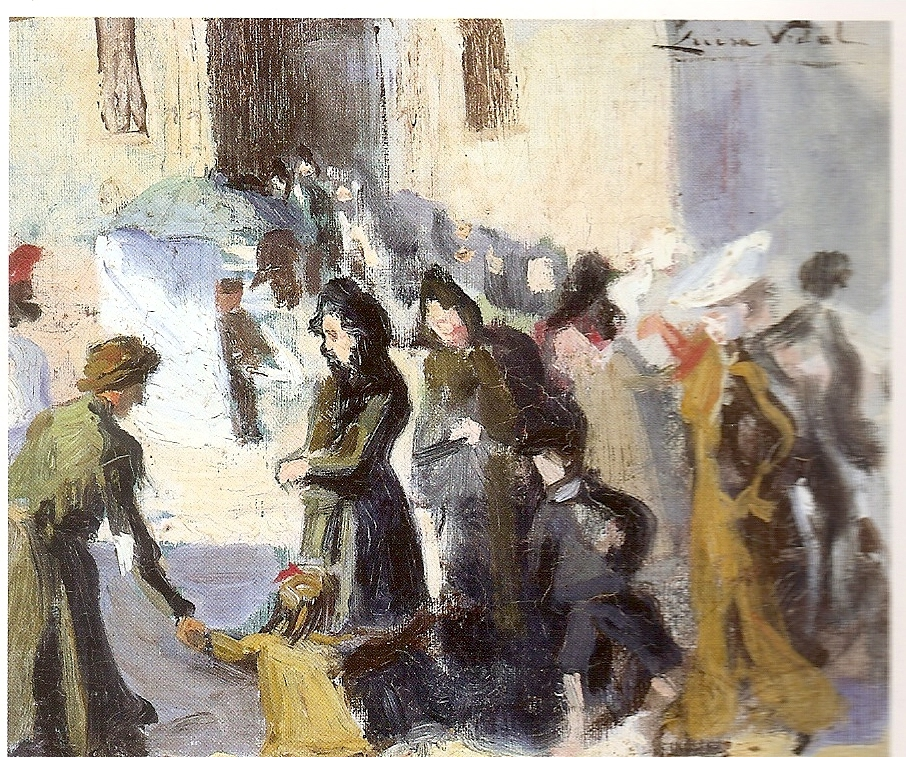
Back from mass, c. 1909 – 1918

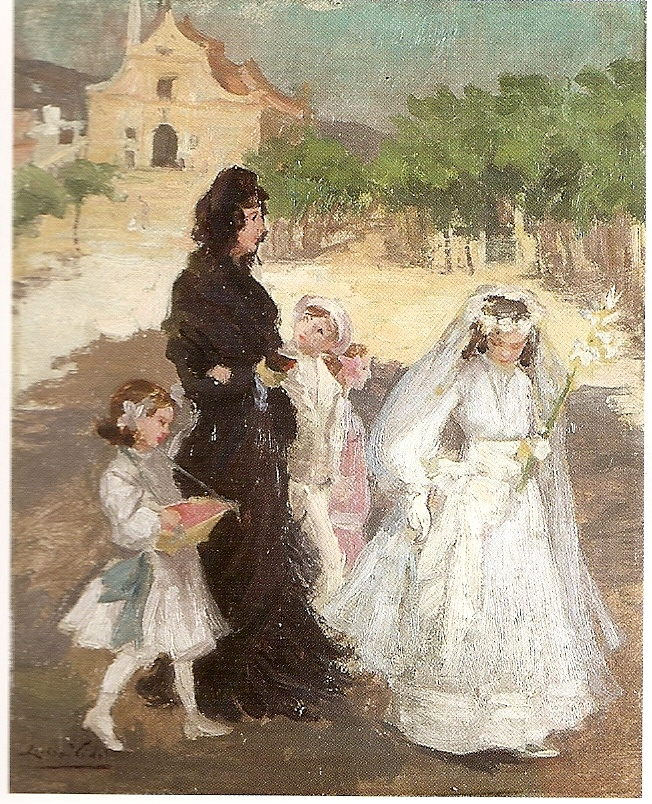
First communion, c. 1909 – 1918

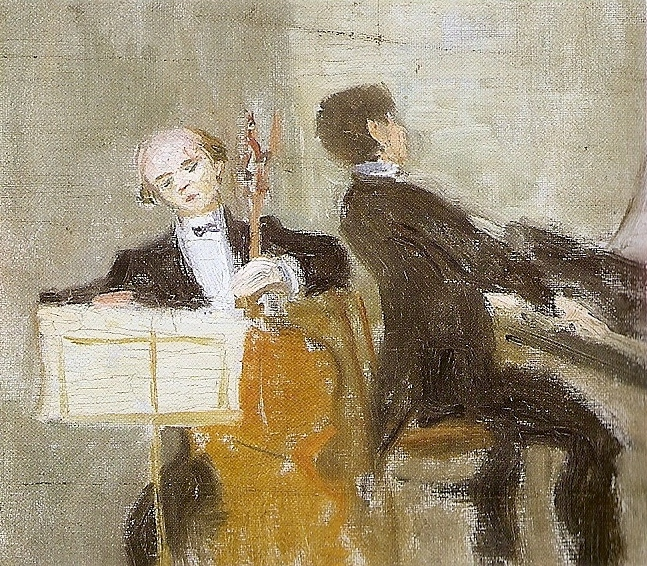
Pablo Casals and Enric Granados, c. 1911.1914

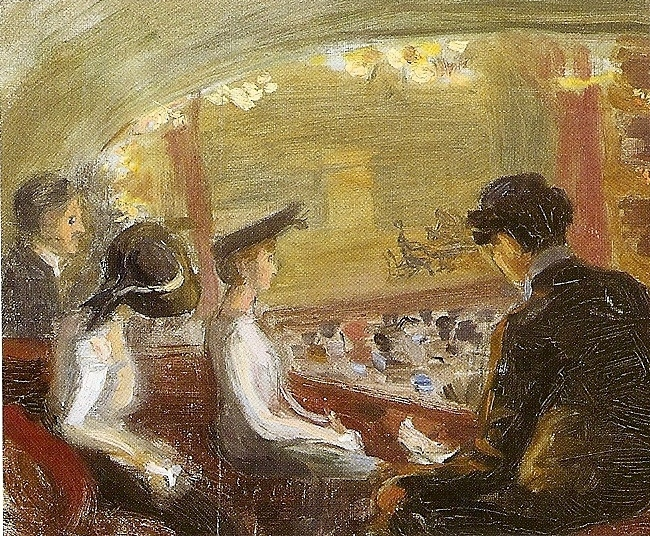
Enric Granados's concert, c. 1911 – 1912

=== Drawings ===
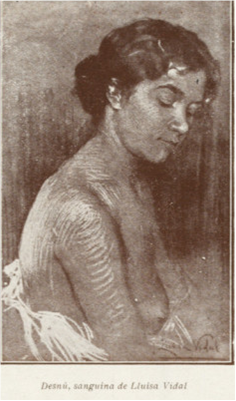
Nude, published in Feminal

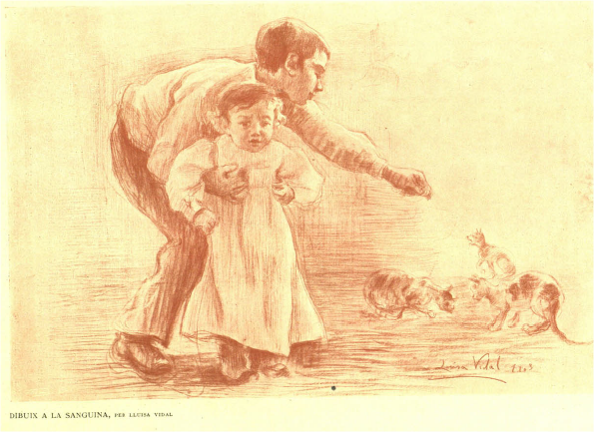
Young boys with kittens. Pèl & Ploma, 1903

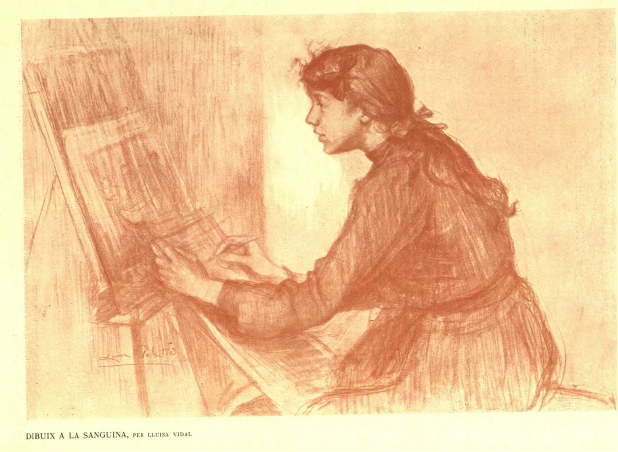
Girl drawing. Pèl & Ploma, 1903

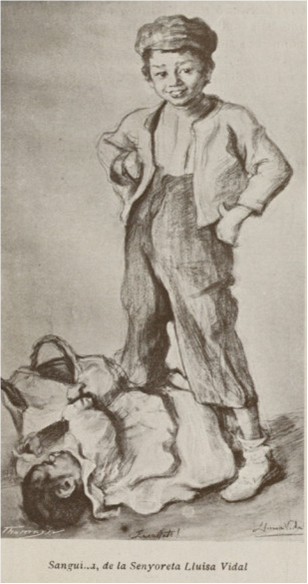
Boys. Feminal, 1908

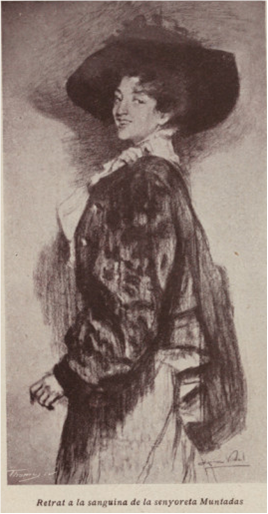
Miss Muntadas. Feminal, 1909

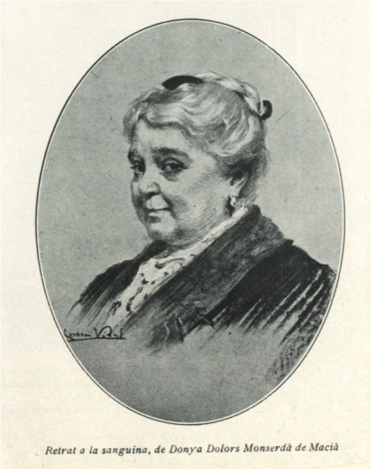
Dolors Monserdà, Feminal, 1914

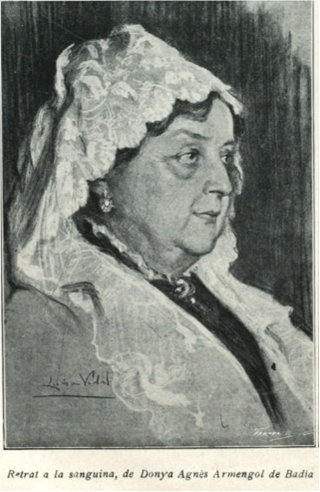
Agnès Armengol. Feminal, 1914

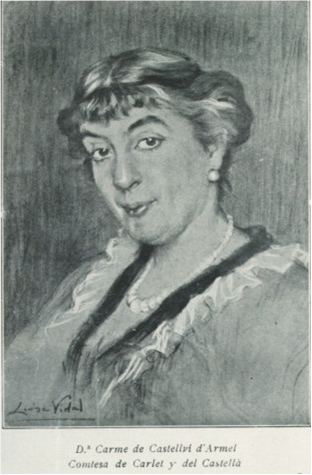
Carme Castellví. Feminal, 1914

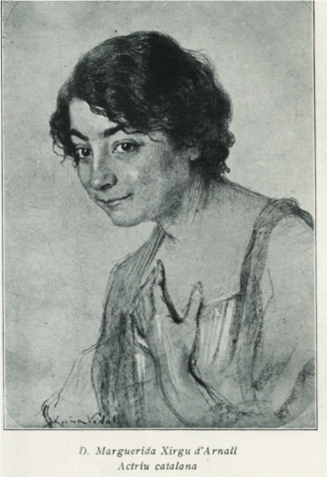
Margarida Xirgu. Feminal, 1914

== Bibliography ==
- Campmany, Maria Aurèlia; Santos Torroella, Rafael (1975). Sis pintores catalanes: Lola Anglada, Teresa Romero, Pepita Teixidor, Consol Tomàs, Visitació Ubach, Lluïsa Vidal: exposició antològica (in Catalan). Sabadell: Acadèmia de Belles Arts de Sabadell.
- Cirici Pellicer, Alexandre (1951). El arte modernista catalán. Barcelona: Aymà.
- Coll Mirabent, Isabel (1989). Algunes notícies sobre Lluïsa Vidal i Puig, Pintora del segle XIX. Separata Miscel·lània Penedesaneca. Institut d'Estudis Penedesencs.
- Fontbona, Francesc; Miralles, Francesc (1985). Del Modernisme al Noucentisme. Història de l'art català (in Catalan). Barcelona: Edicions 62.
- Oltra, Consol (1913). Lluïsa Vidal. La mirada d'una dona, l'empremta d'una artista. Barcelona: Salvatella.
