= Clara Sansoni =

Italian pianist (1893–1977)

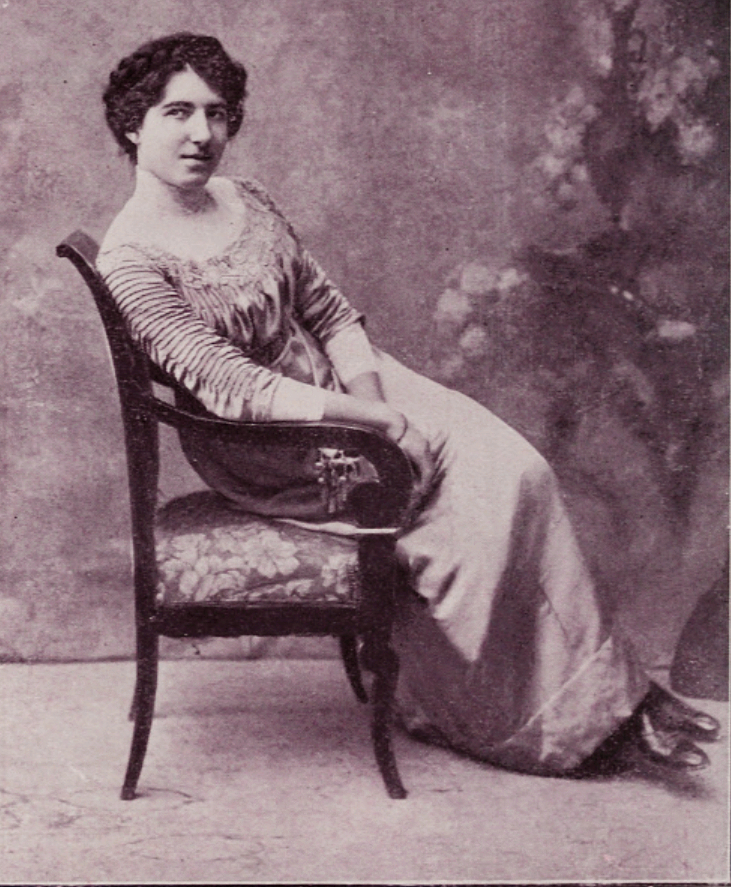
- Sansoni c. 1911
- Born: 29 June 1893; Pistoia, Kingdom of Italy
- Died: 23 April 1977 (aged 83); Florence, Italy
- Education: Isaac Albéniz and Francis Planté
- Occupation: Classical pianist
- Years active: 1904 – c. 1924
- Known for: Interpretation of Albéniz's Iberia; Spanish-French piano school (Albéniz, Planté).

Clara Sansoni (29 June 1893 – 23 April 1977) was an Italian pianist, noted as a primary exponent of the Spanish-French piano school. A child prodigy who debuted at the Salle Érard in Paris at just thirteen, she became a particularly favoured student and close associate of Isaac Albéniz.

Centring her career primarily in Italy and France, Sansoni gained distinction for her mastery of Albéniz's masterwork, Iberia. She notably gave the London premiere of the complete cycle in 1909, navigating technical hurdles that the composer himself reportedly found nearly unplayable. Her style – a fusion of the clear, floating tone of her French mentor Francis Planté and Albéniz's rhythmic impressionism – earned her sustained acclaim over a career spanning two decades.

While her international appearances became less frequent following the First World War, her historical significance as a primary interpreter of Albéniz's work was formally recognised by UNESCO in 1960. A private recording from 1971 remains the only late-period document of her pianistic style. Sansoni died in Florence at the age of 83.

== Family and first pianistic achievements ==
Clara Sansoni was born in Pistoia, Tuscany, then the Kingdom of Italy, now Italy. Her parents, Carlo Sansoni, an Italian solo cellist of the Monte Carlo Orchestra, and Anna Wilmes, a Dutch musician, nurtured her musical talent and "introduced her to the piano" at a very young age. The family soon relocated from Tuscany to Monte Carlo, Monaco, which became their permanent home. Sansoni first drew press attention after a Palais des Beaux-Arts matinee, where she performed alongside her father and played solo, impressing the December 1903 audience "with surprising virtuosity and sensitivity for her young age."

Her growing reputation led to an appearance at Monte Carlo's main stage in February of the following year, where she performed Haydn's Piano Concerto in D major as a soloist under the baton of Léon Jehin, receiving applause for her "precocious virtuosity."

Sansoni's profile grew through several successful performances, each of which was praised or noted for her "remarkable strength and brilliance." This progression culminated in her Paris debut at the renowned Salle Érard concert hall on 30 May 1907, performing works by Bach-Liszt, Beethoven, Grieg and Albéniz "at the age of thirteen."

== Pupil of Isaac Albéniz and Francis Planté ==
After Sansoni's Paris debut in 1907, Albert Diot, director of the French music magazine Le Courrier musical, praised the "admirable guidance" she received from Albéniz. Diot believed a "bright future" awaited Sansoni if she continued her studies under Albéniz. He credited Albéniz's teaching for her artistic growth. According to Diot, this distinguished her from those "... «virtuoses prodiges» ... pseudo-artists who mindlessly repeat the tricks they were taught by their professors." He noted, her technical and musical skills were everything "one could wish for in a pianist, in an artist of her age: excellent technique, full of clarity and precision... a sense of rhythm quite unique in a girl of barely fourteen; an exact understanding of the form and general line of the works she interprets; a lovely tone; and finally, true mastery."

The exact date when Sansoni began studying with Albéniz is unknown, but it occurred during the period when Albéniz spent his "winters in Nice," France, near Monte Carlo – typically of the years preceding her 1906 Paris debut. Although Albéniz was reportedly "indifferent" to teaching at this period of his life, Sansoni became his "favourite student, his «little monkey», as he called her." While studying with him, and during the years leading up to and following her debut, Albéniz composed Iberia, whose technical demands exceeded his own. He himself was "almost unable to play it", yet Sansoni mastered them. It was also during this period that he introduced her to the French music scene. Their student-teacher relationship ended with Albéniz's death on 18 May 1909.

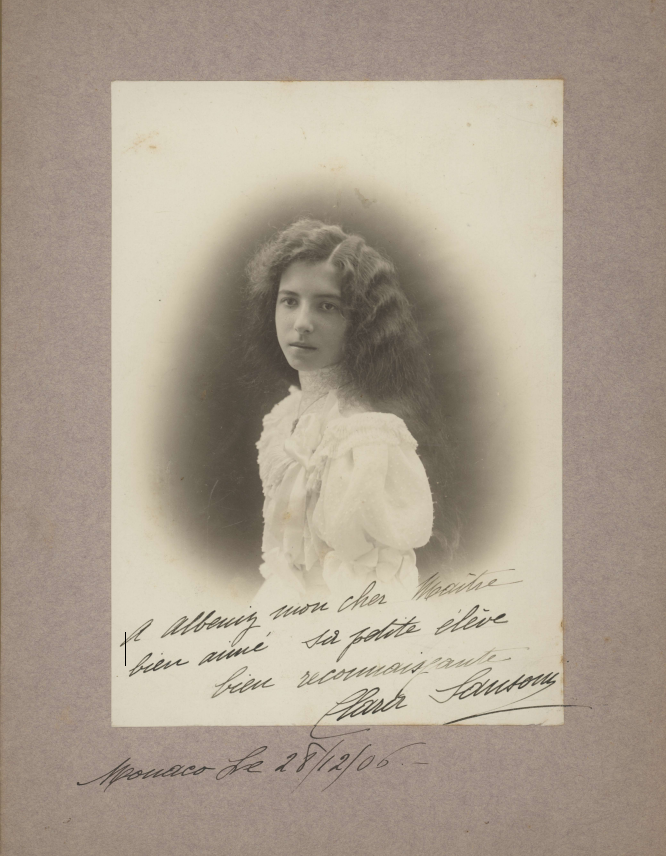
Sansoni, 1906

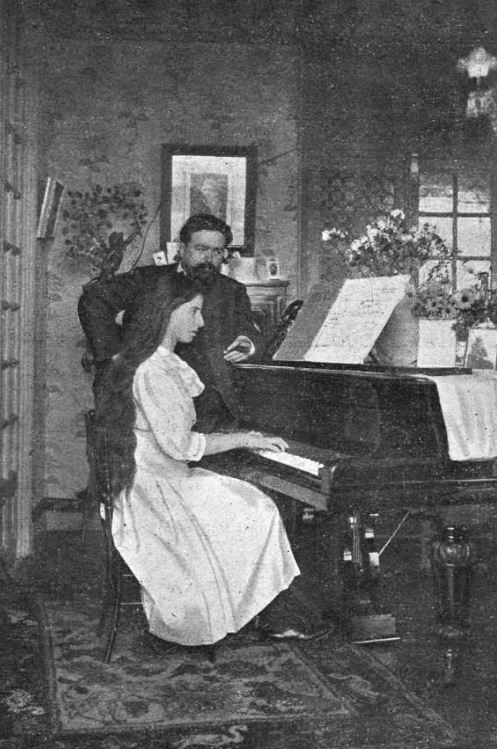
Sansoni and Albéniz in Feminal, 1911

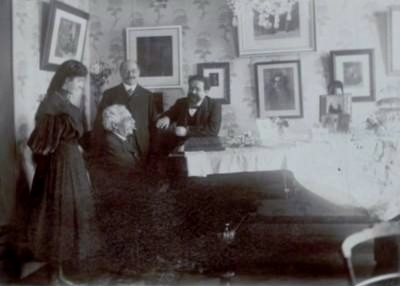
Sansoni, Jehin, Fauré and Albéniz, c. 1900

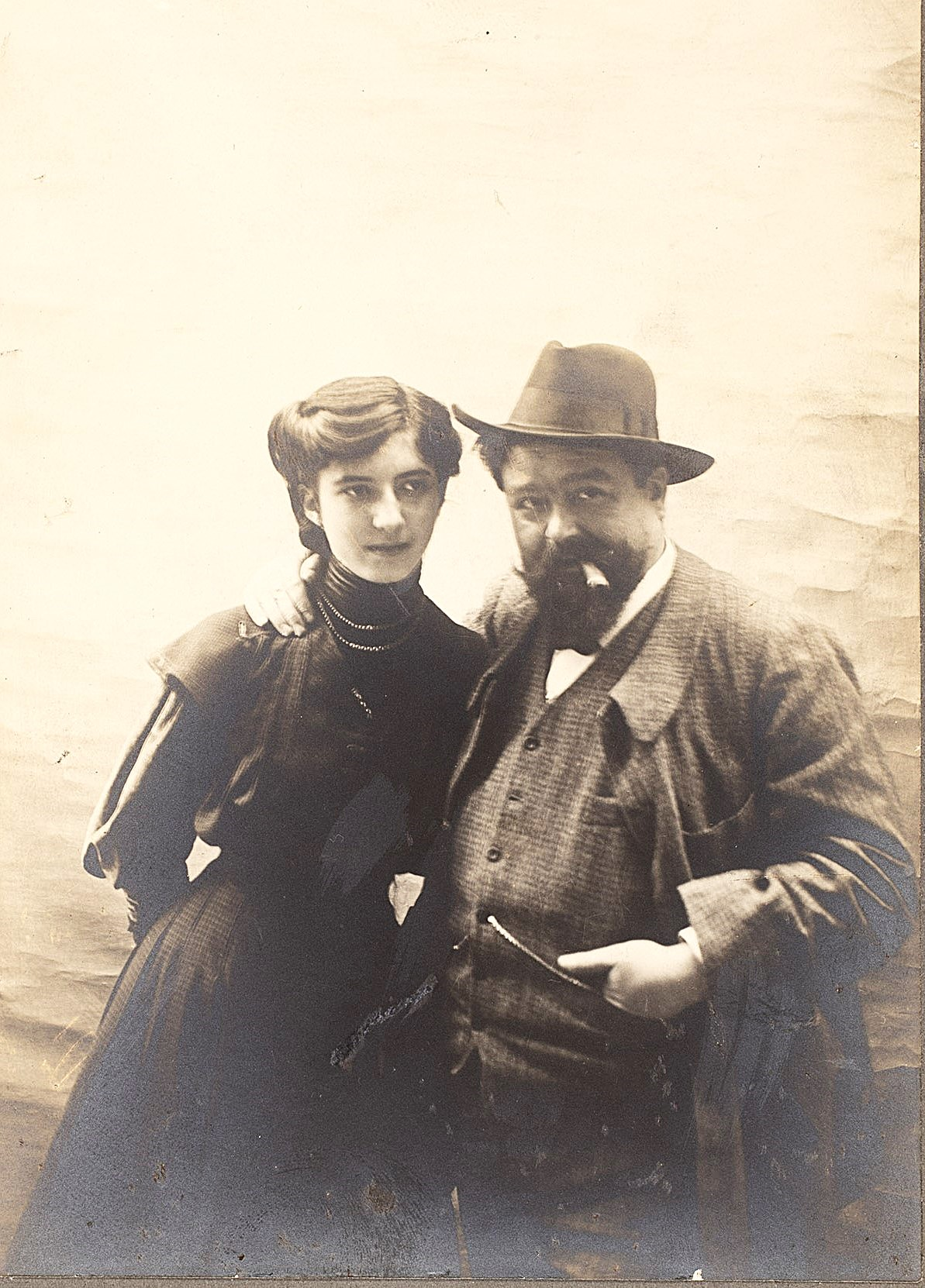
Sansoni and Albéniz, 1909

Sansoni also "took Planté's advice," who was "considered ... the foremost French pianist" at the end of the 19th century. The exact period of her studies is unknown, but his high regard for her and Albéniz is evident in a letter to French composer and music critic Henri Collet on the occasion of Albéniz's death: "One of his pupils, undoubtedly the most brilliant, Clara Sansoni, ... preserves with deep reverence the memory of her master, to whom she pays such great honor... ."

== Career ==
From 1906 onward, Sansoni performed regularly, primarily in Italy and Paris. While her repertoire spanned the standard piano literature, she held a particular affinity for Albéniz's Iberia.

She initially presented this four-volume "suite of impressionistic pieces" in excerpts across various stages, eventually performing it as a complete cycle for the first time in London to critical acclaim. At her London debut in March 1909, where she performed the then-largely unknown Iberia in "two divisions," she was praised for a style defined by "remarkable clarity and precision." Following the 1909 concerts in Milan and Turin, the Italian press lauded her virtuosity for her interpretations of Beethoven, Schumann, and Albéniz. Writing in the Italian journal Ars et labor rivista mensile illustrata, contemporary critics highlighted her "exceptional dexterity", yet found her most "aesthetically appealing" quality to be her "clear and cheerful simplicity." In contrast, her performance of the "piano poem Iberia" was seen as a "dual revelation of both pianist and composer. Albéniz's originality – found in his unusual rhythms, timbres, and rapid transitions from Scapigliatura to the Classical style – was rendered by Sansoni with both courage and affection". In February 1911, Sansoni performed Iberia in Barcelona, "after having previously surprised and enchanted France, Italy, England, and Belgium with it." The feminist Catalan magazine Feminal announced her upcoming recital in anticipation of Sansoni's "most perfect interpretation of Isaac Albéniz's work." (Note: Excerpt from the original quote in Catalan, women's magazine Feminal, 29 January 1911, issue 46, from the provider, see:)

Throughout a career spanning two decades, Sansoni continued to receive widespread acclaim, earning a reputation as a "magnificent performer and interpreter." In the mid-1920s, Sansoni ceased her international performances for unknown reasons. Prior to this, her concerts had already become less frequent. This was presumably due to the travel restrictions of the First World War and its long-term effects, and reflected Sansoni's gradual withdrawal from concert halls.

In 1960, she was mentioned in the UNESCO Bulletin No. 357 in honour of Albéniz. The bulletin listed her alongside prominent French pianists Marguerite Long, Blanche Selva, and Alfred Cortot, as well as Spanish virtuosos Joaquín Malats and Ricardo Viñes. These figures "were fascinated by the charm of his music and were the first to appreciate his genius and the meaning of his work." (Note: Snipp from the bulletin, which is not available in digital form in the UNESCO archives, see:) While a private recording of works by Chopin, Beethoven and Albéniz from 1971 serves as a document of her piano style many years after the peak of her career, (Note: Private recording from the family archives and recorded when the pianist was 78 years old, see:) no other recordings are known. Sansoni died in Florence on 23 April 1977.

== Impact and legacy ==
For her contemporaries, such as the German music critic and composer Walter Niemann, Sansoni represented the excellence of the "Spanish-French school (Albéniz, Planté)."

Albéniz and Enrique Granados ushered in the "golden age" of Spanish piano music during the late 19th and early 20th centuries, turning away from the musical dominance of "Italianism." They wove guitar techniques and folk rhythms into their piano compositions. (Note: Chapter Influence of the Guitar, pp. 149, see) Planté, a main figure of the 19th-century French school, was known for his "very charming, shimmering sounds – the floating tone", which "built upon the style of Camille Saint-Saëns while simultaneously reflecting the ideals of the French harpsichordists: clarity, elegance, and expressiveness," without interpretative "excesses". (Note: For the significance of Planté for the French piano school, pp. 47 and 57, see:)

Sansoni fused her teacher's influences into a unique style. In 1924, Italian critic Guido M. Gatti described her – "a pupil of Albéniz and Planté" – as "particularly outstanding" and "a serious player with great strength."

Sansoni's historically documented interpretations of Albéniz remain recognised, particularly in 21st-century Spanish publications. In 2001, Spanish musicologist Jacinto Torres Mulas emphasised Albéniz's "tradición oral" ("oral tradition") – Sansoni learned directly from him and was present at the creation of Iberia´s fourth book, Cuarto Cuaderno. (Note: Chapter on the Suite Iberia, section on the creation and initial reception of the fourth book, Cuarto Cuaderno, see) Musicologist Justo Romero, writing in the Spanish magazine Scherzo, listed her among Albéniz's few direct students who "stand out" and became friends, alongside French composers René de Castéra and Déodat de Séverac. De Castéra arranged Iberia for two pianos, while de Séverac completed Navarra after Albéniz's death in 1909. Sansoni was noted as Albéniz's "interpreter."

Clara Sansoni is remembered as an "outstanding student" of Albeniz, embodying the "Albéniz-Planté" piano school with excellence and "honour".

== Bibliography ==
- Ainley, Mark. "Clara Sansoni". Piano Files.
- "Attualita" [Attention] (Download PDF via Google Books). La Cultura musicale (in Italian). 1922. "... e infine la pianista italiana Clara Sansoni, magnifica tempra di esecutrice e d' interprete."
- "Clara Sansoni" (Download via Google Books). Ars et labor rivista mensile illustrata (in Italian). Ricordi: 616. 1909. "Scioltezza di mano ma ciò , meccanismo perfetto che in lei è più profondamente estetico è la semplicità limpida e serena . Allieva del compianto maestro Albéniz, della di lui musica ella si può dire l'interprete ideale. Nel poema pianistico Iberia la rivelazione fu duplice: la pianista e il compositore. L'originalità di uest'ultimo nella bizzarria dei ritmi e dei colori, nei rapidi passaggi dello scapigliato al classico dalla signorina Sansoni fu reso con valore e con amore."
- "Clara Sansoni". Feminal (in Catalan). 46. Barcelona: Ilustració Catalana: 66. 29 January 1911. ISSN 2604-3025 – via ARCA. Arxiu de Revistes Catalanes Antigues – Biblioteca de Catalunya (Search: Clara Sansoni Feminal).
- Clark, Walter Aaron (2007). Isaac Albéniz: portrait of a romantic. Oxford: Oxford University Press. pp. 255, 257. ISBN 978-0-19-925052-3 – via Google Books. "He seems to have remained indifferent to pedagogy, though he did produce an outstanding student during this period, Clara Sansoni. ...he actually considered destroying the manuscripts. He even confessed to Malats that he himself was 'almost unable to play them'."
- "Chronique Locale" (PDF). Journal de Monaco (in French): 2. 8 December 1903. "Fille de M. Carlo Sansoni, l'excellent premier violoncelliste-solo de notre orchestre, Mlle Sansoni, soit en duo avec son père, soit toute seule, interpréta, avec une virtuosité et une intelligence surprenantes pour son âge, divers petits morceaux classiques qui lui valurent de chaleureux applaudissements."
- Collet, Henri (1944). Albéniz et Granados (Nouvelle édition) [Albéniz and Granados (New edition)] (in French). Paris: Plon. pp. 24, 26 – via Gallica. "Le maître Francis Planté nous a écrit à son sujet: ... Une de ses disciples, la plus brillante sans doute, Clara Sansoni, partage sa vie entre Monte-Carlo et l'Italie, et conserve avec un culte pieux le souvenir de son maître à qui elle fait tant d'honneur... »"
- "Concerts Ce soir". Messidor: informations du monde entier (in French): 3. 30 May 1907 – via Gallica. "Salle Erard, à 9 heures, récital de piano avec orchestre, sous la direction de M. Louis Hasselmans, donné par Mlle Clara Sansoni, âgée de treize ans: fantaisie-fugue, en sol mineur (Bach-Liszt); concerto en ut mineur (Beethoven); la Vega, Iberia (Albéniz); concerté en la mineur (Grieg)"
- "Concerts. Mr Byrad's recital". The Times: 11. 12 March 1909 – via Newspaper.com. "... the suite "Iberia" by Senior Albeniz which played Mlle Clara Sensoni into two divisions, was played in two divisions. She is a young Italian who plays with remarkable clearness and accuracy. The work may, indeed, have never been played as a whole in London before..."
- De Angelis, Alberto (1922). Dizionario dei musicisti: Oggis Musical Italia... [Musicians' Dictionary: Musical Italy today...] (in Italian). Rome: Ausonia. p. 176 – via Google Books. "Clara Sansoni, pianista, nacque a Pistoia (Toscana), il 29 giugno 1893; figlia di Carlo Sansoni, violon-1º solista dell'orchestra di Montecarlo, e di Anna Wilmes (olandese), musicista, che la iniziò al pianoforte ..."
- De Rohozinski, Ladislas [in French], ed. (1925). Cinquante ans de musique française de 1874 à 1925 [Fifty years of French music from 1874 to 1925] (in French). Paris: Les Éditions musicales de la Librairie de France. p. 333 – via Gallica. "... Clara Sansoni, élève d'Albéniz, a reçu ses conseils."
- Diot, Albert (1907). "Salle Érard: Clara Sansoni" (Download via Google Books). Le Courrier Musical (in French): 445–446. "... enfant extrêmement douée, admirablement dirigée par un Maître ...; ... Un magnifique avenir s'ouvre devant elle, si, comme nous en sommes persuadés, elle continue à travailler quelques années sous la même direction ...; ... Il ne s'agissait pourtant pas, en l'espèce, d'un de ces «virtuoses prodiges» ... pseudo-artistes, éprouvant avec inconscience les trucs enseignés par des professeurs ... Clara Sansoni possède, à leur maximum toutes les qualités que l'on peut souhaiter à une pianiste, à une artiste de son âge: technique excellente, pleine de clarté et de précision, et qui parut extraordinaire lorsqu'elle joua Iberia, un sens du rythme tout à fait unique chez une jeune fille de quatorze ans à peine, une compréhension exacte de la forme et de la ligne générale des œuvres qu'elle interprète, une jolie sonorité, enfin une réelle aîtrise."
- Gatti, Guido M. (13 March 1924). "Music in Italy". Musical Courier. 88 (11): 34 – via Internet Archive. "The Italian pianist, Clara Sansoni, an outstanding pupil of Albéniz and Planté, made a deep impression... she possesses great technical power and rhythmic vitality."
- "Item Clara Sansoni (excerpt from Feminal)". Dones i músiques entre dos segles (Women and music between two centuries) (in Catalan). 29 January 1911. "Clara Sansoni in – Dintre de pochs dies els barcelonins podrèm saborejar la més perfecta – segons sembla – de les interpretacions de l'obra d'Isaac Albéniz ... qui, després d'haver sorprès y encantat ab ells Fransa, Italia, Anglaterra y Bèlgica, ens diràn els admirables pensaments del malaguanyat mestre.""Isaac Albéniz: Spanish Composer". UNESCO Features: A Fortnightly Press Service (357). UNESCO: 17. 20 December 1960 – via Google Books. "His interpreters – Marguerite Long, Clara Sansoni, Blanca Selva, Alfred Cortot in France and Joaquin Malats and Ricardo Vines in Spain – were fascinated by the charm of his music and were the first to appreciate his genius and the meaning of his work."
- "Necrologie". La vie musicale. Revue bimensuelle de la musique suisse et étrangère (in French): 361. 15 June 1909 – via Gallica. "Depuis quelques années, Albéniz s'était fixé en France, habitant Paris l'été et Nice l'hiver. C'est dans cette dernière période qu'il composa sous le titre de Iberia une suite de pièces impressionnistes pour piano, que son élève préféré, son «petit singe» comme il l'appelait amilièrement, Clara Sansoni faisait encore triompher il n'y a pas un mois à Londres et à Turin."
- Niemann, Walter (1921). Meister des Klaviers: die Pianisten der Gegenwart und der letzten Vergangenheit [Masters of the piano: the pianists of the present and the recent past] (in German). Berlin: Schuster & Loeffler. p. 80 – via Google Books. "Die spanisch-französische Schule (Albéniz, Planté) vertritt in Ehren die vortreffliche Clara Sansoni."
- Powell, Linton (1980). A history of Spanish piano music. Bloomington: Indiana University Press. pp. 49, 149. ISBN 978-0-253-18114-5 – via Internet Archive.
- Romero, Justo (April 2009). "Albéniz: Cien años después" [Albéniz: One hundred years later] (PDF). Scherzo (in Spanish). 240: 122. "Entre sus alumnos (los que fueran luego sus amigos) destacan René y Carlos de Castéra, Déodat de Séverac y Clara Sansoni: el primero, publicaría un arreglo para dos pianos de Iberia; Séverac terminaría Navarra y Clara Sansoni se convertiría en una intérprete destacada (fue la primera en dar a conocer la integral de Iberia en Italia)."
- Sansoni, Clara (1971). Ludwig van Beethoven, Isaac Albéniz, Frédéric Chopin (LP). Italy: Private Pressing / Limited Edition.
- "Spectacles: Concerts de Monte-Carlo". Figaro: journal non politique (in French): 4. 17 February 1904 – via Gallica. "Enfin, une toute jeune pianiste de dix ans, Mlle Clara Sansoni, a recueilli sa part de bravos pour la virtuosité précoce avec laquelle elle a joué le Concerto en ré majeur de Haydn."
- "Théâtre et Concerts Monte Carlo". Le Matin: derniers télégrammes de la nuit (in French). 12 April 1906 – via Gallica. "La très jeune pianiste Clara Sansoni a interprété deux concertos, l'un de Mozart et l'autre de Grieg, avec une puissance et une brillance remarquables, remportant un très beau succès."
- Timbrell, Charles (1999). French pianism: a historical perspective (2nd ed, revised and enlarged ed.). Portland, Or: Amadeus Press. pp. 47, 57. ISBN 978-1-57467-045-5 – via Internet Archive.
- Torres Mulas, Jacinto (2001). "Chapter on the Suite Iberia". Catálogo sistemático descriptivo de las obras musicales de Isaac Albéniz [Systematic descriptive catalogue of the musical works of Isaac Albéniz]. Madrid: Instituto de Bibliografía Musical. ISBN 978-84-607-2854-2.
- "Unitat Documental Simple 28 December 1906 - Retrat de Clara Sansoni" [Simple Documentary Unit 28 December 1906 - Portrait of Clara Sanson]. Archive of the Barcelona Music Museum (in French) – via AtomM. "A Albéniz mon cher Maitre bien aimé sa petite élève bien reconnaissante Clara Sansoni"

== Further reading & external sources ==
Media related to Clara Sansoni at Wikimedia Commons

- Ainley, Mark. "Clara Sansoni". Piano Files.
- "Clara Sansoni". Feminal (in Catalan). 46. Barcelona: Ilustració Catalana: 66. 29 January 1911. ISSN 2604-3025 – via ARCA. Arxiu de Revistes Catalanes Antigues – Biblioteca de Catalunya (Search: Clara Sansoni Feminal).
- Johansson, Christian (16 February 2026). "Clara Sansoni". Classical Pianists.
