= Agnès Armengol =

Spanish painter (1852-1934)

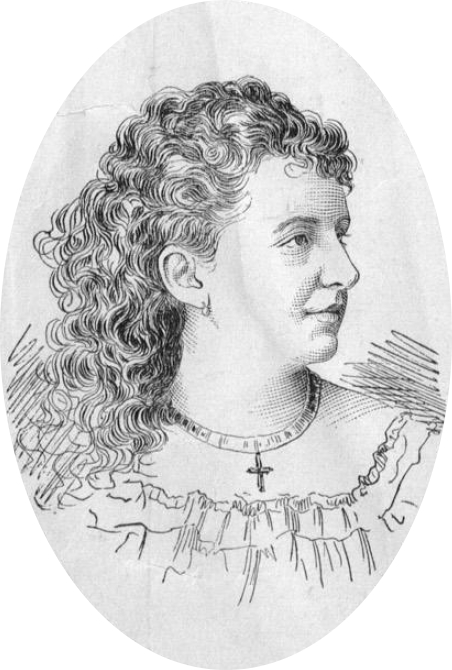
Agnès Armengol i Altayó (1879)

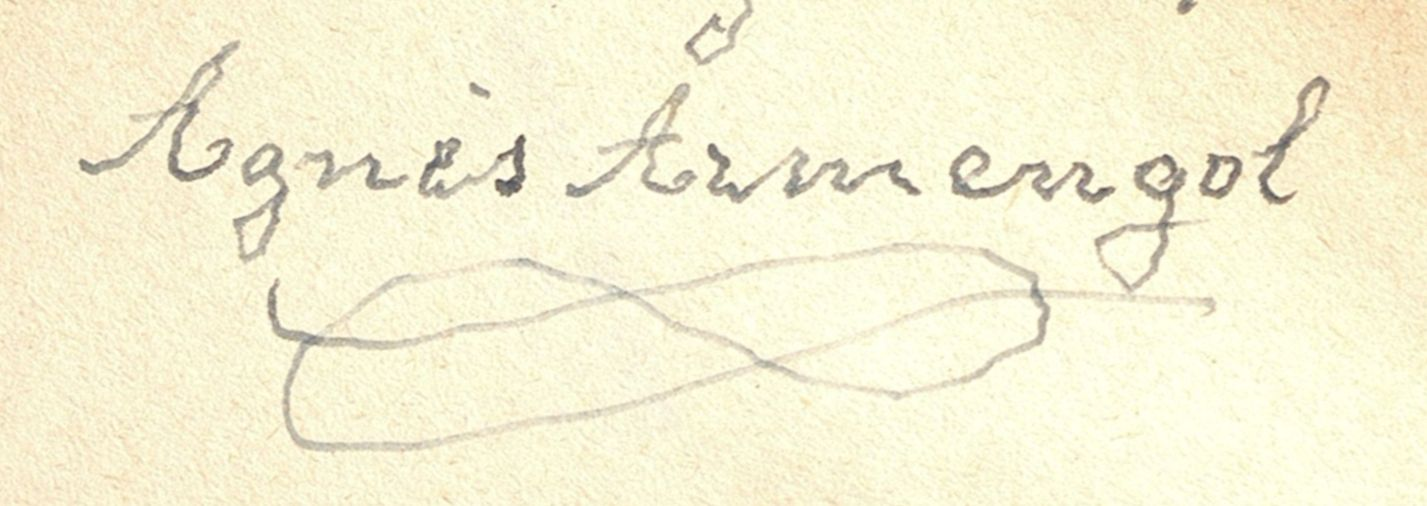
signature

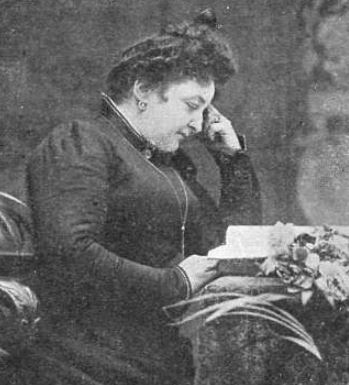
Agnès Armengol de Badia (1908)

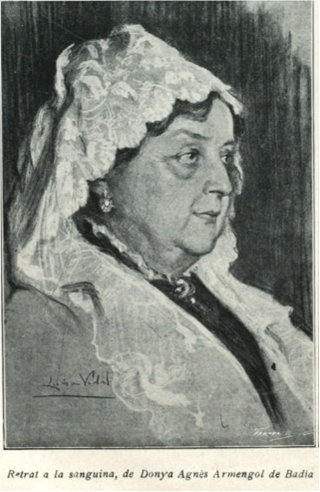
Armengol's portrait by Lluïsa Vidal (1914)

Agnès Armengol i Altayó (also known as Agnès Armengol de Badia; pseudonym, Graziella; Sabadell, August 1852 - Sabadell, 30 January 1934) was a Spanish writer, pianist, composer, promoter of women's participation in the Catalanist movement.

== Early life and education ==
The daughter of a family of textile manufacturers, her education began at Les Escolàpies in Sabadell before continuing her studies in Barcelona and at the Occitan boarding school Pension Catalane, in Castres. During these years, she trained in music education and began to show her talents as a writer, musician and composer.

== Career ==
She signed his first musical compositions with the pseudonym "Graziella", inspired by the name of one of her favorite works, the romantic novel Graziella (1849), by Alphonse de Lamartine . With this name, Armengol entered several music competitions, where she won some prizes. She is especially remembered for Suspirs, which won a prize in a musical competition in Chicago in 1893.

Armengol published some poems in various magazines from Sabadell and Barcelona, such as Lo Catalanista, Revista de Sabadell, or La Llumanera de Nova York, and various writings in defense of the Catalan language, culture and traditions. In this spirit, she wrote the poetry collection Cant a la senyera for the Orfeó de Sabadell, the poem "Rosari antic" (Old Rosary) (a collection of the life, customs and traditions of Catalonia) and contributed to resurrecting the "Ball del Ciri" and the "Dance of Castellterçol".

== Death and legacy ==
She died in Sabadell at the age of 82 and her burial constituted a public mourning in Sabadell. The Agnès Armengol i Altayó Fund is at the Bosch i Cardellach Foundation in Sabadell. A city street and a school bear her name today.

== Selected works ==
- Lays
- Ramell de Semprevives (poems) Agnès Armengol i Altayó, in Feminal, no. 122, 24 June 1917
- 1912. Redempció. Collecció Feminals.
- 1925. Sabadellenques i altres poesies. Sabadell: Biblioteca Sabadellenca, 3.
- 1925. Redempció. Sabadell: Biblioteca Sabadellenca, 4.
- 1926. Els dies clars. Sabadell: Biblioteca Sabadellenca, 7.
- 1926. Rosari antic. Tradicions i records. Sabadell: Biblioteca Sabadellenca, 10.

=== Poems presented at the Barcelona Floral Games ===
- 1893. Montanyana.
- 1919. Al Montserrat.
- 1919. Na Marió.
- 1926. San Josep.
- 1927. La bona masovera.
- 1927. La nit i la diada de San Joan.

== Musical compositions ==
- Le Jasmin (1873)
- Le Noyer (1873)
- L’heure du mystere (1873)
- A toi, les sanges de bonheur (1873)
- Chant du soir (1875). (Work for violin, cello, piano and harmonium quartet)
- Ballet Impromptée (1876). (Work for piano, four hands)
- Composicions (1876). (Works for voice and piano)
- Impromptus (1877). (Works for piano.)
- Suspirs (1877). (Work for voice and piano.)
- A une marguerite des champs (1877).
- Vora la mar (1877). (Barcarola for voice and piano)
- Ah! qui podrà oblidar ton cel de festa. (1879). (Work for voice and piano)
- Cantar. (Work for voice and piano)
- Regret! (Work for piano)
- Goigs a la Mare de Déu de la Salut (1882). (Work for soloist and chorus)
- Cançons per a Infants (1928). (Works for voice and piano)
