= Clotilde Cerdà =

Spanish harpist (1861–1926)

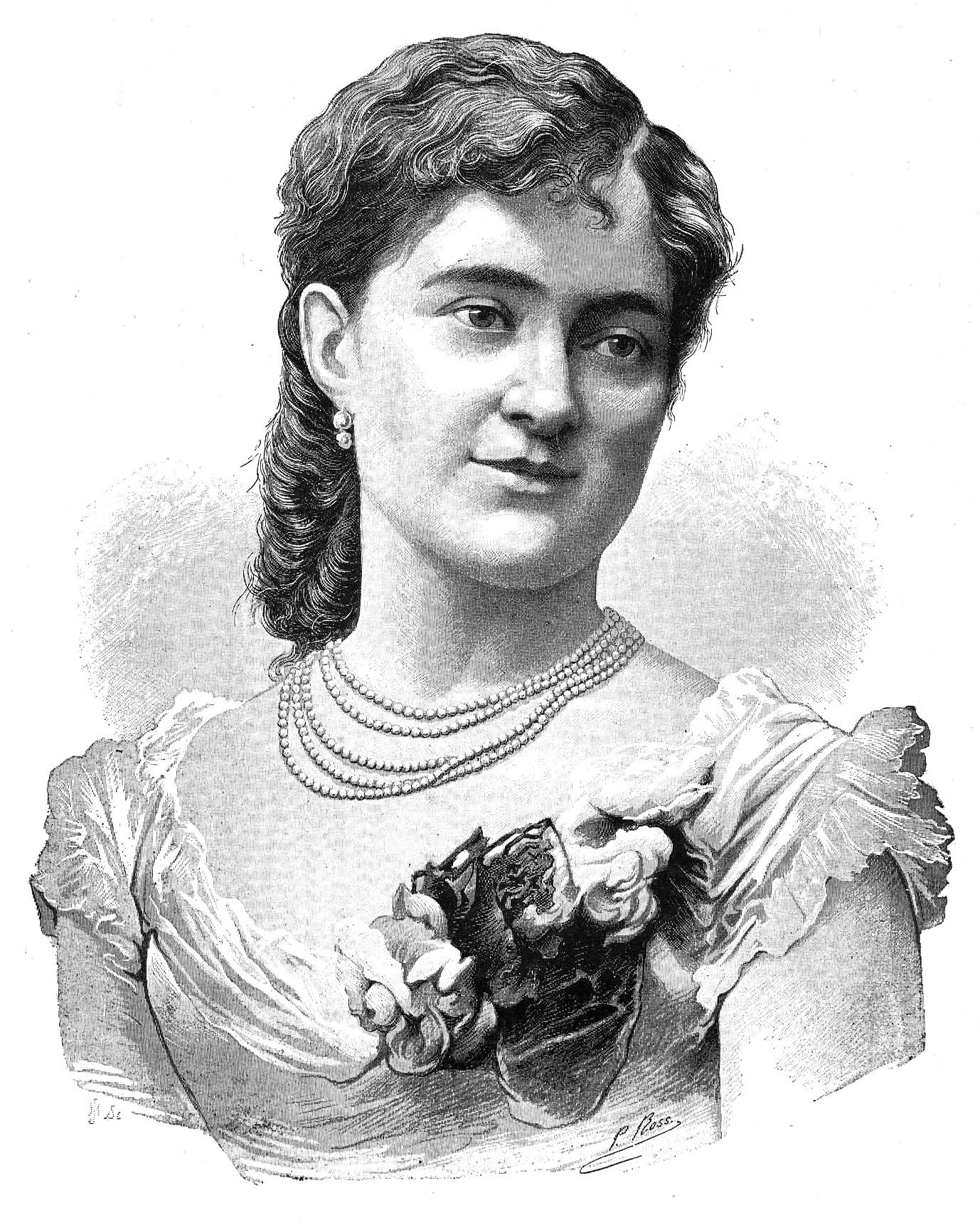
Drawing of Esmeralda Cervantes by Paciano Ross from the magazine La Ilustración de la Mujer, 1 November 1883.

Clotilde Cerdà Bosch (28 February 1861 – 12 April 1926) was a Catalan harpist from Spain. She made her solo debut at the Vienna World's Fair when she was eleven, directed by Johann Strauss II. Her performance was praised by Isabel II and Victor Hugo who together coined her stage name, Esmeralda Cervantes. She played in Europe and toured the Americas as a harpist while still a teenager. At a young age, Cerdà embraced abolitionism and took a stance against capital punishment. In Barcelona, she established a short-lived women's educational institution with Dolors Aleu i Riera. She continued to tour as a musician, taught the harp, and established music conservatories. She later worked as a journalist.

== Early life ==
Clotilde Cerdà was born on 28 February 1861 in Barcelona. She was born into the family of engineer Ildefons Cerdà, who designed the 19th-century "extension" of Barcelona called the Eixample, and painter Clotilde Bosch. After their marriage broke down, allegedly because Clotilde was born from an extramarital affair, she moved with her mother to Madrid when she was three years old. After spending a few years in Madrid, she traveled to Rome and later to Paris with her mother. She studied painting in Rome with Marià Fortuny, but then turned to music.

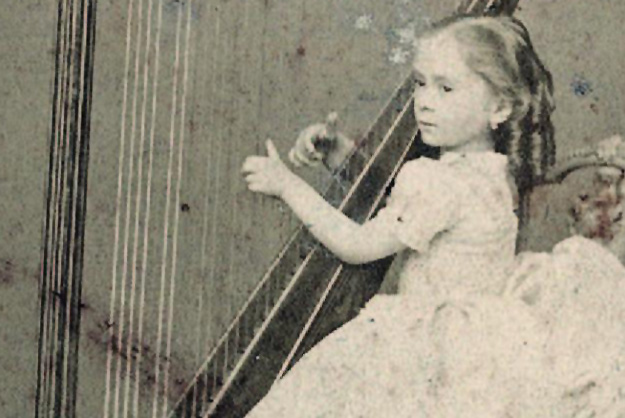
Cerdà at age six playing the harp

Clotilde made her musical debut at the 1873 Vienna World's Fair when she was eleven years old. She played a solo for the harp, directed by Johann Strauss II at the Vienna Imperial Theater. Her performance was highly praised by both Isabel II and Victor Hugo. The former (Note: Some sources claim it was the king himself, Alfonso XII, who named her Cervantes.) christened her Cervantes (after the Spanish writer) while the latter named her Esmeralda (after the heroine of his most performed work, The Hunchback of Notre-Dame). Queen Elizabeth II gave her support throughout her artistic career, taking Cerdá under her protection and helping her through her contacts.

On 21 February 1875, the so-called Liceo Esmeralda (Esmeralda High School) was created, an institution that arose under the protection of Alfonso XII, the queen mother, and the princess of Asturias. Esmeralda was the honorary president, while Felipe Pedrell served as the president and the writer Saturnino Jiménez Enrich was the secretary. Composer Maria Luisa Ponsa studied there as a child.

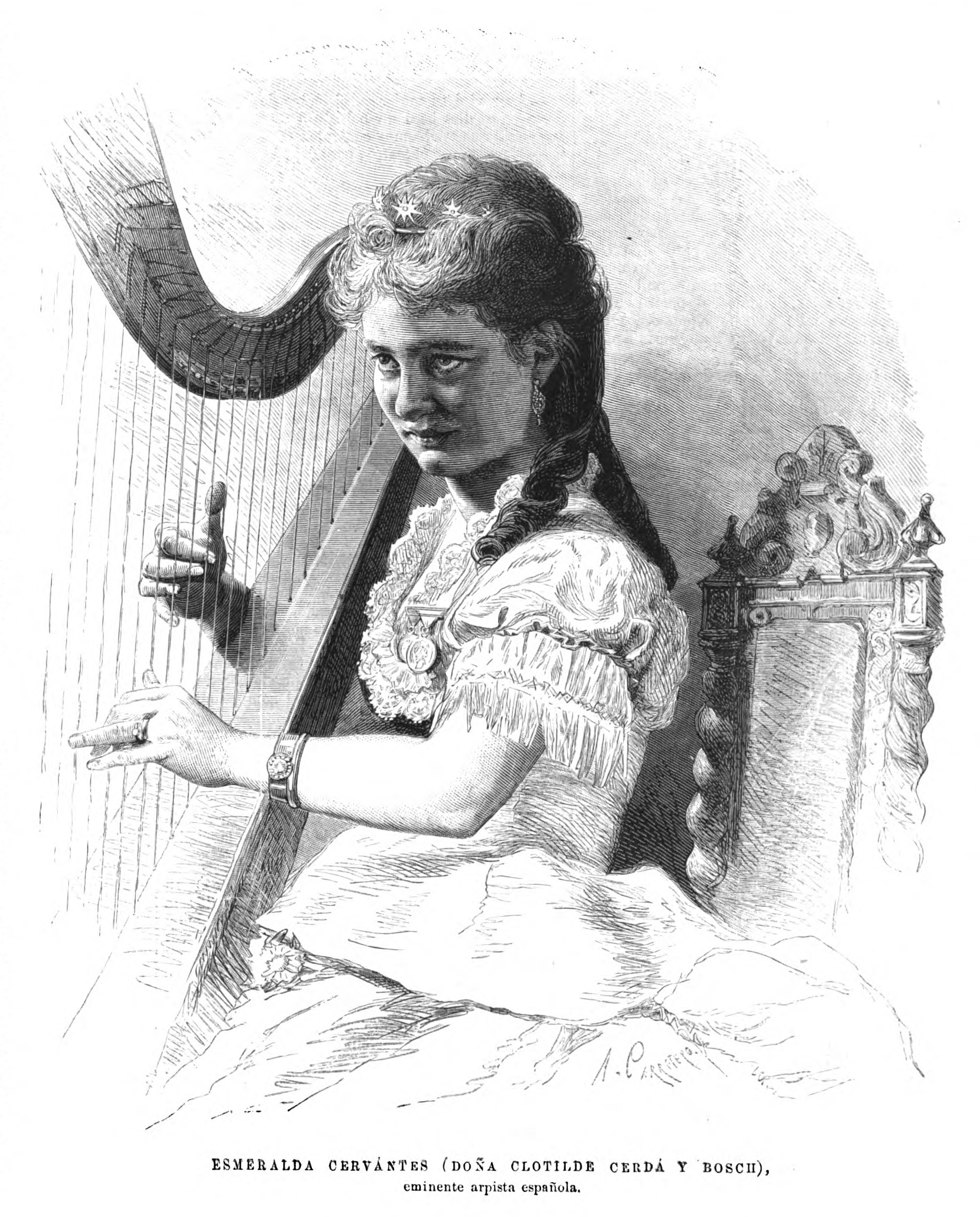
Esmeralda Cervantes, ca. 1876

In 1875 Cerdà embarked on a tour of the Americas, performing in Buenos Aires, at the court of the emperor of Brazil and in Mexico City. In 1881 she joined the Masonic Lodge Lealtad de Barcelona, of which Áurea Rosa Clavé de Ferrer, daughter of Josep Anselm Clavé had been a member since 1879.

In 1876 Cerdà was one of the main promoters of the abolition of slavery. She fought from a feminist perspective against the death penalty and slavery. She also advocated for the improvement of the living conditions of the vulnerable in a changing world. Her views cost her dearly, as powerful allies who were formerly sympathetic to her turned hostile.

== Return to Barcelona ==
When Cerdà returned to Barcelona in 1885, she and Dolors Aleu i Riera founded the Academia para la Ilustración de la Mujer (Academy for the Enlightenment of Women), a women's educational institution. It had to be closed due to a lack of institutional support. This was also known as the Academia de Ciencias, Artes y Oficios de la Mujer (Academy of Sciences, Arts and Crafts for Women), which ended in 1887. Queen regent María Cristina's secretary, the Count of Morphy, wrote her a letter in a paternalistic tone, disapproving of her dedication to political affairs instead of focusing her efforts on her career as an artist.

Cerdá continued giving concerts in different countries. Her repertoire consisted exclusively of her own works and those of composers of her time. She composed a dozen works for harp. Her deep religious convictions led her to do charity work for parishes in different countries. She received a papal blessing in 1875 from Pope Leo XIII, and wrote religious music such as "Invocation to the Virgin of Montserrat" (Op. 7) and "Salutation Angélique Ave Maria" (Op. 12).

== Journalism and time in Brazil ==
After a long trip through Latin America, Cerdà moved to Paris. There she edited La Estrella Polar (1878), a literary periodical of which only one issue was published. It is believed that it was her first breakthrough in the world of journalism. During these years, she worked for different publications, including La Moda elegante and La Ilustración de la mujer. In her columns, she dealt with topics of social criticism, music, literature, and chronicles of her travels.

In addition, many of the ideas she transmitted in the Academy of Sciences, Arts and Crafts were reflected in the magazine El ángel del hogar (The angel of the home), edited by María del Pilar Sinués de Marco.

In 1886, she moved to Brazil, where she founded several music conservatories, a harp school and wrote for the press. Later, she was in Constantinople as a teacher for the sultanas of the harem. In this city, she took the opportunity to study Turkish customs, education, literature and arts. She wrote a paper on the education of women in Turkey that was presented at the 1893 World's Columbian Exposition in Chicago.

== Later life ==
In 1895 Cerdà married German engineer Oscar Grossman, a porcelain manufacturer in Brazil. Their union is known from the congratulations that she received from Isabel II and the Count of Morphy. These letters evidence the friendly relationship that Cerdá maintained throughout her life with members of the Bourbon monarchy.

She lived in different cities, including Barcelona (1901–1902), Santa Cruz de Tenerife (1902–1905), Mexico City (1907–1915) to finally, in 1918, retired to live in Santa Cruz de Tenerife, where she died on 12 April 1926. She is buried in the Santa Lastenia cemetery of Santa Cruz de Tenerife.

== Sources ==
- Ávila Peña, Zoraida Isabel (2016). Música, textos y filantropía en Esmeralda Cervantes: una arpista de la España romántica (Doctoral thesis). Complutense University of Madrid.
