= Maria Luisa Ponsa =

Maria Luisa Ponsa i Bassas (10 February 1875 - 7 February 1919) was a Spanish composer, pianist, teacher, and writer. She founded a charitable organization, the Barcelona Musical Institute, to educate children who could not afford music lessons. She was known as Maria Lluisa Ponsa professionally, and published under the pseudonym M. L. d’Orsay.

== Biography ==
Ponsa was born in Barcelona, Spain, to Esteban Ponsa, a music teacher. She studied music first with her father, then at the Esmeralda Cervantes Academy (probably the Liceo Esmeralda). When she was 10 years old, the Barcelona City Council awarded her a scholarship to study at the Paris Conservatory with Antoine Francois Marmontel. She also studied with Isaac Albeniz and Arthur Rubinstein.(G)

Marmontel described Ponsa as “a great artist” in a letter to Catalan composer Felipe Pedrell. During her seven-year stay in Paris, Ponsa won the Grand Diploma of Honor at the Paris Musical Institute competition, as well as awards from the Paris Conservatory. After returning to Spain in 1892, she presented well-reviewed piano recitals at the Lirico, Principal, and Romea Theatres.

Ponsa married Ramón Arcasons and they had several daughters. She founded and taught at the Barcelona Musical Institute, which provided free music lessons to underprivileged children.

Ponsa wrote novels as well as articles for the magazines Feminal and L'Ilustració Catalana, which supported women's rights. Her writing tied for first prize at the 1912 Jocs Florals (Floral Games) in Barcelona. The same year, she gave a piano recital at the Teatro Español in Madrid.

In 2025, the Barcelona Conservatory, the Catalan Women's Institute, and the Library of Catalonia celebrated the 150th anniversary of Ponsa's birth with several presentations and a traveling exhibition about her.

== Compositions ==
Ponsa's music was published by A. Boileau y Bernasconi, Ildefonso Alier, and Unión Musical Española, and included:

=== Orchestral music ===
- Suite Espanola

=== Piano music ===
- Mi Piquenos Amigos: Six Dances
- Spanish Suite
- Valse Galante
- Valse Poetique

=== Vocal music ===
- Canciones Catalanas
- Crepusculo (music and text by Ponsa)
- “Himne a Catalunya” (text by Lluís-Carles Viada i Lluc)
- ”Lo Lliri Blanc” (text by Jacint Verdaguer i Santaló)
- “My Darling” (text by M. Alupo)
- “Nuit Bleu” (text by A. Karrvill)
- “Somni Divi” (text by T. de Dalmases)
