= Feminal =

Feminist Catalan magazine (1907-1917)

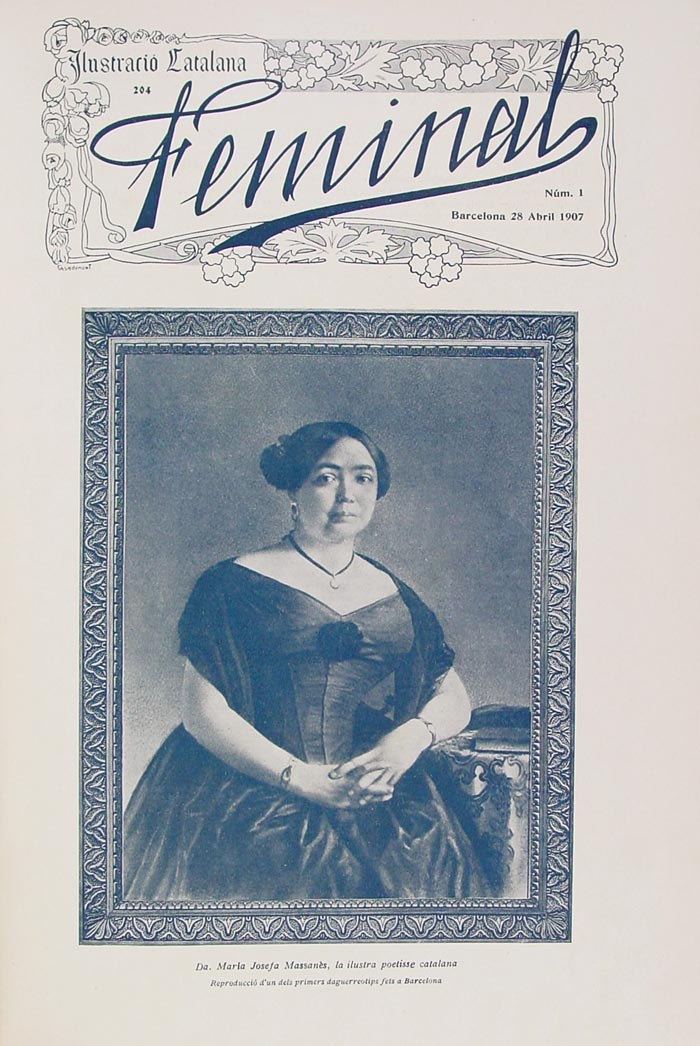
Feminal, number 1

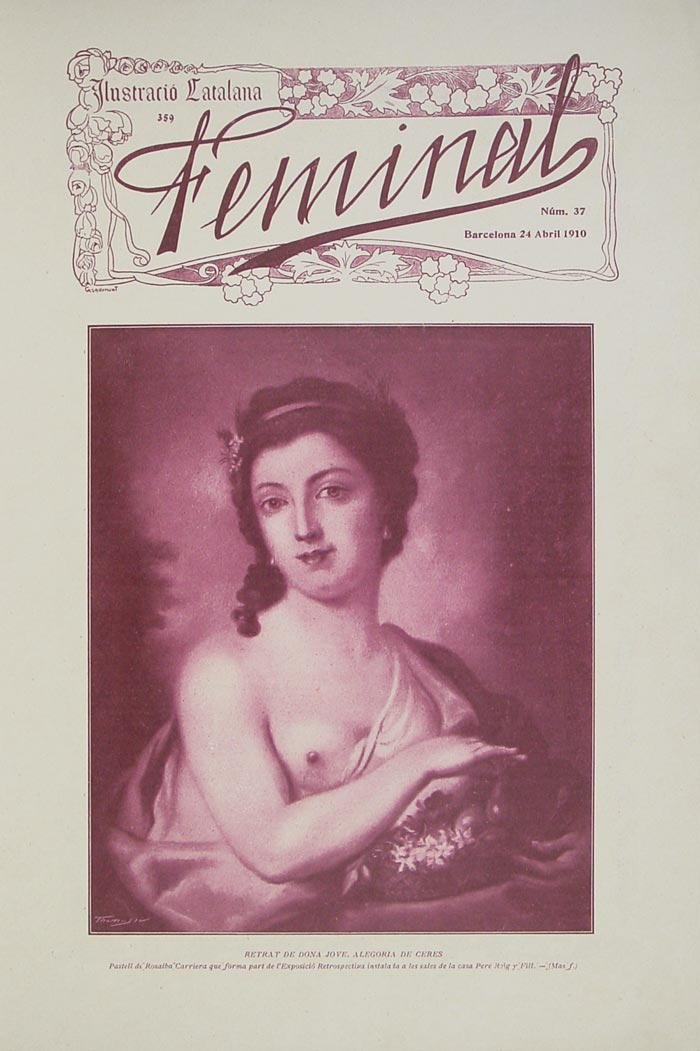
Feminal, number 37

Feminal (lit. 'female') was a feminist magazine written in Catalan and published in Barcelona, Spain. It was one of the most important feminist publications in Spain of the early 20th century.

== History ==
Feminal was a Catalan language monthly supplement to La Ilustració Catalana. It was published in Barcelona between 1907 and 1917. There was a second period of the magazine, in 1925, during the dictatorship of Primo de Rivera, but written at that time in Castilian Spanish, of which only two issues are known.

Feminal was defined as a magazine "with conservative ideas, but clearly feminist". In addition to women's rights, the publication also supported Catalan nationalist ideas. Its director was the journalist Carmen Karr. Collaborators included Palmira Ventós ("Felip Palma"), Dolors Monserdà, Maria Luisa Ponsa, Agnès Armengol, Maria Doménech, Caterina Albert ("Víctor Català"), Sara Llorens, Lluïsa Vidal and Lola Anglada.

== Bibliography ==
- Sánchez Hernández, María F. (2009). "Evolución de las publicaciones femeninas en España. Localización y análisis" [Evolution of women's publications in Spain. Location and analysis]. Documentación de las Ciencias de la Información. 32. ISSN 1988-2890.
