= María Elena Maseras =

Spanish physician

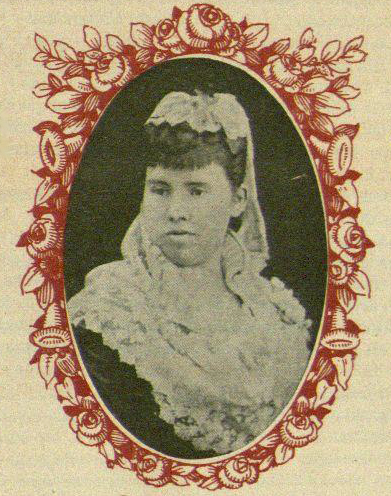
Elena Maseras

María Elena Maseras Ribera (25 May 1853 – 4 December 1905), also known as Elena Maseras, was a Spanish woman who was allowed to enlist as a university student with special dispensation from King Amadeo I in 1872; having been formally admitted to a class in 1875, she was finally allowed to graduate in 1882, which created a precedent allowing women to enroll at universities in Spain from that point on. She studied medicine at the University of Barcelona, but did not sit the last exam to qualify to practice as a physician, and became a teacher instead.

Some gardens in the Eixample district were named after her.
