= La Llumanera de Nova York =

Monthly Catalan publication in New York (1874–1881)

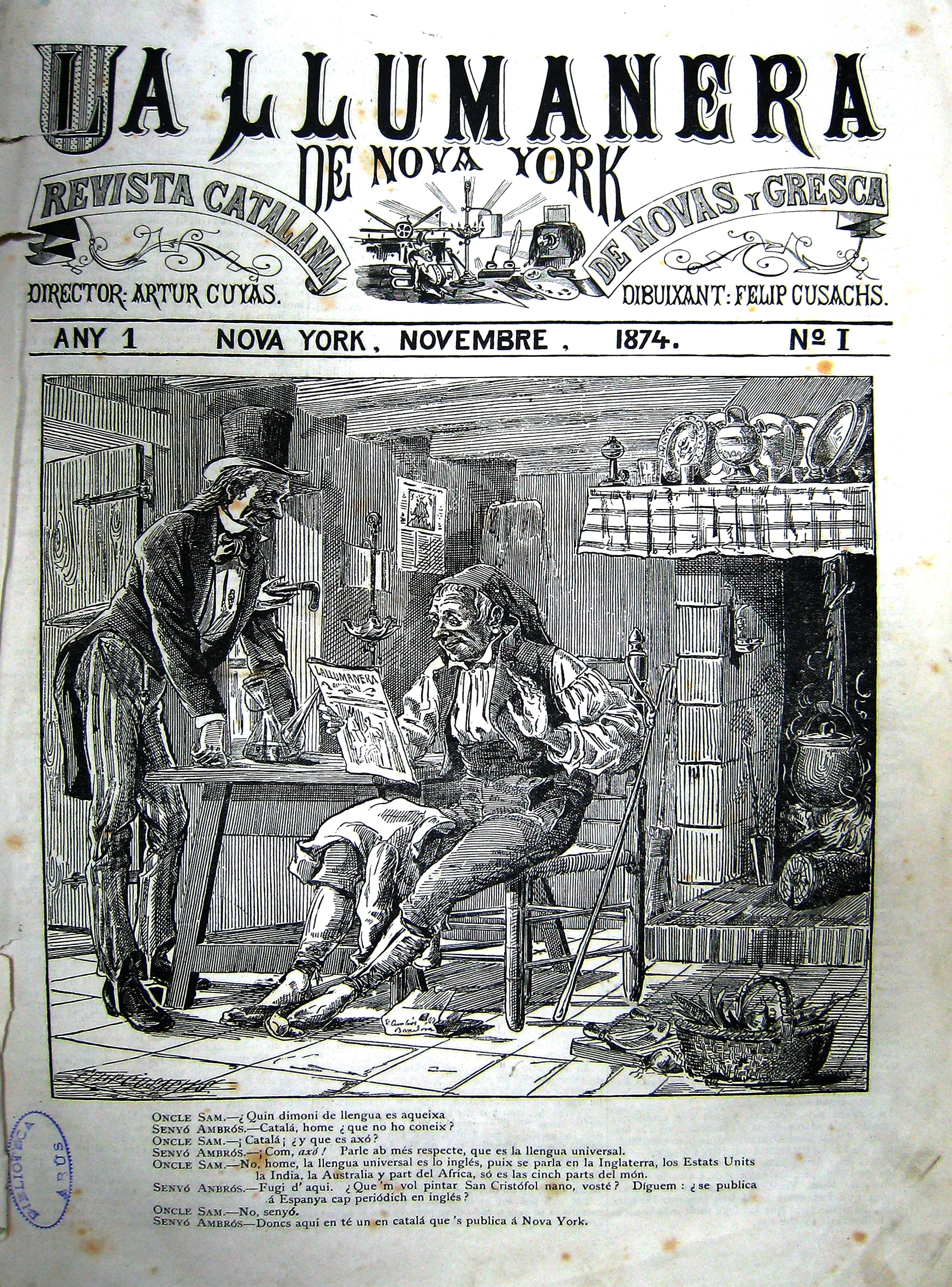
- First issue of La Llumanera de Nova York
- Editor: Artur Cuyàs i Armengol
- Founded: 1874
- Ceased publication: 1881
- Language: Catalan
- City: New York
- Country: United States

La Llumanera de Nova York was a monthly illustrated publication, edited in Catalan in New York by writer Artur Cuyàs i Armengol, and illustrated by Felip Cusachs, in a delicate moment for the relationship between Spain and Cuba, and the puissance of the Catalan Renaixença.

73 issues were published, from November 1874 to May 1881. A large number of Catalan writers and artists of that time, such as Rossend Arús i Arderiu and Joan Almirall i Forasté, collaborated with it, and even Serafí Pitarra was correspondent in Barcelona. Catalans which lived in America also collaborated with the publication, as the sculptor Domingo Mora.

It was the first solid journalist experience of interconnection between Catalonia and the United States and it featured the position of Catalan bourgeoisie which favoured the maintenance of Cuba under the Spanish domination.
