= Martina Castells Ballespí =

Spanish physician

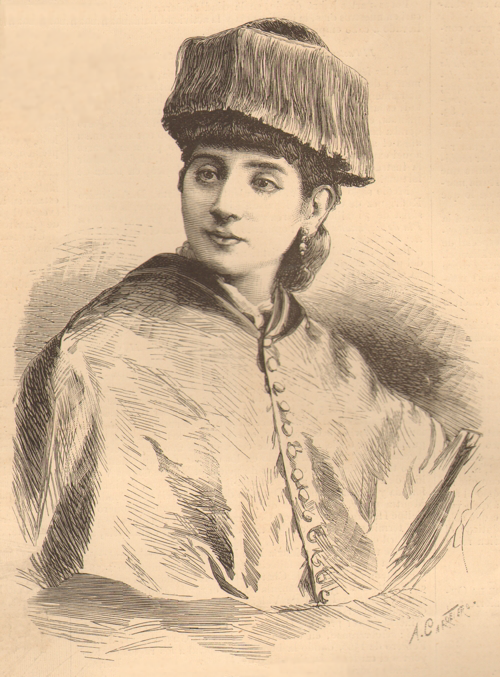
Martina Castells Ballespí (in 1882)

Martina Castells Ballespí, also known as Martina Castells i Ballespí (1852–1884), was one of the first Spanish women to earn a PhD in medicine. She earned a Bachelor of Arts in 1874, and earned her PhD in 1882. In her thesis she supported physical, moral and intellectual education for women.

In Lleida there is a street called Martina Castells Ballespí, where a bust of her can be seen; and in Reus, an avenue is named after her.
