= Dolors Monserdà =

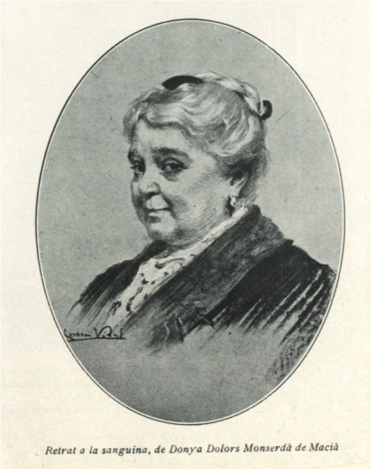
Illustration of Dolors Monserdà (1914) by Catalan artist Lluïsa Vidal.

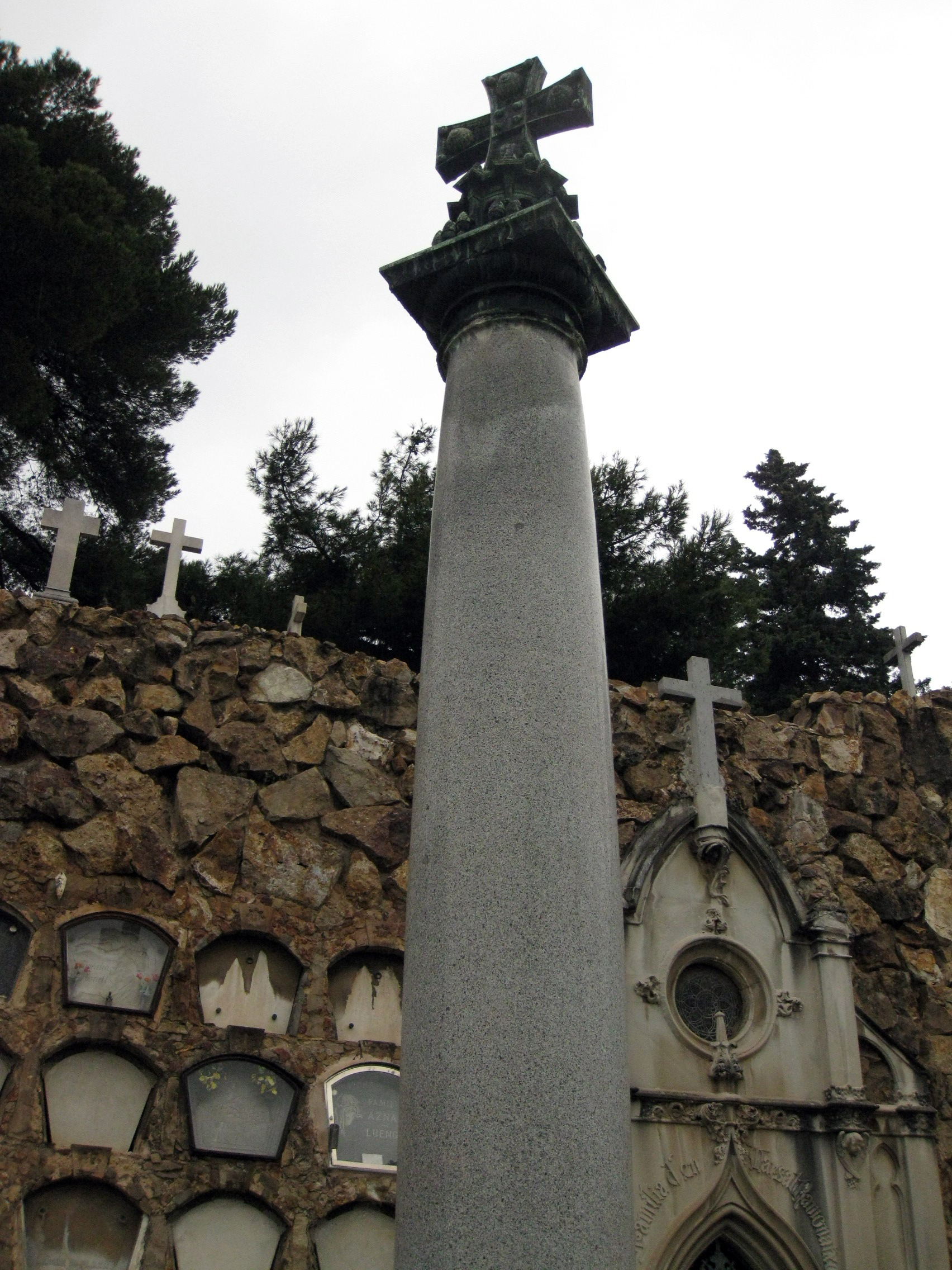
Tomb of Dolors Monserdà at Montjuïc Cemetery, Barcelona

Dolors Monserdà i Vidal (née, Dolors Moncerdà i Vidal; also known as Dolors Monserdà de Macià; Barcelona, 1845 - 1919) was a Catalan writer, poet, storyteller, playwright, essayist, and columnist. She was the sister of the painter Enric Monserdà i Vidal (1850-1926), and her daughter was married to the modernist architect, Josep Puig i Cadafalch.

She wrote in Spanish through 1875, and from then on, in the Catalan language. She was a regular participant in the Floral Games, where she was awarded prizes in 1878, 1882 and 1891. In 1909, she was the first woman to chair a poetry contest. A journalist as well, she wrote for the periodical, La Renaixença, and the magazine, Feminal.

== Selected works ==
=== Poetry ===
- Poesies Catalanes, 1888
- Poesies, 1911
- Poetry from the Floral Games

- Qui ets?, (1916, 1917)
- He fet bé! (Propòsits d'enamorats), (1916, 1917)
- Adéu a la poesia, (1916, 1919)
- Flors de Natzareth, (1916, 1917, 1919)
- Rondalles i Cançons, (1916, 1919, 1920, 1924)
- El verb de la Patria, (1917)
- La nostra Universitat, (1917, 1919)
- A la poesia, (1917, 1920)
- Del meu dietari d'Anyorançes, (1919)

=== Novels ===
- La Montserrat, 1893
- La família Asparó, 1900
- La fabricanta, 1904
- La Quitèria, 1906
- Del món, 1908
- Maria-Glòria, 1917
- Buscant una ànima, 1919

=== Theatre ===
- Sembrad y cogeréis, 1874
- Teresa o un jorn de prova, 1876
- Amor mana, 1913

=== Literary critic ===
- Estudi feminista, 1909
- Biografía de Na Josepa Massanés i Dalmau, 1915
- Tasques socials, 1916
