= Francesca Bonnemaison i Farriols =

Spanish educator

Francesca Bonnemaison
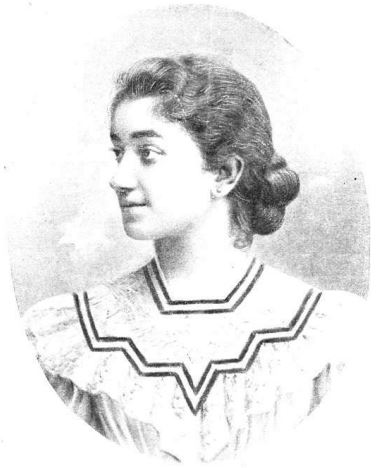
- Born: Francesca Bonnemaison i Farriols; 12 April 1872; Barcelona
- Died: 1949
- Occupation: Librarian
- Known for: Promoting female education

Francesca Bonnemaison i Farriols (12 April 1872 – 1949) was a Spanish Catalan educator and promoter of female education in Catalonia. She established Biblioteca Popular de la Dona (lit. Popular Library of Women), first library exclusively for women in Europe, in Barcelona in 1909.

== Early life ==
Bonnemaison was born on 12 April 1872 in Barcelona to father of French origin and Catalan mother. Her father was an affluent businessman. She was given a strong religious upbringing and learnt different languages, painting and music in her early life.

In 1893, at the age of 21, she married Narcís Verdaguer i Callís, a lawyer and politician. She collaborated with him at his law firm.

== Female education ==
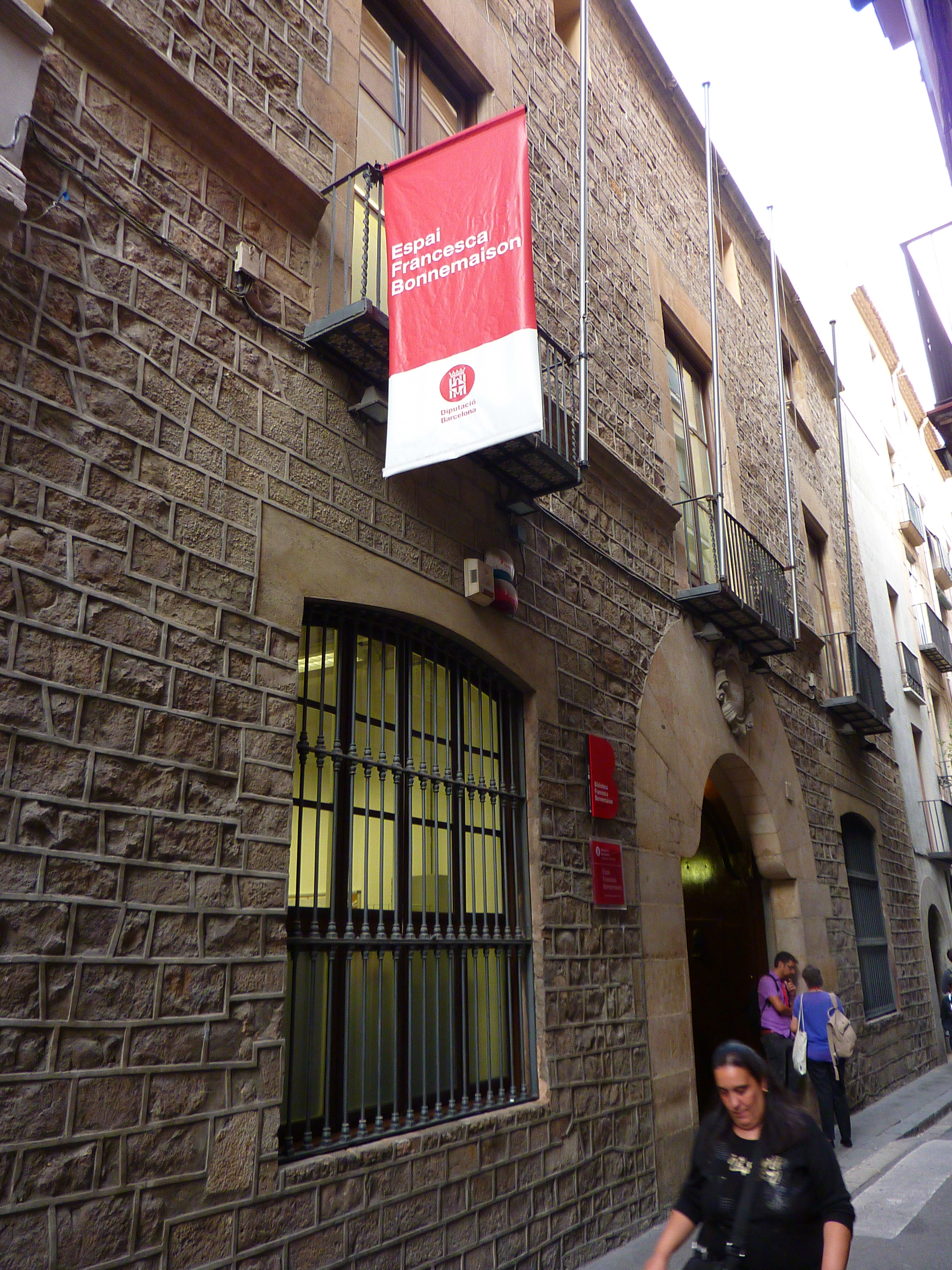
Francesca Bonnemaison Centre in Barcelona

Bonnemaison devised a project, Women's Popular Library and the Culture Institute, in 1909 to provide opportunity to single, working-class women to get education. She established first library exclusively for women in Europe, Biblioteca Popular de la Dona (which was rechristened Biblioteca Francesca Bonnemaison), at Sant Pere, Santa Caterina i la Ribera, Barcelona.
