= Joan Giné i Partagàs =

Spanish physician and psychiatrist

Juan Giné y Partagás
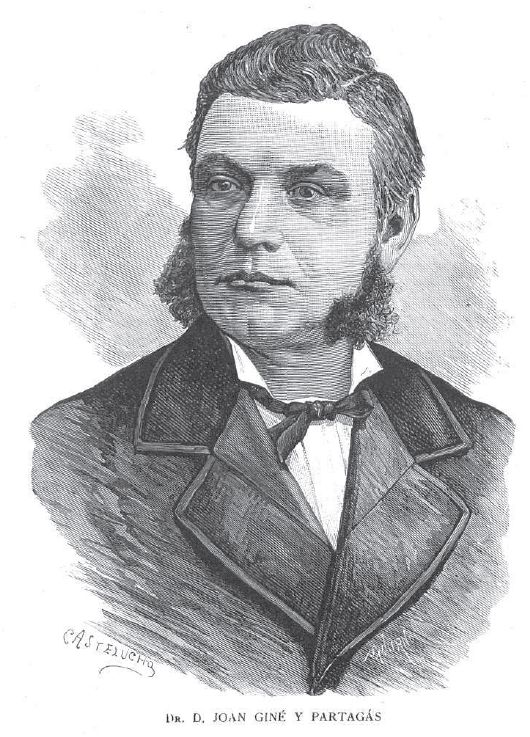
- Born: November 18, 1836
- Died: February 27, 1903 (aged 66)
- Occupations: Physician, Writer
- Organization(s): University of Barcelona; University of Madrid

Juan Giné y Partagás (1836 – 1903) was a Spanish physician and writer.

== Biography ==
He was born in Pla de Cabra, Tarragona in the year 1836. He graduated in medicine from the University of Barcelona in 1858. In 1862, he received his doctorate from the University of Madrid. He began his professional career as a rural doctor. In 1863, he was appointed as the assistant professor at the Faculty of Medicine of the University of Barcelona, while settling in Barcelona. In 1866, he moved to Santiago de Compostela, where he became a professor. During his tenure at the University of Barcelona, he held the Chair of Hygiene from 1868 and the surgical clinic from 1871. From 1892 until his death, he served as rector at the University of Barcelona. In addition to his teaching activities, Giné i Partagàs had been the director of the Nueva Belén asylum. His first recruitment was in the Gracia neighborhood and later in Sant Gervasi de Cassoles, in Barcelona.

He had been considered as the introducer of organic psychiatry, of the first Spanish congress of psychiatry in Barcelona in 1883, where national and international specialists attended. A number of his disciples and collaborators formed the first psychiatric school in Spain. He was also considered as a pioneer in the scientific and autonomous field of dermatology, until then linked to surgical pathology. His dermatological theories, derived from the French School of dermatology, were evaluated in a treatise and consequently were published in 1880.

His contribution to the dissemination, through medical journalism, of different scientific currents is considered of great importance. He is among the founders of the Barcelona Medical Institute, the first attempt to implement a free school of medicine. He participated in the writing of The Medical Compiler and directed the journal La Independencia Médica (1869). In the year 1881 he also founded Revista Frenopática Barcelonesa.

== Notable works ==
- Treatise on rural hygiene (1860)
- Elementary course on private and public hygiene (1871–72)
- Treatise on physiopathology (1876)
- Theoretical-practical essay on phropathic homology and heterology (1878)
- Journey to Cerebrópolis (1884)
- The family of the onkos (1888)
- Mysteries of Madness (1890)
