= Casagemas =

Casagemas is a surname. Notable people with the surname include:

- Carles Casagemas (1880–1901), Spanish painter and poet
- Luisa Casagemas (1873–after 1930), Catalan violinist, singer and composer
