= Narcisa Freixas =

Catalan sculptor, painter and composer

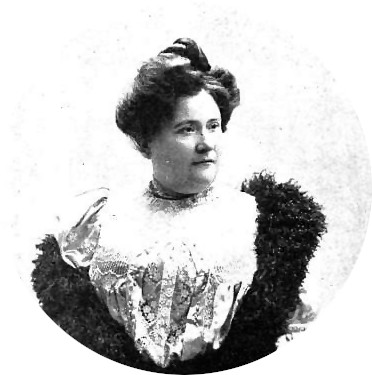
Freixas in 1907

Narcisa Freixas i Cruells (13 December 1859 – 20 December 1926) was a Catalan sculptor, painter and composer. She was born in Sabadell, Barcelona, the daughter of Pere Freixas Sabater, and first studied painting and sculpture with Modest Urgell i de Torcuato Tasso. However, she developed an interest in music and began the study of piano with Juan Bautista Pujol. She married Miquel Petit, a doctor who died soon afterward, and also lost her daughter at a young age.

After 1900 Freixas published collections of Catalan songs and nursery rhymes, and helped foster musical education for school children in Barcelona. She died in Barcelona in 1926.

== Works ==
Freixas composed for voice and instruments and was known for children's songs. Selected compositions include:

- La font del romaní for voice and piano
- L'ametller ('A mig aire de la serra veig un ametller florit'), for voice and piano
- La barca ('La doncella baixa al riu al trenc de l'alba'), for voice and piano
- La son soneta, for voice and piano
- Primaveral ('On va el Sol de març revestit de festa?'), for voice and piano
- L'ombra de Natzaret ('Sentadeta va filant la Natsarena Maria'), for voice and piano
- Dolorosa ('Rient les penes fugen de quí les té'), for voice and piano '
- Lo filador d'or ('N'hi ha un argenter a l'Argenteria'), for voice and piano
- Ai, l'esperança ('Era una tarda serena'), for voice and piano

A collection of her children's songs in Spanish was published in 1927 titled Cancons D'Infants.

=== Discography ===
- Compositores catalanes. Generació modernista (CD). Maria Teresa Garrigosa (soprano) and Heidrun Bergander (piano). La mà de guido. Dip.leg. B-45116-2008. Contains songs by Narcisa Freixas, Carmen Karr, Isabel Güell i López, and Luisa Casagemas.
- CD "Narcisa Freixas (1859-1926) Piano integral". Ester Vela (pianista).La mà de guido. LMG 2161. Dip.leg. B-23421-2019.
