= Carmen Karr =

Spanish Catalan feminist, journalist, writer, musicologist and song-composer

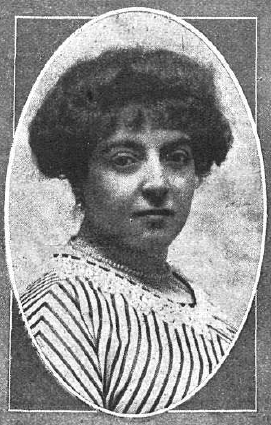
- Karr in 1913
- Born: 13 March 1865; Barcelona, Spain
- Died: 29 December 1943 (aged 78); Barcelona, Spain
- Occupations: Writer, composer

Carme Karr i Alfonsetti (Spanish, Carmen Karr; Barcelona, 16 March 1865 – 29 December 1943) was a Spanish Catalan feminist, journalist, writer, musicologist and song-composer.

Karr was one of the most ardent Catalan feminists of the early 20th century, together with Dolors Monserdà with whom she collaborated. Her feminist philosophy, which promoted giving women the necessary tools for a profession, as well as equal rights, was frequently a subject in the journal Feminal, which she edited from 1907 to 1917. She frequently signed articles with the pseudonym Joana Romeu. She also wrote for Diario de Barcelona, La Veu de Catalunya, Or y Grana,(1906–1907, where she promoted Catalan solidarity), Ofrena (1916–17), La Mainada (1922–23), La Actualidad, Día Gráfico and Las Provincias of Valencia, where she sometimes used the pseudonym Xènia in reference to the name Xènius used by Eugenio d'Ors, with whom she argued in Joventut.

== Biography ==
Carme Karr's father was a French engineer and diplomat in Catalunya and her mother, who was Italian, died when Karr was an infant. She was the niece of the French novelist Alphonse Karr. She was raised between Barcelona and Perpignan at schools run by the Dominican order in Barcelona and Figueres. She married Josep Maria de Lasarte i de Janer in 1890 and they had four children. She is buried in the Montjuïc Cemetery in Barcelona.

Though born in a foreign family, Karr was fully integrated in Catalan cultural life. She worked as a journalist, beginning with the magazine L’Avenç and later in Joventut. Using the pseudonym Xènia she began a literary argument with Eugeni d’Ors, who used the pseudonym Xènius in La Veu de Catalunya. She wrote articles in Spanish and Catalan under her own name in Diario de Barcelona, El Día Gràfico and in Las Provincias.

== Discography ==
- Compositores catalanes. Generació modernista (CD). Maria Teresa Garrigosa (soprano) and Heidrun Bergander (piano). La mà de guido. Dip.leg. B-45116-2008. Contains songs by Narcisa Freixas, Carmen Karr, Isabel Güell i López, and Luisa Casagemas.
