= Jean-Baptiste Alphonse Karr =

French critic, journalist, and novelist (1808–1890)

Alphonse Karr
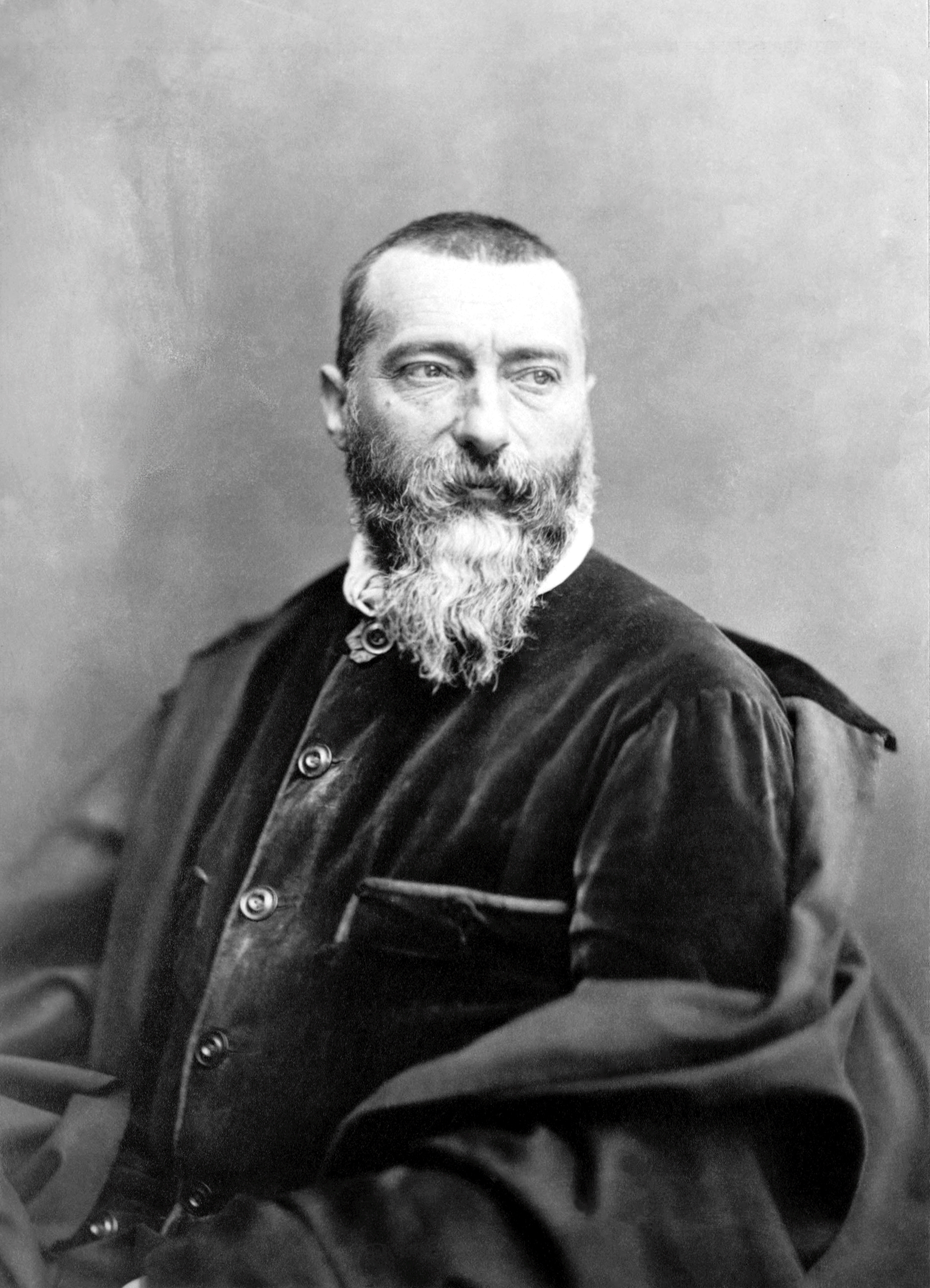
- Alphonse Karr by Antoine Samuel Adam-Salomon, c. 1876
- Born: 24 November 1808; Paris, French Empire
- Died: 29 September 1890 (aged 81); Saint-Raphaël, France
- Occupations: Critic, journalist, novelist
- Years active: 1834–1880
- Spouse: Clémentine Renard de Mentule (m. 1834; div. 1836)
- Children: 1
- Relatives: Carme Karr (niece)

Jean-Baptiste Alphonse Karr (24 November 1808 – 29 September 1890) was a French critic, journalist, and novelist.

== Life ==
Karr was born in Paris to German pianist and composer Henri Karr (1784–1842), and after being educated at the Collège Bourbon, became a teacher there. Some of his novels, including his first, Sous les Tilleuls (1832), were autobiographical romances. A second novel, Une heure trop tard, followed next year, and was succeeded by many other popular works. His Vendredi soir (1835) and Le Chemin le plus court (1836) continued the vein of autobiographical romance with which he had made his first success. Geneviève (1838) is one of his best stories, and his Voyage autour de Mon Jardin (1845) was deservedly popular. Others were Feu Bressier (1848), and Fort en thème (1853), which had some influence in stimulating educational reform.

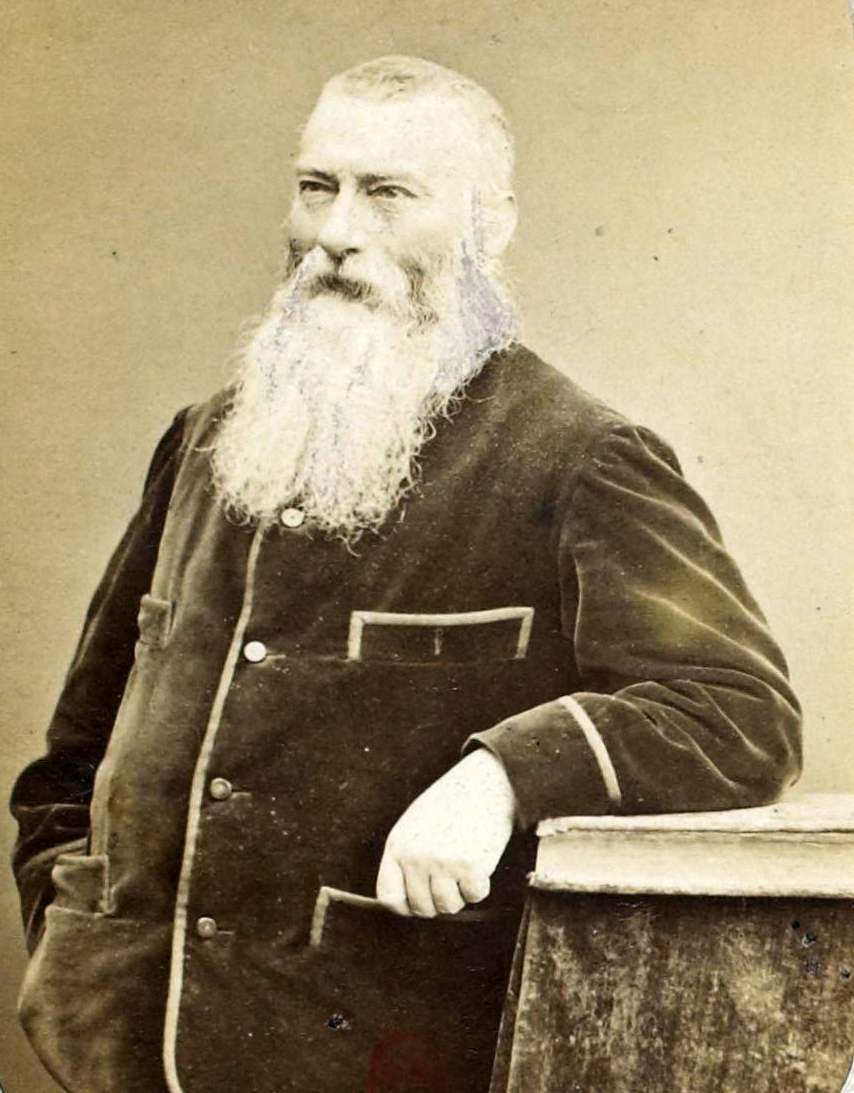
Alphonse Karr in 1865

In 1855 he went to live in Nice, where he indulged his predilections for floriculture, and gave his name to more than one new variety, notably the dahlia (New International Encyclopedia). Indeed, he practically founded the trade in cut flowers on the French Riviera. He was also devoted to fishing, and in Les Soirées de Sainte-Adresse (1853) and Au bord de la mer (1860) he made use of his experiences. His reminiscences, Livre de bord, were published in 1879–1880. He died at Saint-Raphaël, Var.

== Family ==
Karr's brother Eugène was a talented engineer, and his niece Carme Karr was a writer, journalist and suffragist in La Roche-Mabile.

In April 1832, Karr had a short-lived relationship with actress Juliette Drouet. He allegedly borrowed all of her money and never paid it back. Karr was married to Louise Estelle Clémentine (née Renard de Mentule, born 9 December 1815). They first met in late 1833, and married on 10 February 1834. Their first and only child, Thérèse, was born on 2 September 1834. By 1845, the couple had been separated for eight and a half years.

== Writings ==
=== Novels ===
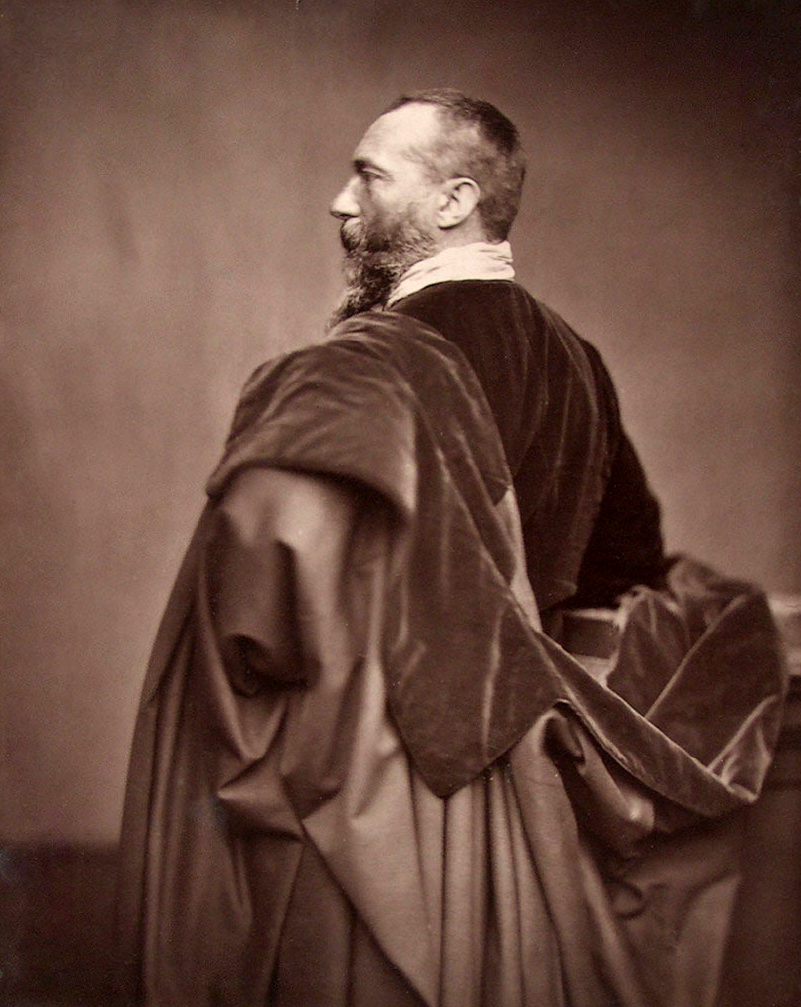
Woodburytype of Karr c. 1876. Photo by Antoine Samuel Adam-Salomon.

- Sous les Tilleuls (1832)
- Une heure trop tard (1833)
- Vendredi soir (1835)
- Le chemin le plus court (1836)
- Geneviève (1838)
- Voyage autour de mon Jardin (1845)
- Feu Bressier (1848)
- Fort en thème (1853)
- Les Soirées de Sainte-Adresse (1853)
- Histoires Normandes (1855)
- Au bord de la mer (1860)
- Une poignee de verites (1866)
- Livre de bord (1879–80)

=== Journalism ===
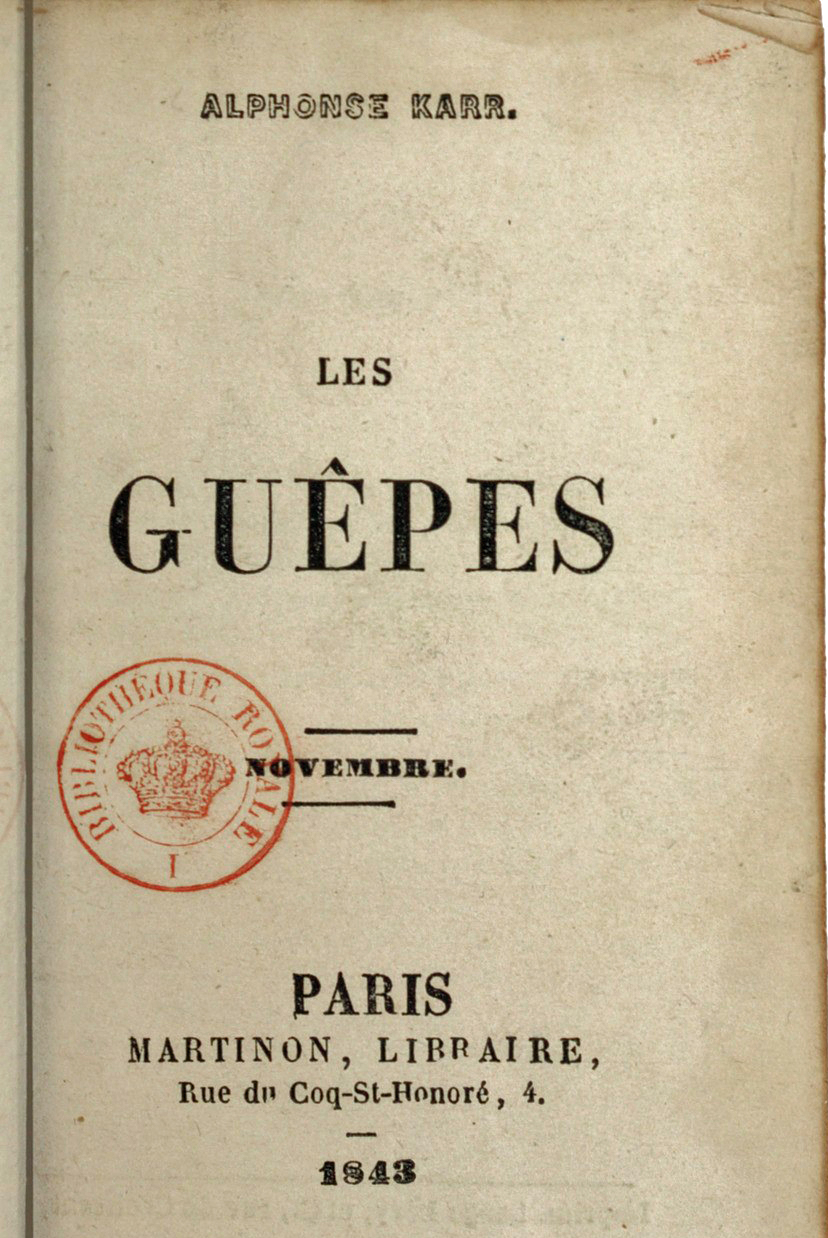
Title page of 1843 edition of Les Guêpes magazine

In 1839, Karr became editor of Le Figaro, to which he had been a constant contributor; and he also started a monthly journal, Les Guêpes (The Wasps), of a keenly satirical tone, a publication which brought him the reputation of someone of "imperishable words" and biting wit. The first volumes of the journal, or magazine, were published from 1839-43. Karr attempted to revive the publication of Les Guêpes from 1852–55, an undertaking doomed to failure given the conditions of state censorship (under the regime of Napoleon III).

In 1848, he founded Le Journal.

=== Memorable quotations ===
Karr is remembered for many of his statements, including the well-known aphorism plus ça change, plus c'est la même chose, usually translated as "the more things change, the more they stay the same". On the proposal to abolish capital punishment, he wrote: "je veux bien que messieurs les assassins commencent" (i.e., "let the gentlemen who do the murders take the first step").

== Legacy ==
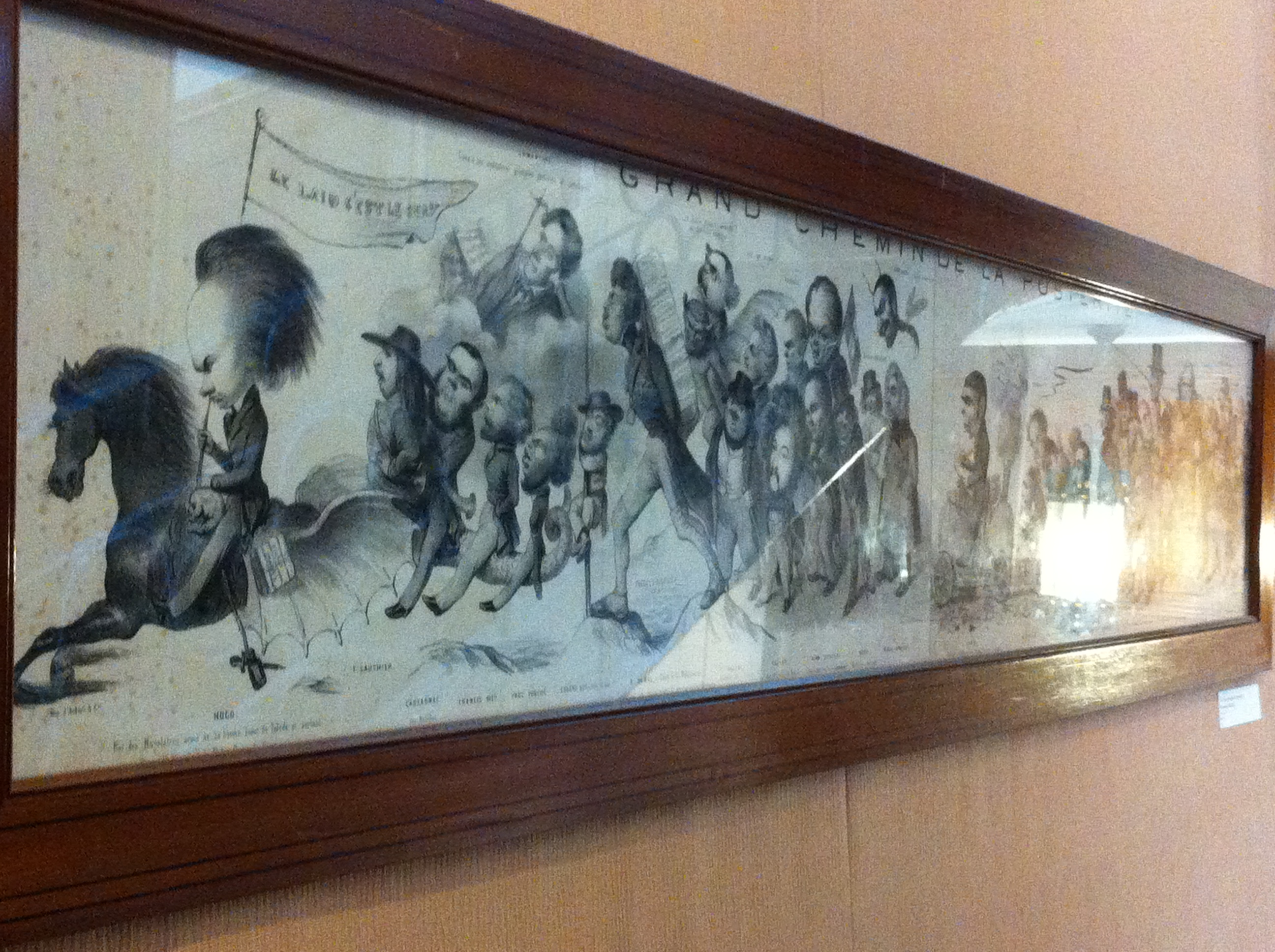
Grand Chemin de la Postérité (1842)

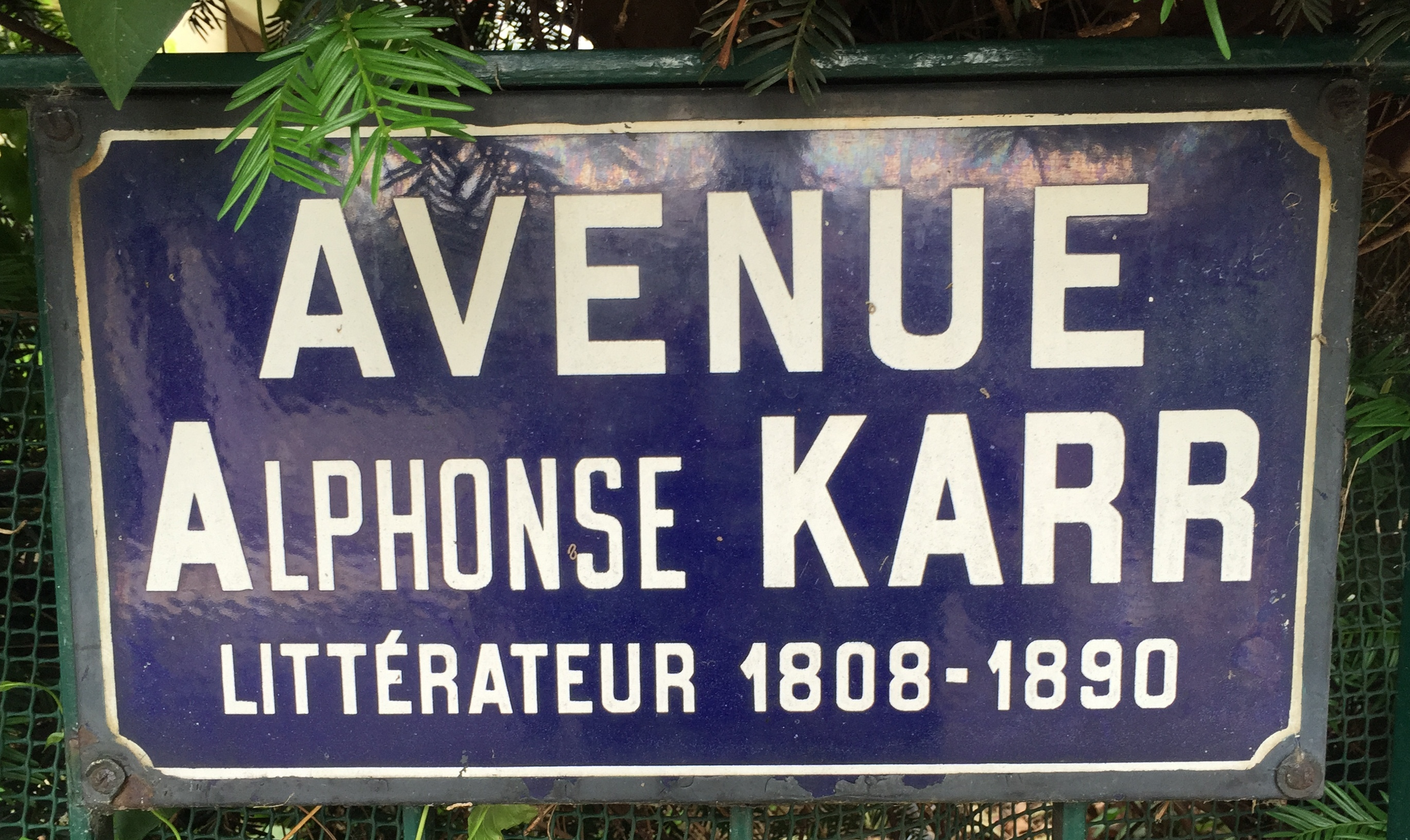
Street sign in Saint-Maur-des-Fossés

Karr is one of the French artists and writers caricatured by Benjamin Roubaud in his drawing Grand Chemin de la Postérité. Karr's head is drawn on the body of a wasp (alluding to Les Guêpes) and annotated "KARicature" (sic). One of the most memorable quotes by Jean-Baptiste Alphonse Karr, used in many pieces of media, is: "The more things change, the more they stay the same."

The short story "Les Willis" was the basis of Giacomo Puccini's opera Le Villi (1884).

The bamboo species Bambusa multiplex Alphonse Karr was named in his honour.

Numerous roads have been named after him including:

- Rue Alphonse Karr in Paris
- Rue Alphonse Karr in Nice
- Avenue Alphonse Karr in Saint-Maur-des-Fossés
- Place Alphonse Karr in Barentin
- Allée Alphonse Karr in Châlons-en-Champagne

The Collège Alphonse Karr is in the resort town of Saint-Raphaël on the Côte d'Azur.
