= Carles Casagemas =

Spanish painter (1880–1901)

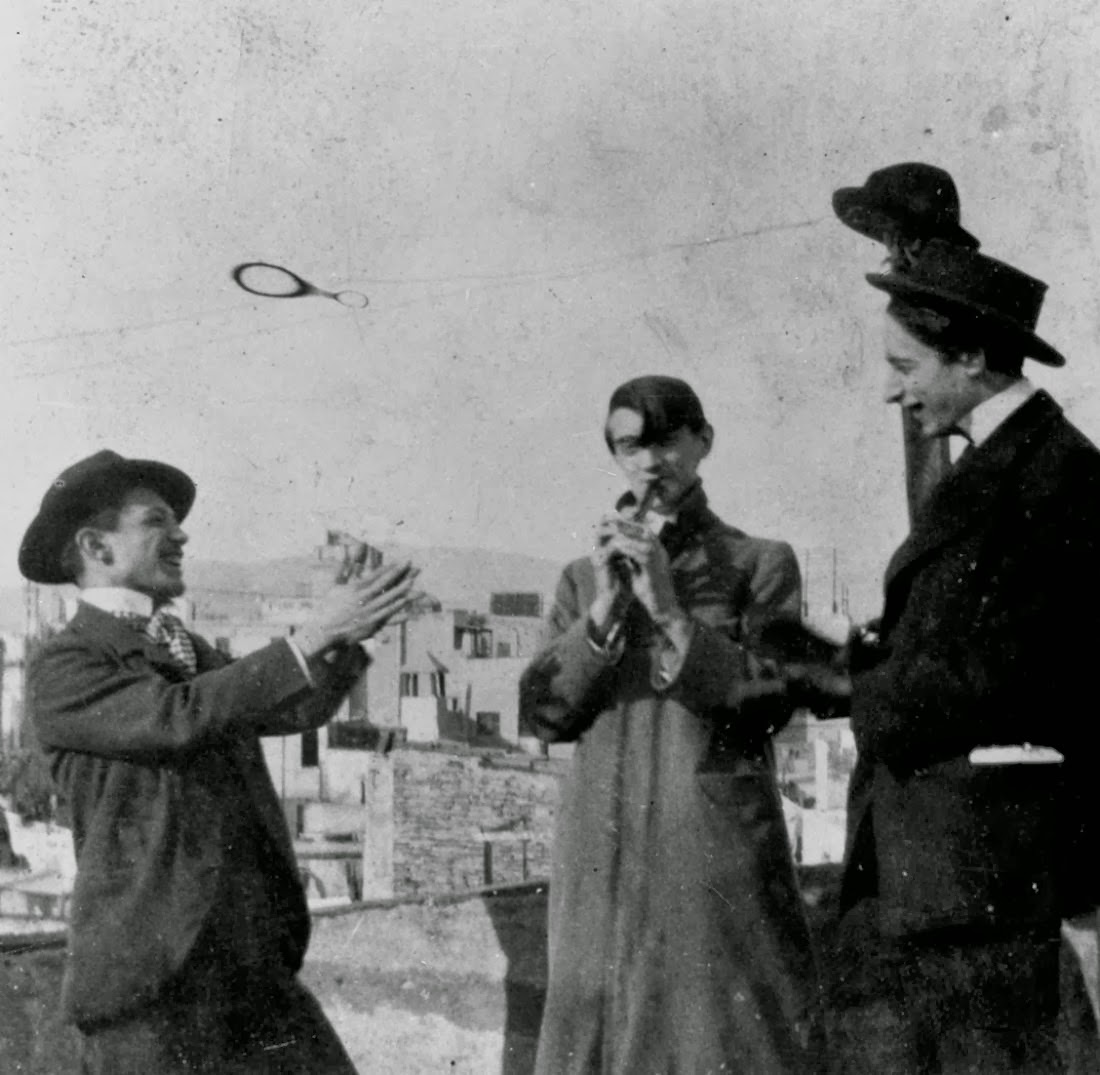
- (L–R): Picasso, Angel Fernández de Soto, and Casagemas
- Born: Carles Antoni Cosme i Damia Casagemas i Coll; September 27, 1880; Barcelona, Spain
- Died: February 17, 1901 (aged 20); Paris, France

Carles Antoni Cosme Damià Casagemas i Coll (Carlos Casagemas) (September 27, 1880, in Barcelona, Spain – February 17, 1901, in Paris, France) was a Spanish painter and poet. He is known for his friendship with Pablo Picasso, who painted several portraits of Casagemas. They traveled around Spain and eventually to Paris, where they lived together in a vacant studio.

Casagemas fell in love with Germaine, a model they had portrayed; however, Casagemas was unable to consummate the relationship due to impotence. This, along with his descent into depression and mood swings, led to several suicide attempts. Casagemas attempted suicide once more in a Paris cafe, during a farewell dinner party he held for himself. This time it was fatal, and Casagemas died at a hospital later that evening. This event is widely recognized as inspiring Picasso's Blue Period.

La Vie, Picasso, 1903

== Early life and family ==
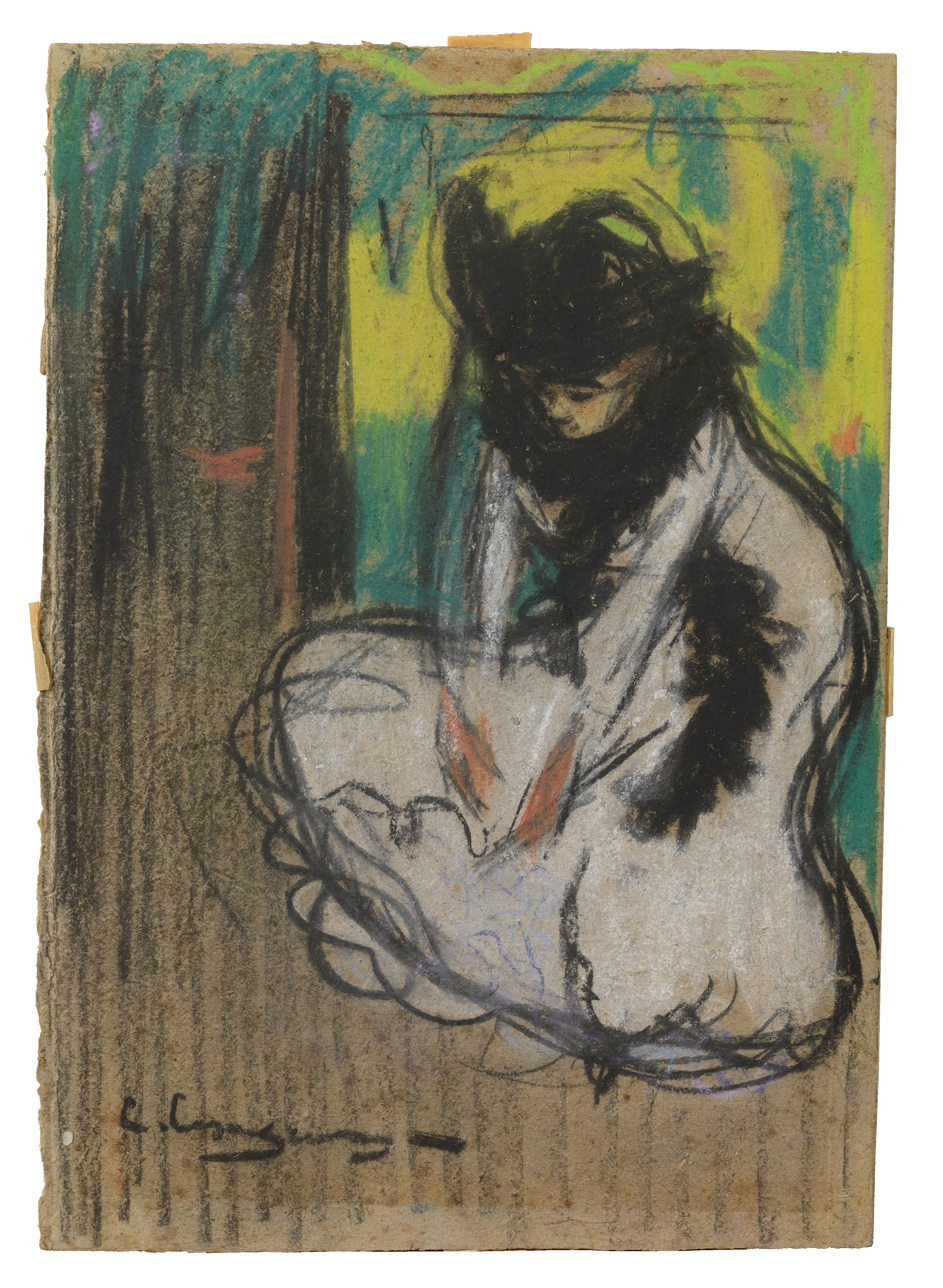
Dona vestida de blanc, Carlos Casagemas

Carles Antoni Cosme Damià Casagemas i Coll (Carlos Casagemas) was born into an upper class, cultured family on September 28, 1880, in his family's home on Carrer Nou de la Rambla, Barcelona, Spain. Casagemas's father, Manuel Casagemas i Llabrós (1833–1898), had an extensive library, spoke seven languages, and became a certified interpreter. Manuel worked as general secretary of the Compania Transatlantica and also served as Vice-Consul of Sweden and Norway and then as General Vice-Consul of the United States of America in Barcelona. His sister, Lluïsa Casagemas (1873–1942), became a well-known composer. The opening of one of her operas, Schiava et Regina, had to be postponed due to the bombing of the Gran Teatre del Liceu by anarchists. The family owned multiple properties, including a vacation house in Sitges and in Badalona, where Casagemas and Picasso spent time together.

As a teenager, Casagemas and group of friends formed the grup bohemi-barceloní (the Barcelona-Bohemian Group) and spent significant time at Els Quatre Gats, a well-known meeting place for Catalan Modernist arts. Casagemas formed strong political views during his teenage years becoming a self-declared anarchist and a Catalanista (Catalan nationalist), even taking part in demonstration and having a run-in with police. During this time, Casagemas also began abusing alcohol and various narcotics.

== Friendship with Picasso ==
Casagemas met Picasso in 1899. The two quickly became close friends, traveled around Spain together, and then shared a studio on Carrer Riera de Sant Joan in Barcelona at the beginning of 1900. Picasso painted multiple portraits of Casagemas around that time. During the early months of their friendship, Casagemas showed signs of depression, mood swings, and impotence. Notably, Picasso and Casagemas frequented brothels in Barcelona, where Casagemas could not have sex with the prostitutes and would simply wait for Picasso.

In February 1900, Picasso had his first solo exhibit at Els Quatre Gats. One of the three oil paintings exhibited in that show, entitled Last Moments, was selected to be included in Paris's Exposition Universelle. (Last Moments no longer exists in its original form, having been painted over by Picasso in 1903 as La Vie, an allegorical work featuring Casagemas.)

Casagemas also put up an exhibit at Els Quatre Gats just after Picasso's, in late March and early April 1900. The exhibit received mixed reviews.

== Paris 1900–1901 ==
In October 1900, Casagemas accompanied Picasso to Paris for the Exposition. Eventually, the two took up residence in a vacated studio owned by Isidre Nonell located in Montmartre. Germaine Gargallo Florentin Pichot (best known as Germaine), Germaine's sister (Antoinette Fornerod), and a close friend, Louise "Odette" Lenoir became models and constant companions of Picasso and Casagemas. Casagemas quickly fell in love with Germaine, while Odette began sleeping with Picasso. Despite his deep feelings for Germaine, Casagemas, due to his impotence, could not consummate their relationship and quickly fell into a deep depression.

Casagemas spoke of suicide often and attempted to kill himself at least once before Picasso suggested that they leave Paris and return to Spain for the holidays. They spent Christmas 1900 in Barcelona and then traveled to Malaga, Picasso's birthplace, on New Year's Day 1901. There Casagemas's behavior towards Picasso's relatives embarrassed Picasso so deeply that Picasso put him on a boat back to Barcelona. After passing through Barcelona, Casagemas returned to Paris on his own to see Germaine. Throughout his absence from Paris, Casagemas had been writing to Germaine multiple times a day.

Not much is known about the three weeks Casagemas spent in Paris after his arrival in early 1901, except that he asked Germaine to live with him and she refused. But he soon decided that he would again return to Spain.

== Attempted murder of Germaine and suicide ==
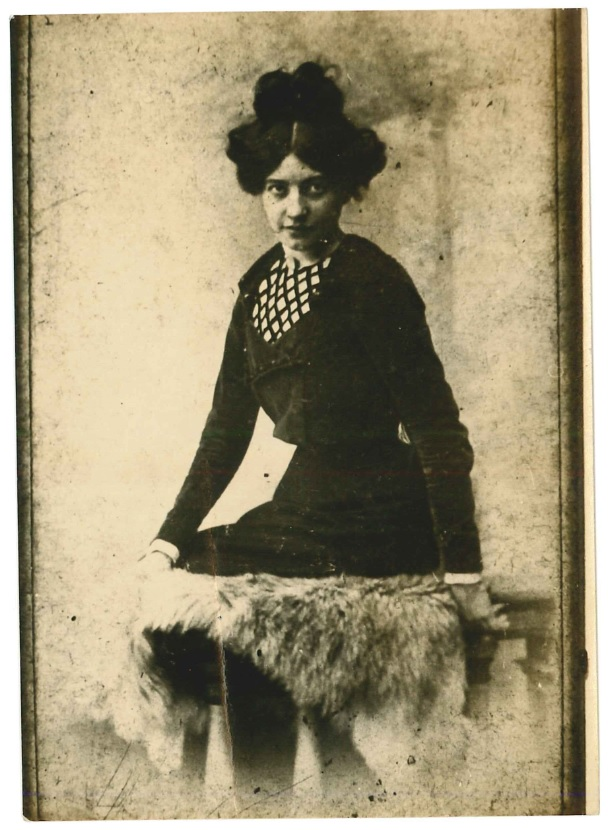
Germaine Pichot, c. 1905

On February 17, 1901, Casagemas arranged a farewell dinner for himself at the Hippodrome Cafe in Paris. He invited Germaine and a few friends, including Manuel Pallarés and Manolo Hugué. At approximately 9pm and after many rounds of wine and absinthe, Casagemas asked Germaine one final time if she would marry him. When she refused, he drew a pistol and shot at her. The bullet did not strike her, but she fell to the ground. Casagemas then turned the gun and shot himself in the right temple. He died in a hospital later that evening.

One of Picasso's portraits accompanied Casagemas's obituary nine days later. Picasso returned to Paris in May, 1901, resumed residence in the studio that he had shared with Casagemas, visited the site of Casagemas's suicide, and eventually had an affair with Germaine. During the years to follow, Picasso painted various death portraits of Casagemas.

Germaine remained part of Picasso's life for many years and was later one of the models depicted in Picasso's Les Demoiselles d'Avignon and much later in another painting The Three Dancers.

== Solo exhibit ==
In 2014, the National Art Museum of Catalonia (Museu Nacional d'Art de Catalunya, MNAC) put up the first major exhibit dedicated solely to Casagemas's work.

== In popular culture ==
Robert Sheehan portrayed Casagemas in the 2018 season of the television series Genius, which focuses on the life and career of Pablo Picasso.
