= Marquess of Oris =

Marquessate of Oris
- Heraldic crown of a Marquess
- Creation date: 1 August 1708
- Created by: Charles VI (pretender) (first creation); Alfonso XIII (re-creation)
- Peerage: Peerage of Spain
- First holder: Carlos de Orís y Puiggener
- Present holder: Ana Isabel de Sentmenat Vilá
- Former seat: Oris Castle

Arms of Orís, county of Osona, Province of Barcelona.

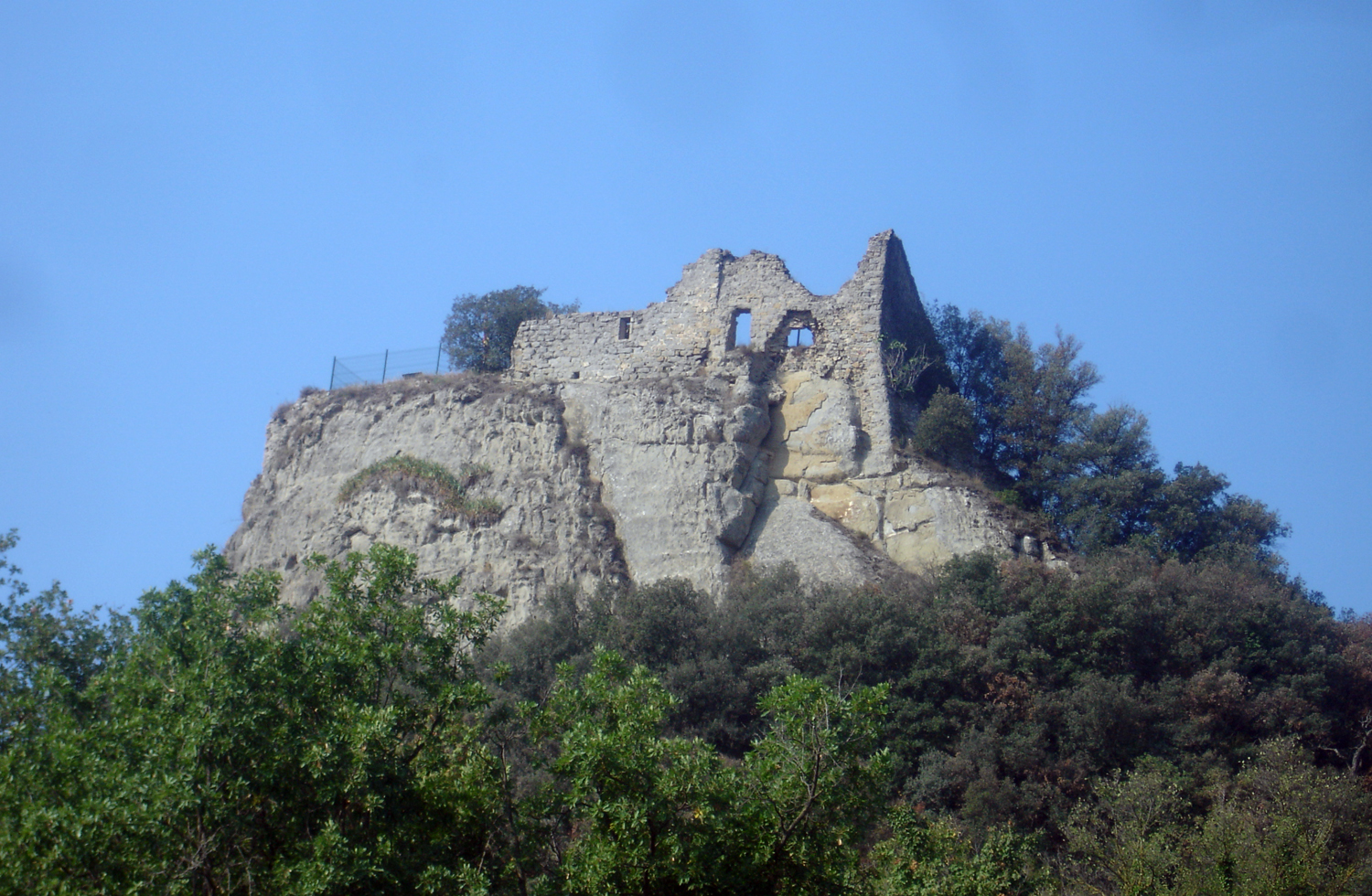
Remains of the old Oris Castle, where Carlos de Orís y Puiggener, 1st Marquess of Oris, was the lord of.

Marquess of Oris (Marqués de Orís) is a hereditary title in the Peerage of Spain granted on 1 August 1708 by Charles VI, pretender to the Spanish Crown in favor of Carlos de Orís y Puiggener. The name makes reference to Oris Castle in the county of Osona, Province de Barcelona, of which the 1st Marquess was the lord of, as a descendant of the second branch of the Orís line.

It was re-created in 1915 by Alfonso XIII in favor of Carlos de Sentmenat y de Sentmenat, who also held the titles of Marquess of Castelldosrius (which had attached to it a Grandeeship) and Baron of Santa Pau.

== Marquesses of Oris ==
- Carlos de Orís y Puiggener, 1st Marquess of Oris

Other titles (2nd–4th Marquesses): Marquess of Castelldosrius, Grandee of Spain and Baron of Santa Pau

- Carlos de Sentmenat y de Sentmenat, 2nd Marquess of Oris (grandson of the 1st Marquess)
- Félix de Sentmenat y Güell, 3rd Marquess of Oris (son of the 2nd Marquess)
- Santiago de Sentmenat y de Urruela, 4th Marquess of Oris (son of the 3rd Marquess)
- Ana Isabel Sentmenat Vilá, 5th Marchioness of Oris (eldest daughter of the 4th Marquess)
