= Marquess of Castelldosrius =

Marquessate of Castelldosrius
- Heraldic crown of a Grandee
- Creation date: 6 April 1696
- Created by: Charles II
- Peerage: Peerage of Spain
- First holder: Manuel de Oms y Santa Pau
- Present holder: Ágatha Ruiz de la Prada y Sentmenat
- Heir apparent: Tristán Jerónimo Ramírez Ruiz de la Prada
- Subsidiary titles: Baron of Santa Pau

Marquess of Castelldosrius (Spanish: Marqués de Castelldosríus) is a hereditary title in the Peerage of Spain, accompanied by the dignity Grandee and granted on 6 April 1696 by Charles II to Manuel de Oms y Santa Pau, knight of the Order of Malta, governor of Tarragona, viceroy and captain general of Mallorca, of Peru, of Tierra Firme and of Chile. The grandeeship was merged into the marquessate on 9 July 1701 by Philip V, later confirmed on 1 May 1703.

The title is currently held by Ágatha Ruiz de la Prada y Sentmenat, who also holds the title of Baroness of Santa Pau.

== Marquesses of Castelldosrius ==
Other titles (all): Grandee of Spain

- Manuel de Oms y de Santa Pau, 1st Marquess of Castelldosrius (died 1710)
- Félix de Sentmenat-Oms y de Santa Pau, 2nd Marquess of Castelldosrius (son of the 1st Marquess)
- Juan Manuel de Sentmenat-Oms y de Santa Pau, 3rd Marquess of Castelldosrius (son of the 1st Marquess)
- Manuel de Sentmenat-Oms y de Santa Pau, 4th Marquess of Castelldosrius (son of the 3rd Marquess)
- Francisco Javier Sentmenat Oms y Vera de Santa Pau, 5th Marquis of Castelldosrius (son of the 4th Marquis)
- Pedro Carlos de Sentmenat Oms y Vera de Santa, 6th Marquess of Castelldosrius (grandson of the 4th Marquess)
- Carlos de Sentmenat-Oms y de Santa Pau, 7th Marquess of Castelldosrius (grandson of the 4th Marquess)
- Ramón de Sentmenat y Sáenz-Ramírez, 8th Marquess of Castelldosrius (son of the 7th Marquess)

Other titles (9th–12th Marquess): Marquess of Oris and Baron of Santa Pau

- Carlos de Sentmenat y Sentmenat, 9th Marquess of Castelldosrius (son of the 8th Marquess)
- Félix de Sentmenat y Güell, 10th Marquess of Castelldosrius (son of the 9th Marquess)
- Carlos de Sentmenat y Urruela, 11th Marquess of Castelldosrius (son of the 10th Marquess, died without issue)
- Santiago de Sentmenat y Urruela, 12th Marquess of Castelldosrius (son of the 10th Marquess)

Other titles (13th Marchioness onwards): Baroness of Santa Pau

- Ágatha Ruiz de la Prada y Sentmenat, 13th Marchioness of Castelldosrius (born 1960) (granddaughter of the 9th Marquess)

The heir apparent is Tristán Jerónimo Ramírez Ruiz de la Prada (eldest son of the 13th Marchioness).

== Succession ==
After the death of the 11th Marquess, Carlos de Sentmenat y Urruela, in 2005, the title passed unto his brother, Santiago, who was also the 4th Marquess of Oris. However, Ágatha Ruiz de la Prada, niece of the 11th Marquess, sued his uncle, the 12th Marquess, for the Marquessate of Castelldosrius and the Barony of Santa Pau on the grounds that she was the rightful heir as her mother was older than Santiago, and thus, in accordance with a law passed in 2005, she was next in line to both titles. After almost 4 years of legal battles, Ruiz de la Prada was granted both titles through judicial sentence.
