= Ágatha Ruiz de la Prada =

Spanish fashion designer, aristocrat and businesswoman

The Most Excellent Ágatha Ruiz de la Prada 13th Marchioness of Castelldosríus GE
- Ruiz de la Prada in 2024
- Born: Águeda Isabel Ruiz de la Prada y Sentmenat; 22 July 1960 (age 66); Madrid, Spain
- Spouse: Pedro J. Ramirez (divorced in 2016)
- Children: Tristán Jerónimo Ramírez; Olivia Cósima Ramírez
- Parent(s): Juan Manuel Ruiz de la Prada; María Isabel de Sentmenat y Urruela
- Awards: Fashion Ambassador Award (2009); Fashion Oscar Award (2004); New Yorker Award (2007)

Ágatha Ruiz de la Prada
- Type: Private
- Industry: Clothing
- Founded: 1981
- Headquarters: Madrid, Spain
- Key people: Ágatha Ruiz de la Prada
- Products: Clothes, fragrance
- Website: http://www.agatharuizdelaprada.com

Águeda Isabel Ruiz de la Prada y Sentmenat, 13th Marchioness of Castelldosríus, 29th Baroness of Santa Pau, GE (Spanish pronunciation: [ˈaɣata ˈrwiθ ðe la ˈpɾaða]; better known as Ágatha Ruiz de la Prada; 22 July 1960) is a Spanish fashion designer and aristocrat.

== Biography ==
Ágatha entered fashion in 1981 with her women's collection in Madrid. She opened her first studio in the Spanish capital and began to participate in fashion shows in Madrid and Barcelona. Agatha was a promoter of the “Movida Madrileña,” an artistic and Cultural Revolution in the 1980s.

Commercial success came with her partnership with El Corte Inglés. She started to gain international recognition by means of her fashion shows in Spain, France, Italy, Colombia, USA, Puerto Rico, Santo Domingo and exhibitions in Tokyo, New York, Paris, Moscow and Bucharest.

In 1991, Agatha licensed her brand, expanding her line to include men's, women's and children's fashion, ceramics, toys, shoes, linens and towels, make-up and more. Her stores are located in Madrid, Barcelona, Paris, Milan, New York, Oporto and Mallorca, and she is present in over 140 countries around the world. This year, on the occasion of the 30th Anniversary of her first fashion show, she inaugurated her Foundation.

Her perfumes belong to Puig company.

In 2010, she was granted the titles of Marchioness of Castelldosrius (which has attached to it a Grandeeship) and Baroness of Santa Pau after a legal battle with her uncle.

In 2015, Miley Cyrus chose two of her sculptural dresses for the MTV Video Music Awards, who said "Gatize" when wearing her designs and was the best representation of the brand's spirit.

== Personal life ==
She had a relationship Pedro J. Ramirez and they have two children, Tristán (b. 1987) and Cósima (b. 1990). In 2016 they separated, three months after their marriage in Madrid. They divorced in 2017. Her daughter, Cósima Ramírez always wears Agatha Ruiz de la Prada's designs when attending public and private events.
