= Antoine Samuel Adam-Salomon =

French sculptor and photographer (1818–1881)

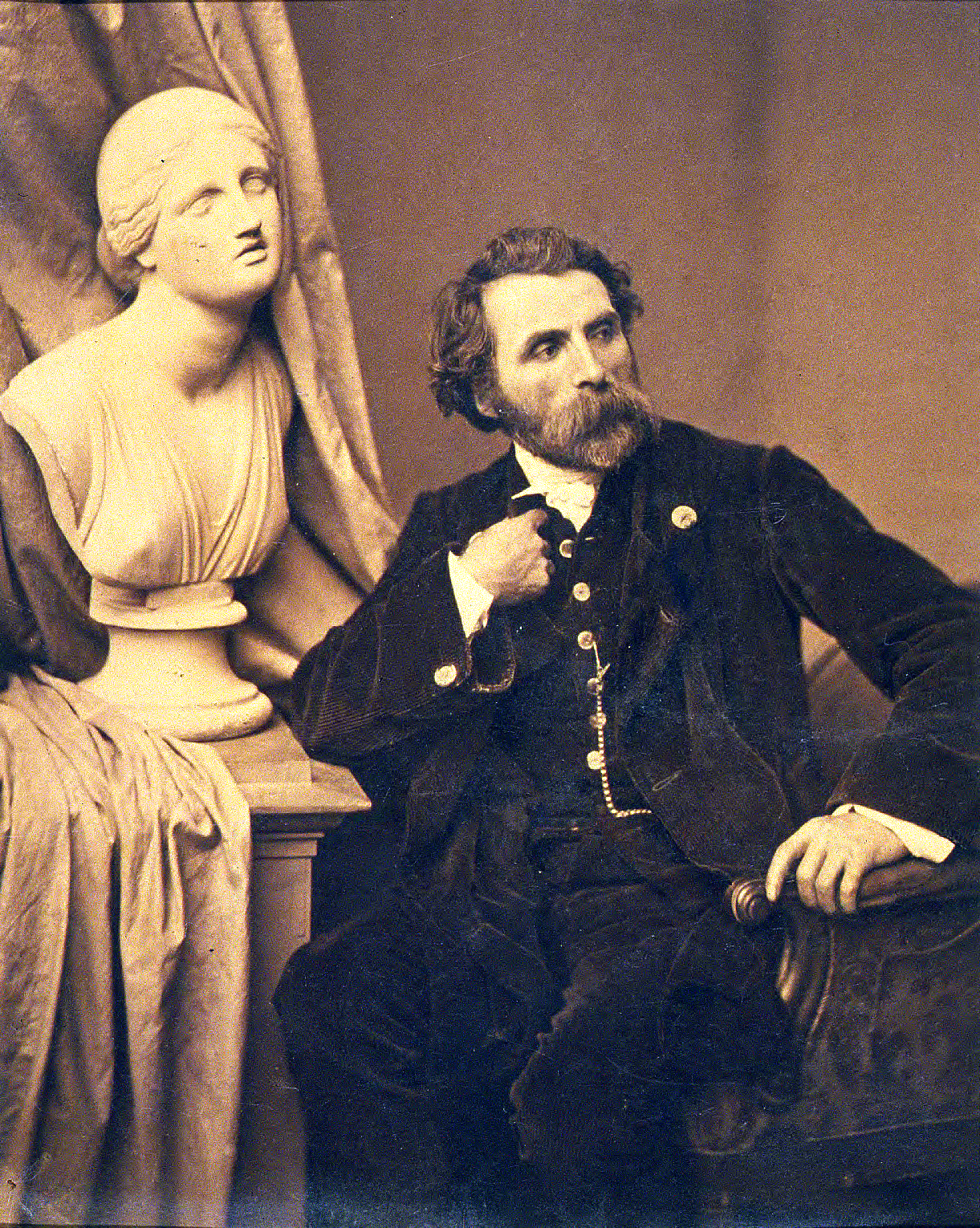
- Self-portrait, c. 1860
- Born: 9 January 1818; La Ferté-sous-Jouarre, Seine-et-Marne, Kingdom of France
- Died: 28 April 1881 (aged 63); Paris, French Third Republic
- Resting place: Fontainebleau
- Other names: Exhibited in the Salon as "Adama" (1844 and 1848).
- Occupations: Sculptor, portrait photographer
- Organization: Société Française de Photographie
- Spouse: Georgine Cornélie Coutellier (m. 1850; died 1878)
- Awards: Legion of Honour - Knight (1870)

Antoine Samuel Adam-Salomon (9 January 1818 – 28 April 1881) was a French sculptor and photographer.

== Early career ==
Antoine Samuel Adam-Salomon was born to a French Jewish family on 9 January 1818 in La Ferté-sous-Jouarre, Seine-et-Marne, France. His father, Nathan-Herschel Salomon, intended for Antoine to have a career as a merchant. Following a brief career as a modeler for the Jacob Petit pottery factory in Fontainebleau, he received a scholarship to study sculpture in Paris. He also traveled for studies to Switzerland and England. His notable sculptures include busts of Victor Cousin, Odilon Barrot, Pierre-Jean de Béranger, Alphonse de Lamartine, Gioachino Rossini, and Marie Antoinette.

== Photography ==
After becoming established as a sculptor, Adam-Salomon studied photography under the portraitist Franz Hanfstaengl in Munich in 1858. He became a leading portrait photographer. Adam-Salomon returned to Paris where he opened a portrait studio in 1859. In 1865 he opened a second Paris studio. Adam-Salomon's portrait photographs were considered to be among the best existing works during his lifetime, and were renowned for their chiaroscuro produced by special lighting techniques.

== Awards ==
In 1870 Adam-Salomon was made a member of the Société française de photographie. He received a knighthood in France's Legion of Honour the same year, by decree on 9 August 1870.

== Significance ==
=== Photography as art ===
The photography of Adam-Salomon played a pivotal role in the mainstream acceptance of photography as an art form. For example, in 1858 the poet Alphonse de Lamartine described photography as "this chance invention which will never be art, but only a plagiarism of nature through a lens." A short time later, after seeing the photographs by Adam-Solomon, Lamartine changed his opinion.

=== Critical praise ===
Coverage of Salomon's work in the French press outnumbered that of Félix Nadar by a ratio of ten to one. After the Paris Exposition of 1867, the reviewer for The Times (UK) described Salomon's pictures "matchless", "beyond praise," "the finest photographic portraits in the world."

In the 1868 edition of the British Journal of Photography Almanac, editor J. Traill Taylor wrote:

The important discovery of the past year has been that M. Adams-Salomon, a Parisian photographer, has produced portraits of so high class as to show us the true capabilities of photography, and how much we have yet to overcome ere similar perfection can be claimed for the works of our average artists. It is far from being pleasant to know that we are so far behind the Parisians; but, believing such to be the case, the knowledge of the fact will, without doubt, rouse English artists to a sense of their shortcomings and the particular direction in which progress must be made.

== Selected works ==
=== Photography ===
Adam-Salomon is known for producing a number of photographic works:

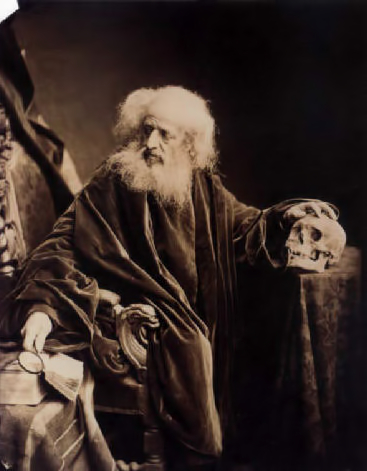
Philosophe

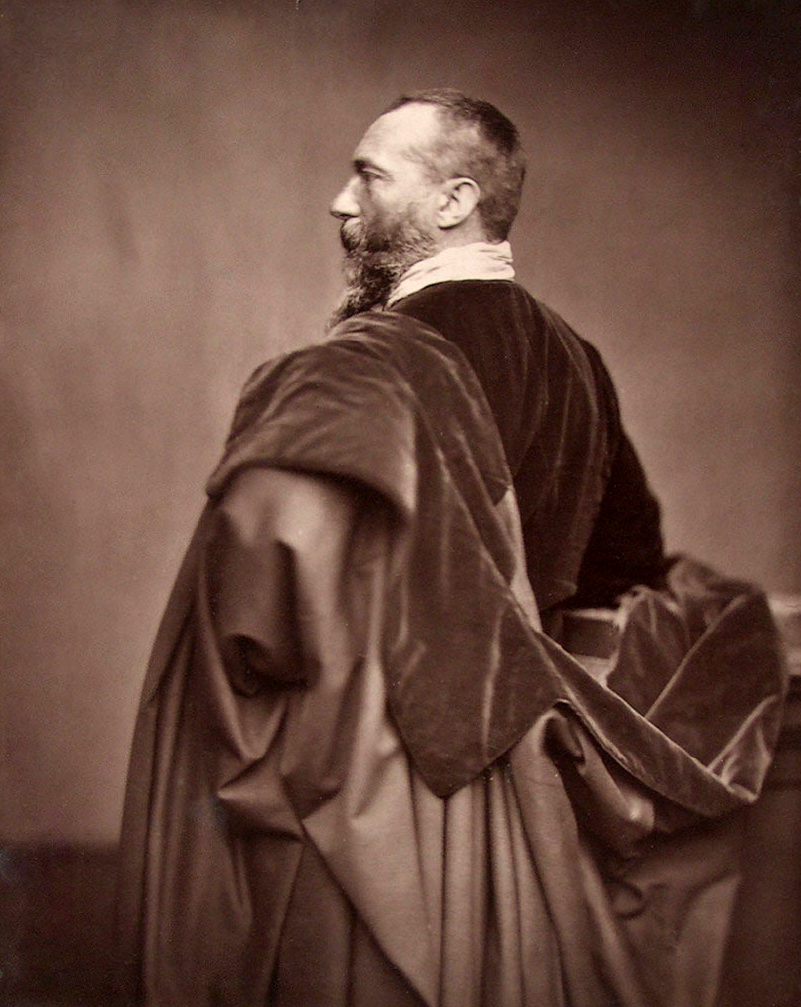
Alphonse Karr, French critic, journalist, and novelist.

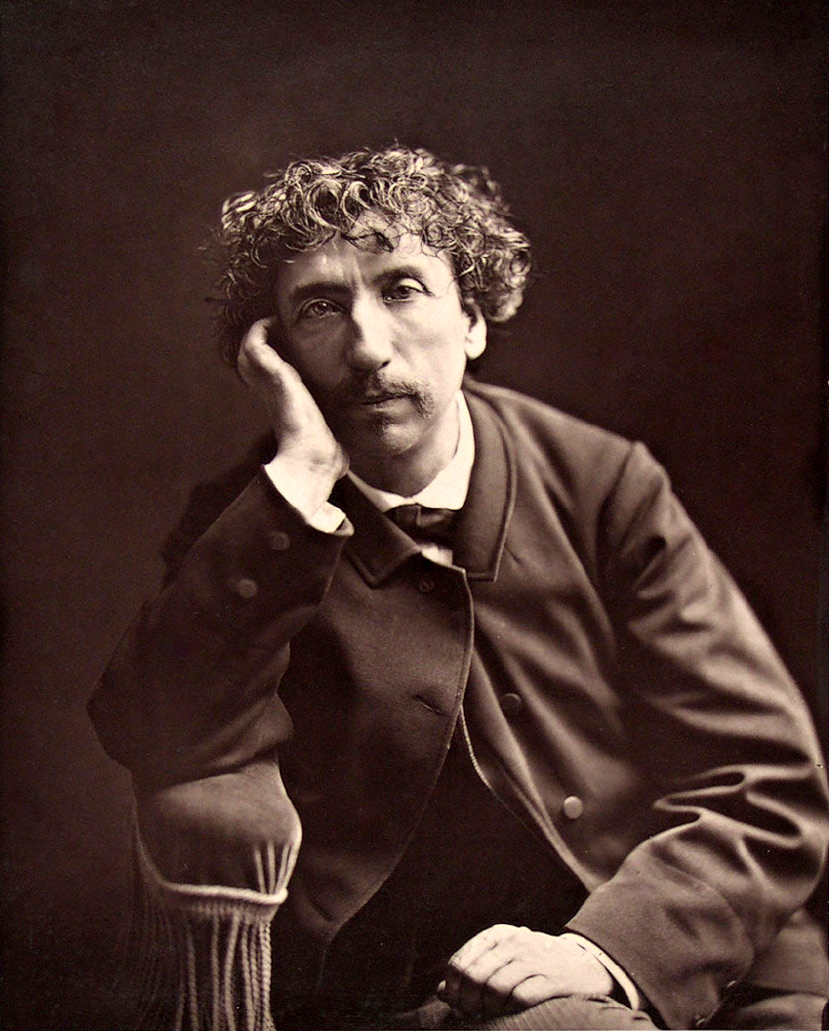
Charles Garnier, French architect.

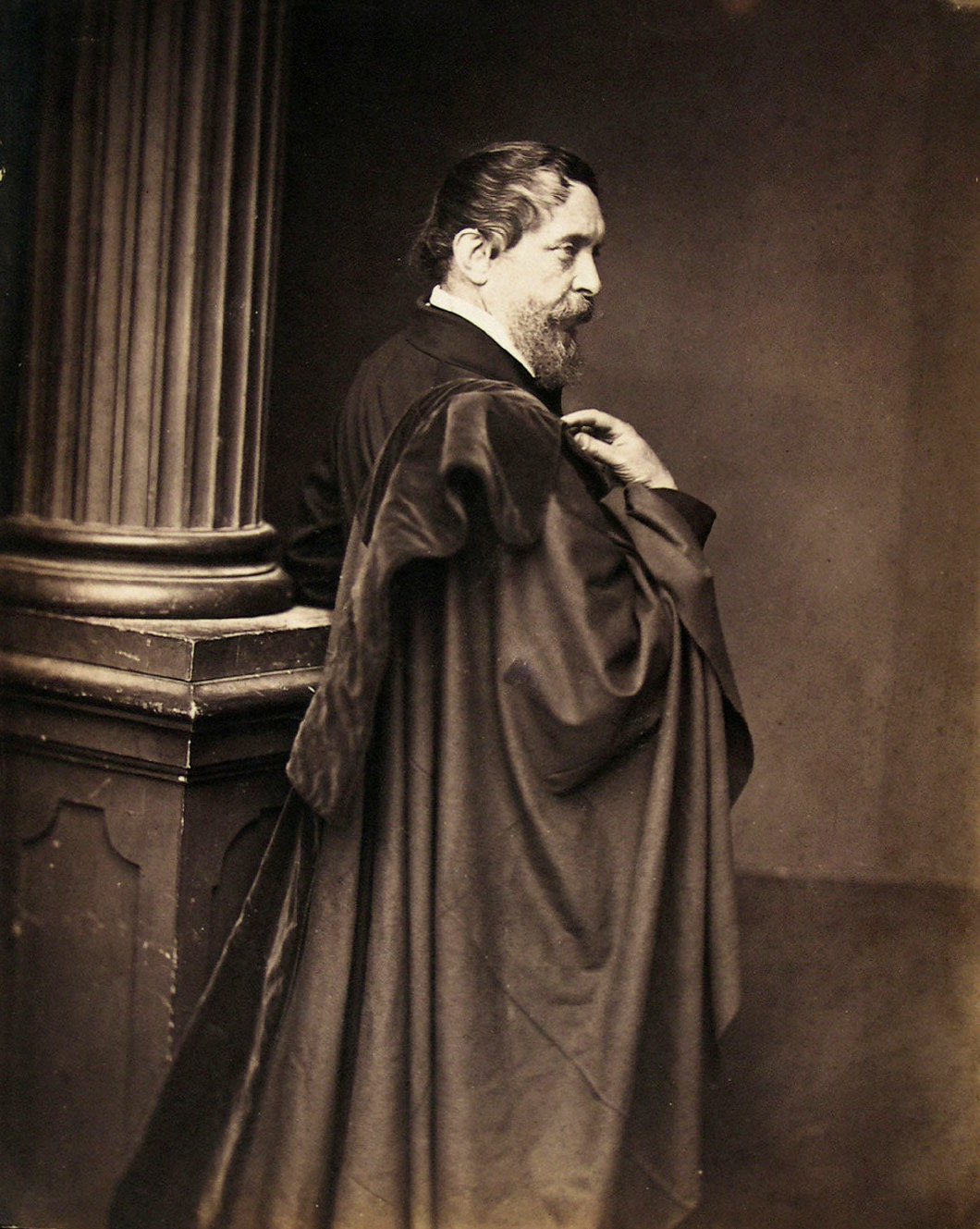
Lajos Kossuth, Hungarian politician and revolutionary.

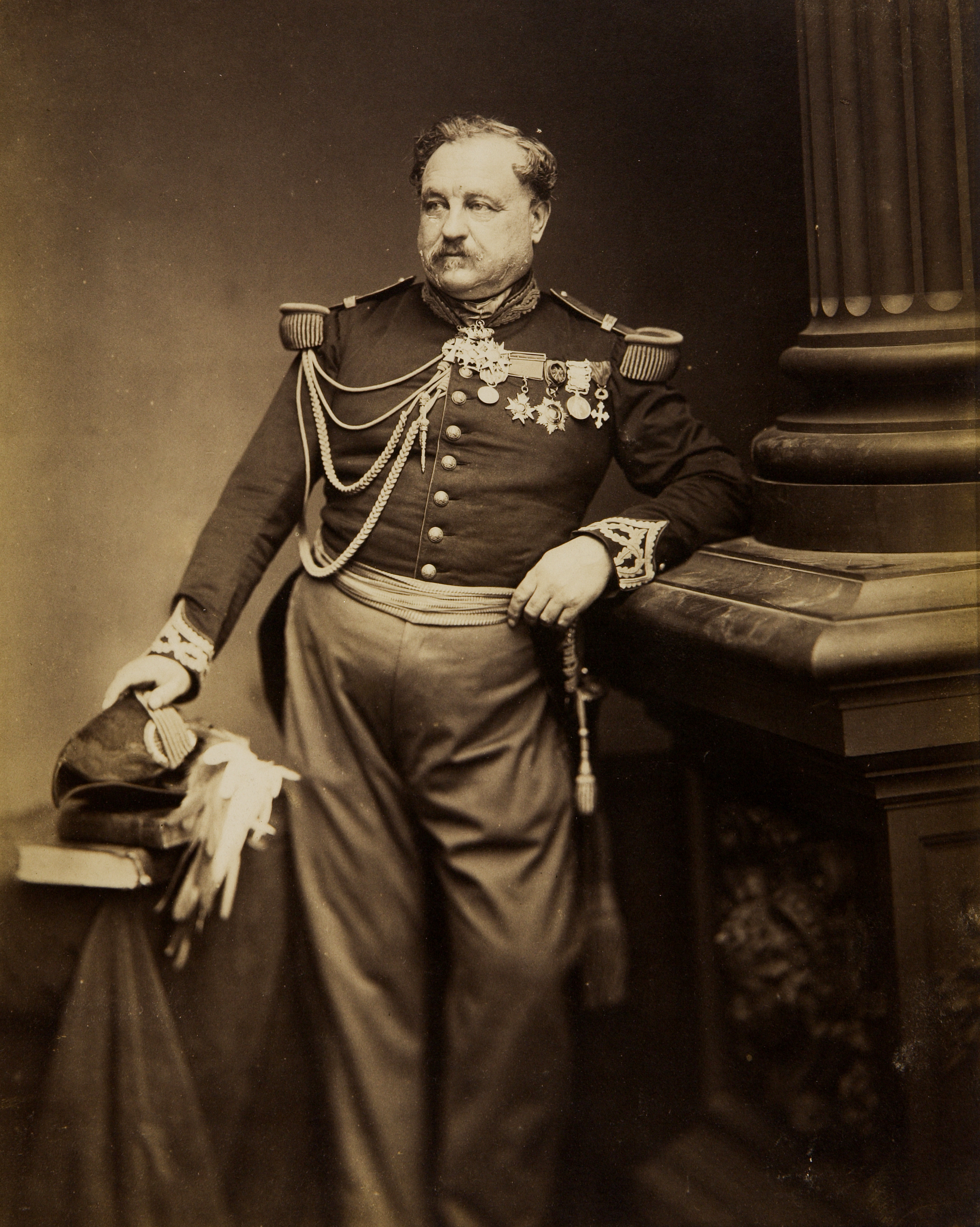
Labeled as "General Giroflore", identity unknown.

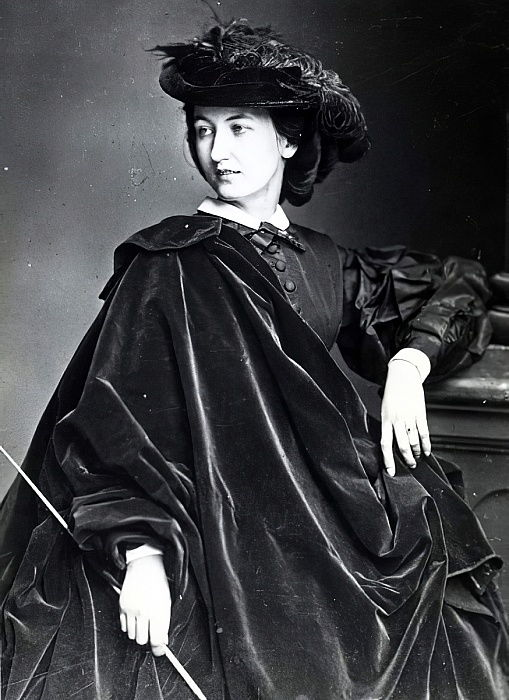
Said to be Lola Montez, Irish dancer, actress, and courtesan

=== Sculpture ===
Adam-Salomon is known for a number of sculptures:-

- Edwin Chadwick at National Portrait Gallery
- Adam-Salomon's bust sculptures of Elisabeth of Bavaria at Sotheby's

== Personal life ==
In 1850, Adam-Salomon married Georgine Cornélie Coutellier, a fellow artist. Coutellier was born a Christian, but converted to Judaism upon marrying Adam-Salomon, and embraced the Hebrew faith until her death in February 1878. They had no children together.

== See also ==
- Legion of Honour
- Legion of Honour Museum
- List of Legion of Honour recipients by name (A)
- Ribbons of the French military and civil awards
