= Isabel Güell i López =

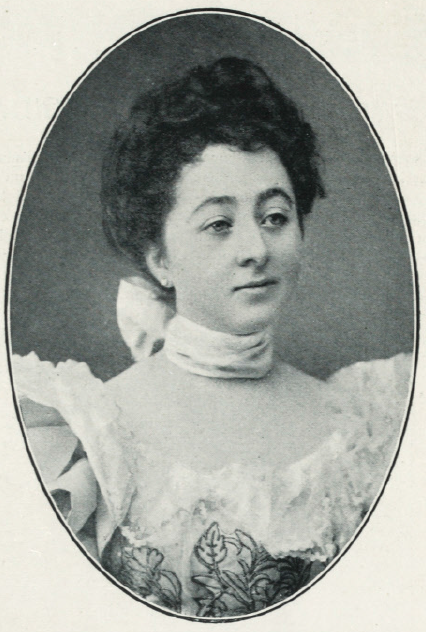
Isabel Güell i Lopez (1911)

Isabel María Francisca de Paula Luisa Clementina Güell y López (Barcelona, November 23, 1872 - Barcelona, May 8, 1956), Marquess of Castelldosrius, was a Spanish composer of religious works, as well as a pianist and organist. She composed approximately 34 works.

== Early life and education ==
Isabel María Francisca de Paula Luisa Clementina Güell y López was born in Barcelona on November 23, 1872. Her mother was Isabel López Bru, born in Cuba (daughter of the first Marquess of Comillas, Antonio López y López); her father was Eusebi Güell, first Count of Güell. Eulalia Anzizu was Isabel's cousin.

She began her studies with Josep García Robles, composer of her father's court. She studied with her aunt, Josefa Bacigalupi, and later studied piano and organ in Barcelona and Paris.

== Career ==
The Güell family moved to Versailles as a result of the cholera epidemic that devastated Spain in 1885. During their French stay, Isabel and her younger sister, María Luisa Güell López received organ lessons from Eugène Gigout. Isabel wrote for the magazine Feminal, directed by Carmen Karr, and the supplement of the weekly La Ilustració Catalana.

She played the piano and the organ and belonged to the choir of the Centro de Cultura de Mujeres Francesca Bonnemaison directed by Francesca Bonnemaison i Farriols. Her main dedication was to charity and philanthropy, as befitted a woman of her social class. She was also interested in education. In 1902, she was appointed a member of the Board of Public Instruction of Barcelona.

She composed approximately 34 works, mostly religious music, which were performed at different times, for example, on April 23, 1911, in a mass celebrated at the Colonia Güell for the feast of Sant Jordi. She also composed chamber music and songs with piano accompaniment incorporating lyrics by different poets. She also wrote a Te Deum (1918) and a Stabat Mater (1917).

== Personal life ==
Isabel's father, a patron of Antoni Gaudí, commissioned works such as the Palau Güell and Park Güell. She lived in Palau Güell with her parents and siblings from her teenage years until 1901, when she married Carlos de Sentmenat y Sentmenat, Grandee of Spain, IX Marquis of Castelldosrius, Marquis of Orís and Baron of Santa Pau. Gaudí decorated the young couple's house on Junta de Comercio Street. The anecdote is told that Gaudí, unable to fit Isabel's grand piano, recommended that she play the violin. This fact is recorded by Josep Carner in a passage of his book Auques i ventalls.

From 1939 onwards, she devoted herself to her grandchildren, giving them music and French lessons. She died in Barcelona on May 8, 1956, and was buried in the family pantheon of Dosrius (Mataró).

== Selected works ==
- Amunt! (1889). Lyrics: Ramón Picó Campamar
- Gavota (1890). Dedicated to Enriqueta Goletti.
- La llar (1890). Dedicated to her son Félix de Sentmenat y Güell. Lyrics: Ramón Picó Campanar
- Sanctus (1892)
- Ave María (ed. Londres 1894). Lyrics: Ramón Picó Campanar
- Minuet [(1894)]
- Letanías de la Virgen (1896)
- Serenata [(1896)]
- Pater Noster (1897)
- Cant del sometent (1898). Lyrics: Eulalia Anzizu
- Rima (1898). Lyrics: Gustavo Adolfo Bécquer
- Te Deum (1898)
- Offerimus tibi Domine (1899)
- Psallite Deo nostro (1899)
- Ecce lignum (1905)
- Corpus Christi (1911). Lyrics: Ramón Picó Campanar
- Jesús als noys (1911)
- Pregaria al Sagrat Cor de Jesús (1911Lyrics
- Balada (1912). Dedicated to Melchor Rodríguez de Alcántara. Lyrics: Joan Roís de Corella
- Barcarola "Lo que diu una cançó" (1912). Lyrics: Miguel Costa y Llobera
- Domine Dominus noster (1913)
- La rosa marcida (1915). Dedicated to the choir of the Institut de Cultura Popular per a la Dona. Lyrics: Jacint Verdaguer
- Sacris solemnis (1915)
- Tantum ergo (1915)
- Cançó trista (1916). Lyrics: Apeles Mestres
- Stabat Mater (1917)
- Jubilate Deo omnis terra, Psalmo XCIX (1918)
- Benedictus. Lyrics: Isabel López Bru
- Comunión
- Douce espérance. Dedicated to María Cristina de Habsburgo, queen regent
- Misa
- Misa en honor de San Eusebio
- O salutaris
- Pulchra est, et decora

== Discography ==
- CD, Compositores catalanas. Generación modernista. María Teresa Garrigosa (soprano) and Heidrun Bergander (piano). La mano de guido. Dip.leg. B-45.116-2008.

== Bibliography ==
- Albert i Corp, Esteve (1900). Isabel Güell i López de Sentmenat. Marquesa de Castelldosrius. Andorra la Vella: Pyrene, 1999. ISBN 9991316043
