= Luisa Casagemas =

Catalan violinist, singer and composer

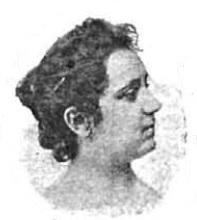
Lluisa Casagemas i Coll in Barcelona Comica magazine, 1894

Lluïsa Casagemas i Coll (b. 13 Dec 1873, d. ? after 1930; one source says c. 1942) was a Catalan violinist, singer and composer. She was born in Barcelona and studied composition with Francesc de Paula Sánchez i Gavagnach and violin with Agustí Torelló. She began composing at an early age and made her debut as a composer in 1893 with a symphonic poem.

Casagemas' opera Schiava e regina won a prize at the World Columbian Exposition in Chicago in 1892; it has to be performed in 1893 at Gran Teatre del Liceu, Barcelona; it would be the first opera by a woman performed there. However, an anarchist attack with a bomb interrupted the opera season and the theatre was closed for months. So, the opera was not performed; as a compensation for the author, several fragments were performed before the Spanish royal family in Madrid in 1894. After, it was forgotten and never performed nor recorded.

Afterward Casagemas sang her own compositions at the salon of novelist Emilia Pardo Bazán, and he introduced her to musical and literary society.

== Works ==
Casagemas composed over than 300 works, solo and chamber music and songs with piano. Selected works include:

- Crepusculo for orchestra (1893)
- Schiava e regina, opera (1879–1881)
- I briganti; Montserrat, opera (op. 227)

=== Discography ===
- Compositores catalanes. Generació modernista (CD). Maria Teresa Garrigosa (soprano) and Heidrun Bergander (piano). La mà de guido. Dip.leg. B-45116-2008. Contains songs by Narcisa Freixas, Carmen Karr, Isabel Güell i López, and Luisa Casagemas.
