= Francisco Javier Sentmenat, 5th Marquis of Casteldosrius =

Spanish army officer and senator (1767–1842)

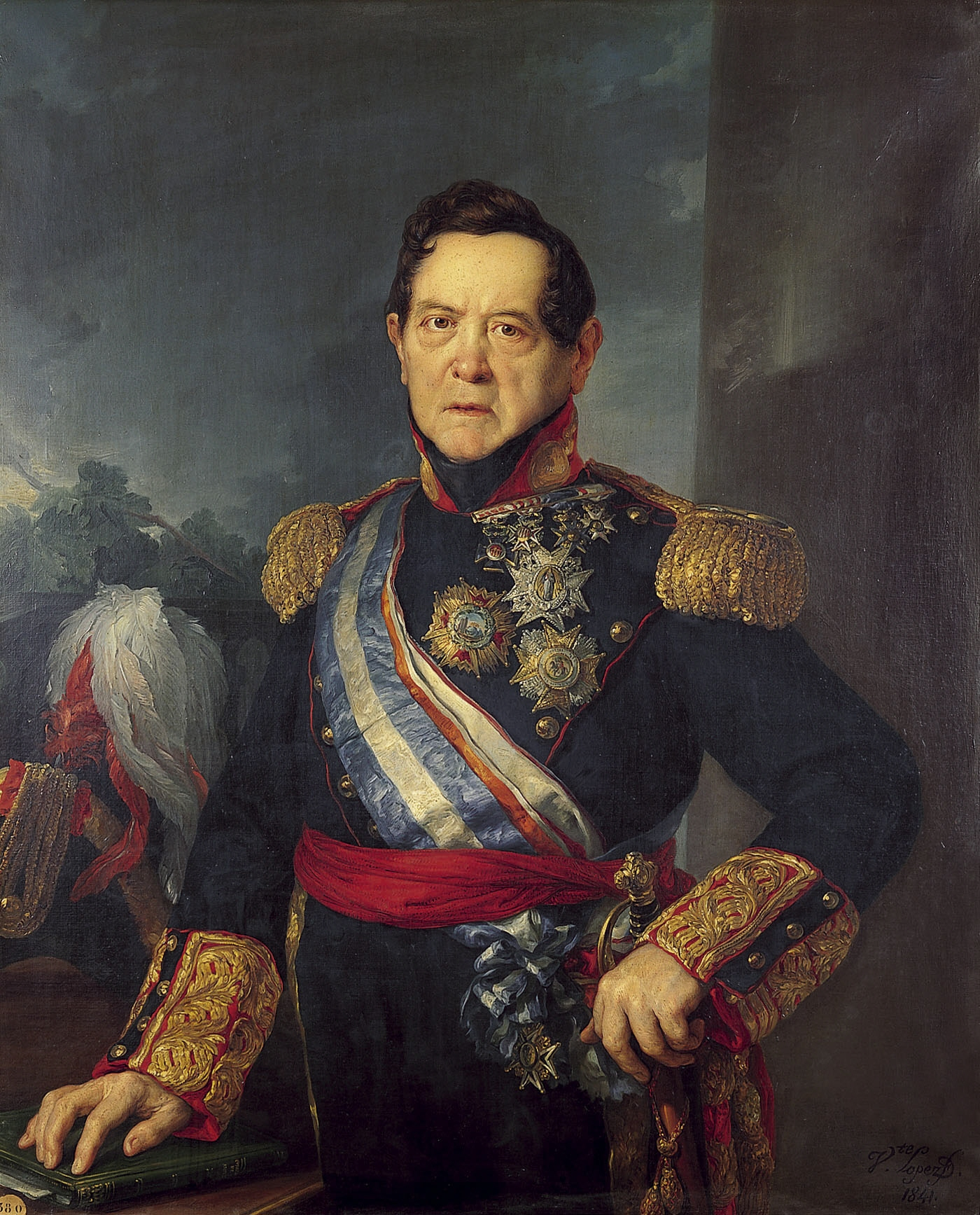
- Francisco Javier de Sentmenat-Oms y de Santa Pau, marqués de Castelldosríus (1841), by Vicente López Portaña. (Real Academia de Bellas Artes de San Fernando).
- Born: 9 March 1763; Murcia, Spain
- Died: 3 January 1827 (aged 63) Madrid, Spain
- Branch: Cavalry
- Conflicts: American Revolutionary War; Great Siege of Gibraltar; War of the First Coalition; Battle of Mas Deu; Battle of Perpignan; Battle of Truillas; First Battle of Boulou; War of the Oranges; Peninsular War

Francisco Javier Sentmenat Oms y Vera de Santa Pau, 5th Marquis of Casteldosrius (7 January 1767 – 1 February 1842), was a Spanish army officer and senator.

== Early career ==
In 1777, at the age of ten, he enlisted as a cadet in the Alcantara Cavalry Regiment, of which his father was the colonel. Two years later, he was attached as an ensign to the King's Dragoon Regiment before returning, the following year to his original unit as a Cavalry ensign. In 1781, at the age of 14, he was promoted to captain.

As a captain attached to the Duke of Mahón's Volunteers, he saw action at the Great Siege of Gibraltar, being promoted to lieutenant colonel in 1783. In 1785, he was appointed captain of the Montesa Cavalry Regiment and in 1789, captain of that regiment's Carabineros and promoted to its colonel in 1791.

In 1793, he was transferred to the Calatrava Cavalry Regiment of the Roussillon Army, seeing action at the battles of Mas Deu, Perpignan, Truillas, and Boulou.

In 1794, he was attached to Barcelona, and in 1796, following the death of his father, he came into the title of marquis.

In 1800, he was attached, as colonel, to the Algarve Cavalry Regiment and the following year was Godoy's aide-de-camp during the War of the Oranges. That year he was given command of the Santiago Cavalry Regiment and promoted to brigadier in 1782.

He then served under general Castaños in the Campo de Gibraltar.

== Peninsular War ==
Following the signing of the Treaty of Fontainebleau (1807), by which Carrafa was given the command of the Spanish corps of 7,500 infantrymen, 2,150 cavalry and 20 cannon that was to join Junot's French army at Alcántara, prior to the invasion of Portugal, in November 1807, Casteldosrius was sent to Porto at the head of two squadrons of his regiment. From there, he went on to garrison Santarem where, following the news from Spain of the Dos de Mayo Uprising, his regiment was disarmed by the French in June. He remained prisoner until liberated by English forces in September.

He then went to Barcelona where Reding gave him command of his 1st Division. In 1809, he was promoted to major general of Cavalry, rank with which he saw action at the Spanish defeat at Valls (February 1809). Casteldosrius, commanding the Cavalry brigade, was the highest-ranking officer of the several taken prisoner. Taken prisoner to France, he returned to Spain in May 1814.

== Post-war career ==
On his return to Spain, in 1814, Ferdinand VI promoted Casteldosrius to field marshal and he served under Castaños, Duke of Bailén, in the Observation Army of the Right (Ejército de Observación de la Derecha) during the Hundred Days (March–July 1815). He was then appointed captain-general of Andalusia and given command of Cadiz. In 1819, he left that posting on being promoted to lieutenant general, colonel of the 2nd Regiment of the Guardias de Infantería Española and a member of the Supreme War Council.

Following Rafael del Riego's 1820 pronunciamiento, Casteldosrius declared himself on favour of the Constitution and was confirmed in his command of the 2nd Regiment until his appointment, in February 1822, as Captain General of Catalonia. Following the uprising of the Royal Guard on July 1822, he was appointed commander-in-chief of Madrid in August and governor that November.

When the Hundred Thousand Sons of Saint Louis invaded Spain, Casteldosrius was appointed second-in-command to Enrique O'Donnell, Conde de La Bisbal, whom he substituted when O'Donnell was dismissed. Having deployed his troops in Talavera and Almaraz, he was appointed governor of Badajoz in May 1823.

With the restoration of Ferdinand VII's absolutist monarchy, Casteldosrius was dispossed of all his ranks and military decorations and sentenced to eight years' imprisonment, which he served in the castle of Olivenza, Cáceres and the castle on San Antón, where he remained until the king's death in 1833.

In 1834, the Queen Regent restored his ranks and in 1836 he was appointed interim captain general of Galicia and then Director General of Artillery, post he held until 1840. In 1841 and 1842, he was senator for Barcelona.
