= Baron of Santa Pau =

Hereditary Peerage of Spain

Barony of Santa Pau
- Heraldic crown of a Baron
- Creation date: before 1070
- Peerage: Spanish nobility
- Present holder: Ágatha Ruiz de la Prada y Sentmenat
- Heir apparent: Tristán Jerónimo Ramírez Ruiz de la Prada
- Former seat: Castle of Santa Pau

Baron of Santa Pau (Spanish: Barón de Santa Pau) is a hereditary title in the Spanish nobility created in Catalonia on an unknown date, though believed to have been made before 1070, as at that time, in Girona, there are records of a knight named Almérico I de Santa Pau as the lord of this barony, being the first person recorded as such. After that, the title is lost, until it is once again mentioned in 1360, without mention of who the baron was.

The title was re-created by Alfonso XIII in 1916 in favour of Carlos de Sentmenat y Sentmenat, 9th Marquess of Castelldosrius, 2nd Marquess of Oris (re-created in 1915).

The title is currently held by Ágatha Ruiz de la Prada y Sentmenat, who also holds the title of Marchioness of Castelldosrius, which has a Grandeeship attached.

== History ==
Juana de Santa Pau, wife of Berenguer V of Oms and daughter of Hugo I Ademar, due to certain debts owed to her, sued her brother Galcerán Ademar and later his son and successor, Hugo III Ademar. Sentence was given in 1445, confirmed in 1446 and 1449, in favour of Juana, and in 1456, the curia of Besalú put the barony up for sale. It was bought by Juana's son, Berenguer VI of Oms y Santa Pau.

Antonio de Oms y Santa Pau, in his last will in 1551, established that should the male line of the oldest son of his second marriage, Berenguer de Oms-Santa Pau y de Calders, die, than the barony and the estate shall pass to the descendants of the oldest daughter of his first marriage, Ana de Oms-Santa Pau y Salvá (or Salbá). She married Enrique de Sentmenat y Sentmenat, and their son, Galceran de Sentmenat y Oms, marries Ana de Lanuza. Their son, Enrique de Sentmenat y de Lanuza, marries his sister-cousin, María de Lanuza y Raset. Their son, Manuel de Sentmenat y de Lanuza marries Joana de Oms y de Cabrera, and inherits the barony after Berenguer's male line dies.

In 1694, Manuel II (17th Baron) sued Cayetana de Oms-Santa Pau y de Sarriera, Baroness of Santa Pau, Vavasour of Montescot, etc., who had married the Marquess of Mojá of the Tower, Agustín de Copóns y de Copóns. The Royal Audience of Catalonia ruled in favour of his son, Félix I (18th Baron), on 1 June 1730, after his father's death. The sentence confirmed by the same body on 15 April 1739. The Sentmenants had claimed the title since 1694. This marked the start of the House of Sentmenat hold on the barony.

After the death of the 11th Marquess, Carlos de Sentmenat y Urruela, in 2005, the marquessate passed unto his brother, Santiago de Sentmenat y Urruela, who was also the 4th Marquess of Oris. However, Ágatha Ruiz de la Prada, niece of the 11th Marquess, sued his uncle, the 12th Marquess, for the marquessate of Castelldosrius and the barony of Santa Pau, both of which had claim by him, on the grounds that she was the rightful heir to the said titles, as her mother was older than Santiago, and thus, in accordance with a law passed in 2005, she was next in line to both titles. After almost 4 years of legal battles, Ruiz de la Prada, through judicial sentence, was granted both titles.

== Barons of Santa Pau ==
Early records of succession to the barony are scarse, and thus numbering early barons is not possible. Authors differ on the line of succession to the title, as well as the subsidiary titles held by each baron. Only titles held suo jure are listed.

=== House of Porqueras ===
- Hugo I Ademar, Baron of Santa Pau (died 1393)
  - Married Beatriz de Ribelles
- Poncio V, Baron of Santa Pau (died c. 1396)
- Hugo II Ademar, Baron of Santa Pau (died c. 1398)
- Galcerán Ademar de Santa Pau, Baron of Santa Pau (died 1438)
- Hugo III Ademar de Santa Pau, Baron of Santa Pau (died c. 1443)

=== House of Oms ===
- Berenguer V de Oms y de Santa Pau, Baron of Santa Pau
- Guillermo de Oms de Santa Pau y de Fabra, Baron of Santa Pau (died 1517)

Other titles: Baron of Montesquíu, Vavasour of Montescot, Lord of Oms, Tellet, Clairá, Sant Lorenç of the Saga, Saorra, the Clusa and Finestres, Carlan of Cotlliure.

- Berenguer VI de Oms de Santa Pau y de Perapertussa, Baron of Santa Pau (died 1541)
- Berenguer de Oms de Santa Pau y de Sentmenat, Baron of Santa Pau

Other titles: Vavasour of Montescot, Baron of Montesquíu and of Sant Martí de Montbrán, Lord of Oms, of Rubí and of Finestres, Carlan of Cotlliure and Sant Elm.

- Antonio I de Oms de Santa Pau y de Sentmenat, Baron of Santa Sau (Note: Used the titles of "Lord of the Castles of Finestras and Santa Pau, Vavasour of Montescot, Lord of Serra, in Conflent; of Saga, in Cerdaña; of Sompstallet, Montesquino, of the Clusa, Clayrá and Santo Lorenzo, in the Rosellón, and by His Catholic Majesty Captain of the Castle of Colibre".) (fl. 1543–1564)
  - Married twice: first with Lucrecia de Salbá, then with Aldonça de Calders
- Antonio II de Oms y Santa Pau y de Salbá, Baron of Santa Pau (died 1713)
  - Married Teresa de Oms y Sarriera (died 1713)
- Berenguer VII de Oms-Santa Pau y de Calders, 11th Baron of Santa Pau (died 1596)
  - Married María-Ana de Sentmenat y Oms (Note: Daughter of Enrique I de Sentmenat y de Sentmena and Ana de Oms y de Salbá (daughter of Antonio I).)

Other titles: Baron of Montesquíu, Vavasour of Montescot, Lord of Oms, Tellet, Clairá, Sant Lorenç of the Saga, Saorra, the Clusa, Finestres, Sant Martí de Montbrán, Sant Aniol and the Llobera.

- Berenguer VIII de Oms-Santa Pau y de Sentmenat, Baron of Santa Pau (died c. 1653)
- Antonio III de Oms-Santa Pau y de Sentmenat, Baron of Santa Pau, Berenguer VII
- Raimundo de Oms y de Santa Pau, Baron of Santa Pau (died 1713)
  - Married María de Oms y de Lanuza
- Maria Teresa de Oms de Santa Pau, Baroness of Santa Pau (died 1713)
  - Married Manuel de Oms y Cabrera
- Antonio de Oms de Cabrera y de Oms, Baron of Santa Pau (died 1705)
- Cayetana de Oms y Sarriera, Baroness of Santa Pau (Note: Used the title of "Cayetana de Copóns, Oms, Santa Pau, Desbosch, San Vicéns, Carriera y de Rocabertí, Marchioness of Moyá of Latorre and Baroness of Santa Pau, Lady of the Castle of San Vicente of Vilasar, Vavasour of Montescot".)
  - Married Agustín de Copóns y Copóns, 2nd Marquess of Moyá of the Tower

=== House of Copóns ===
Other titles: Marquess of Moyá of the Tower

- Cayetano Luís de Copóns y Oms, Baron of Santa Pau (died 1753)
- José de Copóns y Oms, Baron of Santa Pau, son of the 2nd Marquess
- María Josefa de Copóns y Cartellá, Baroness of Santa Pau
- María de Sarriera y de Copóns, Baroness of Santa Pau
- Josefa de Sarriera y de Copóns, Baroness of Santa Pau (died 1865)

=== House of Sentmenat ===
Other titles (17th Baron): Marquess of Castelldosrius (Grandee of Spain), Baron of Dosrius, Lord of Canyamars, Castellan of Angles Castle, Vavasour of Montescor, and Lord of Oms.

- Manuel II de Sentmenat-Oms de Santa Pau y de Lanuza, 17th Baron of Santa Pau (1651–1710)

Other titles (18th–21st Barons): Marquess of Castelldosrius (Grandee of Spain), Lord of Canyamars, Castellan of Angles Castle (Note: "Castle" dropped by the 19th Baron onwards.), Vavasour of Montescor, and Lord of Oms.

- Félix I de Sentmenat-Oms de Santa Pau y de Oms, 18th Baron of Santa Pau (1684–1744)
- Juan I Manuel de Sentmenat-Oms de Santa Pau y de Oms, 19th Baron of Santa Pau (1687–1754)
- Manuel III de Sentmenat-Oms de Santa Pau y de Cartellá, 20th Baron of Santa Pau (1730–1796)
- Francisco Javier I de Sentmenat-Oms de Santa Pau y de Vera, 21st Baron of Santa Pau (1767–1842)

Other titles (22nd and 23rd Barons): Marquess of Castelldosrius (Grandee of Spain), Vavasour of Montescot, Lord of Oms and of Canyamars, Castellan of Angles, Baron of Oris, Lord of Vallgornera, Lord of Pollestres, Castellan of the Castle of Voltregá, and Lord of the Castle of Rocafort and of the Priory of San Ginés of Rocafort.

- Pedro-Carlos I de Sentmenat-Oms de Santa Pau y Riquer, 22nd Baron of Santa Pau (1740–1817)
- Carlos I de Sentmenat-Oms de Santa Pau y de Riquer, 23rd Baron of Santa Pau (1794–1856)

Other titles (24rd Baron): Marquess of Castelldosrius (Grandee of Spain), Baron of Oris, Vavasour of Montescot, Castellan of the Castle of Angles, 21st Lord of the Castle of Vallgornera, Castellan of the Castle of Voltregá.

- Ramón I de Sentmenat-Oms de Santa Pau y de Sáenz-Ramírez, 24th Baron of Santa Pau (1842–1873)

Other titles (25th–28th Barons): Marquess of Castelldosrius (Grandee of Spain), Marquess of Oris, Vavasour of Montescot, Castellan of the Castle of Angles, and Lord of the Castle of Vallgornera. (Note: The exact titles of the 27th Baron onwards are not registered and are thus assumed to have been inherited.)

- Carlos II de Sentmenat-Oms de Santa Pau y de Sentmenat, 25th Baron of Santa Pau (1862–1835)

Other titles (26th Baron): Head of the Houses of Dosrius, Oris, Vallgornera, Rocafort, Bellestar, Oms, Santa Pau, Montescot, Puiggener, and Rasset.

- Félix II de Sentmenat de Santa Pau y de Güell, 26th Baron of Santa Pau (1908–1990)
- Carlos de Sentmenat y Urruela, 27th Baron of Santa Pau (1934–2005)
- Santiago de Sentmenat y Urruela, 28th Baron of Santa Pau (1935–2020)

Other titles (29th Baroness onwards): Marquess of Castelldosrius (Grandee of Spain), Vavasour of Montescot, Castellan of the Castle of Angles, and Lord of the Castle of Vallgornera.

- Ágatha Ruiz de la Prada y Sentmenat, 29th Baroness of Santa Pau (born 1960)

The heir apparent is Tristán Jerónimo Ramírez Ruiz de la Prada (born 1987), eldest son of the 29th Baroness.

== Gallery ==
Barons of Santa Pau
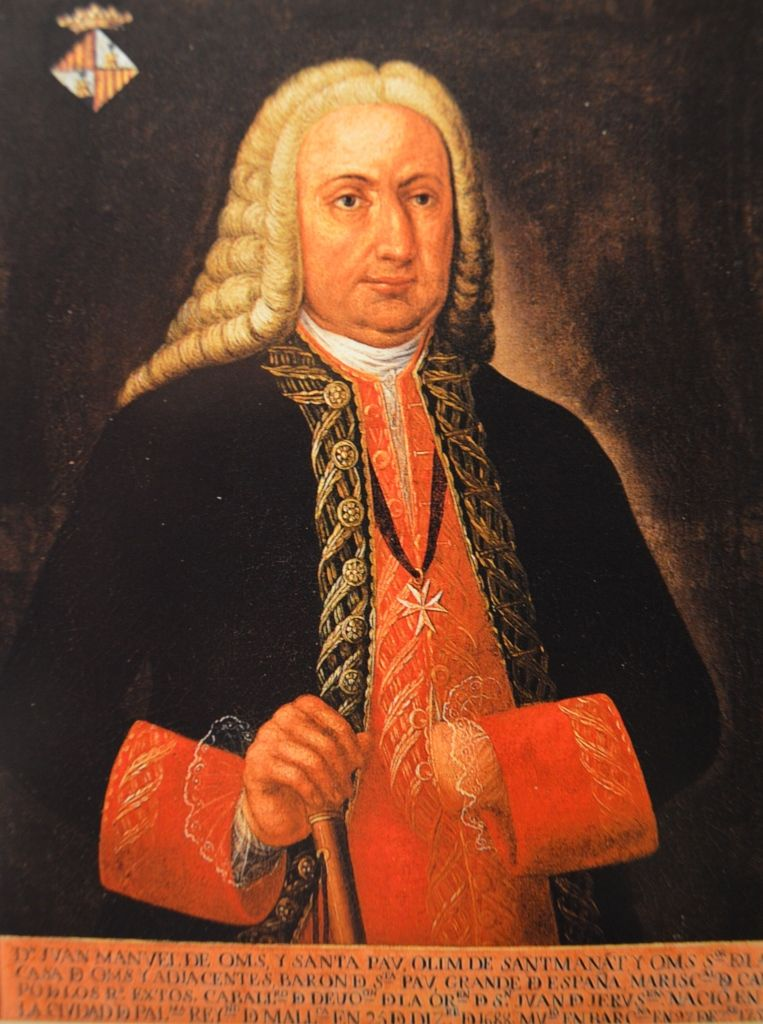
Manuel II de Sentmenat-Oms de Santa Pau y de Lanuza, 1st Marquess of Castelldosrius, 17th Baron of Santa Pau, etc.

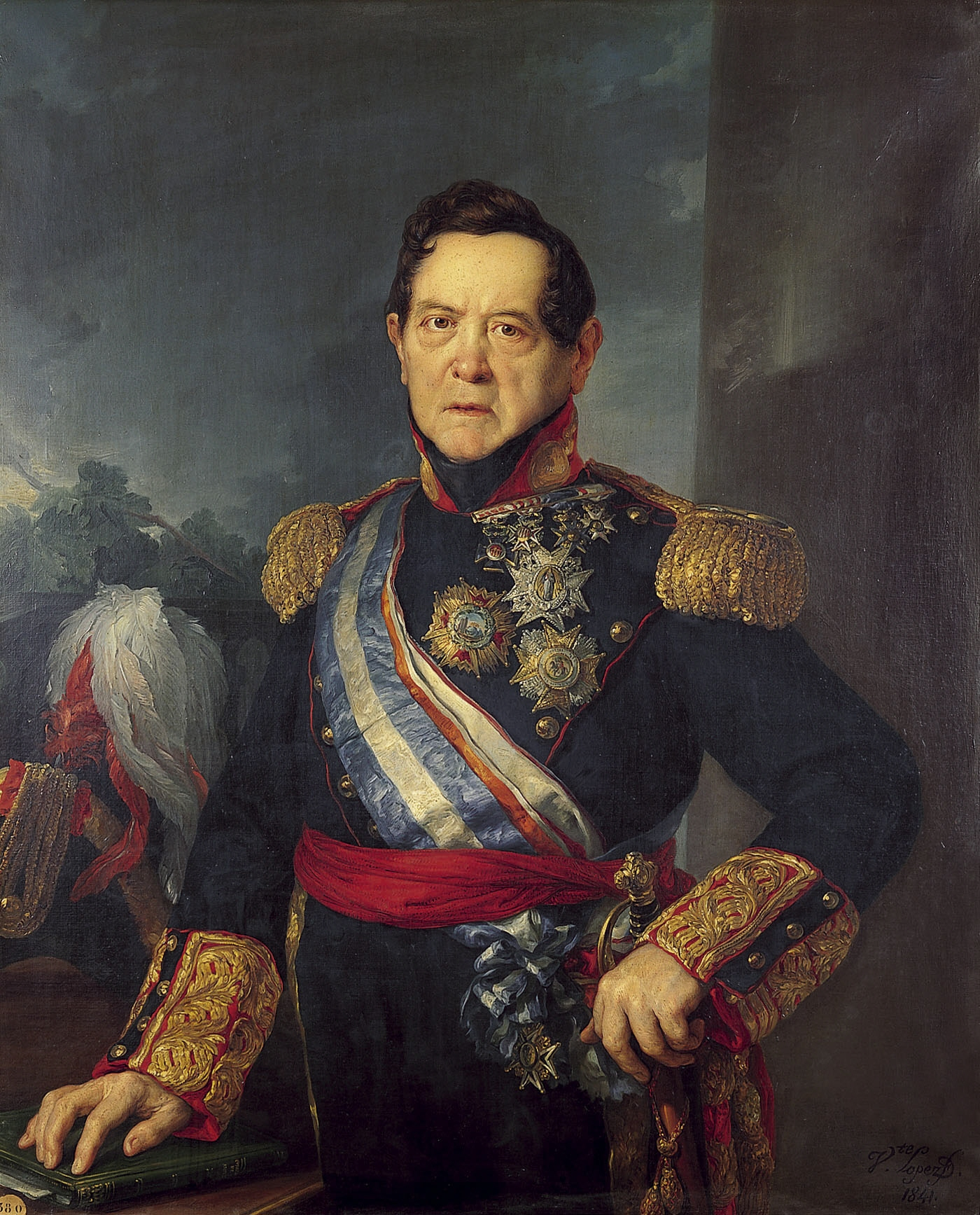
Francisco Javier I de Sentmenat-Oms de Santa Pau y de Vera, 21st Baron of Santa Pau

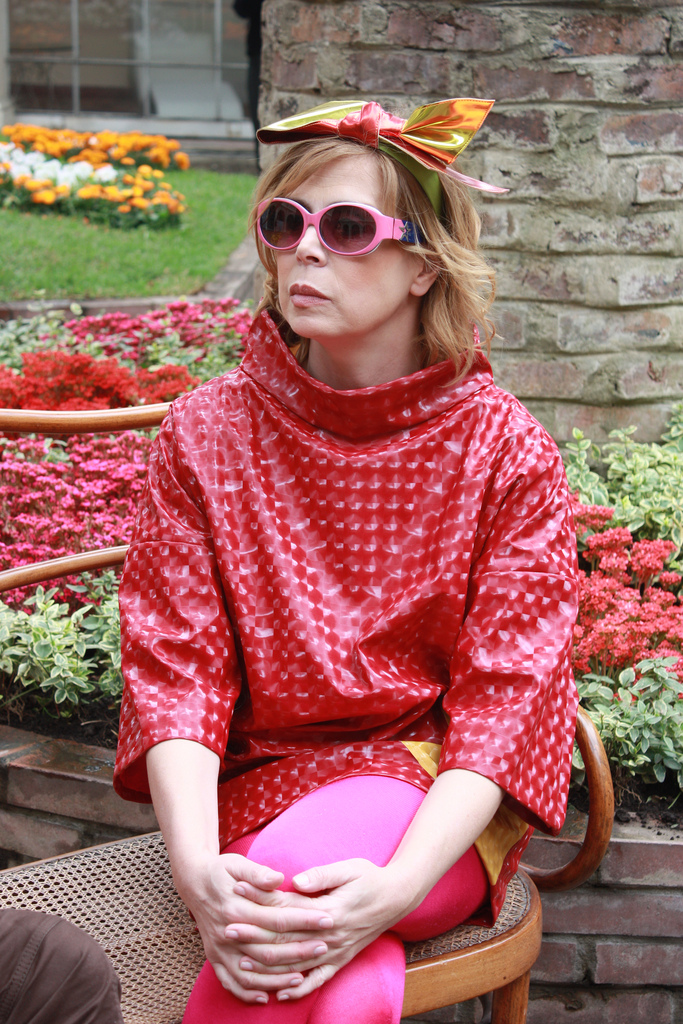
Ágatha Ruiz de la Prada y de Sentmenat, 13th Marchioness of Castelldosrius, 29th Baroness of Santa Pau, etc.

== Family Tree ==
Porqueras–Oms–Copóns Family Tree: Barons of Santa Pau
- Hugo I Ademar, Baron of Santa Pau (d. 1393)
  - Poncio V, Baron of Santa Pau (d. c. 1396)
  - Hugo II Ademar, Baron of Santa Pau (d. c. 1398)
  - Galcerán Ademar de Santa Pau, Baron of Santa Pau (d. 1438)
    - Hugo III Ademar de Santa Pau, Baron of Santa Pau (d. c. 1443)
  - Juana de Santa Pau
    - Berenguer V de Oms y de Santa Pau, Baron of Santa Pau
      - Guillermo de Oms de Santa Pau y de Fabra, Baron of Santa Pau (d. 1517)
        - Berenguer VI de Oms de Santa Pau y de Perapertussa, Baron of Santa Pau (d. 1541)
          - Berenguer de Oms de Santa Pau y de Sentmenat, Baron of Santa Pau
          - Antonio I de Oms de Santa Pau y de Sentmenat, Baron of Santa Sau (fl. 1543–1564)
            - Antonio II de Oms y Santa Pau y Salbá, Baron of Santa Pau (d. 1713)
            - Ana de Oms-Santa Pau y Salvá
              - Galceran de Sentmenat y Oms
                - Enrique de Sentmenat y de Lanuza, Baron of Dosrius
                  - Manuel II de Sentmenat-Oms de Santa Pau y de Lanuza, 17th Baron of Santa Pau (1651–1710)
                    - See below: Sentmenat Barons of Santa Pau
            - Berenguer VII de Oms-Santa Pau y de Calders, 11th Baron of Santa Pau (d. 1596)
              - Berenguer VIII de Oms-Santa Pau y de Sentmenat, Baron of Santa Pau (d. c. 1653)
              - Antonio III de Oms-Santa Pau y de Sentmenat, Baron of Santa Pau
                - Raimundo de Oms y de Santa Pau, Baron of Santa Pau (d. 1713)
                - Maria Teresa de Oms de Santa Pau, Baroness of Santa Pau (d. 1713)
                  - Antonio de Oms de Cabrera y de Oms, Baron of Santa Pau (fl. 1705)
                    - Cayetana de Oms y Sarriera, Baroness of Santa Pau
                      - Cayetano Luís de Copóns y Oms, 3rd Marquess of Moyá of the Tower, Baron of Santa Pau (d. 1753)
                      - José de Copóns y Oms, 4th Marquess of Moyá of the Tower, Baron of Santa Pau
                        - María Josefa de Copóns y Cartellá, 5th Marchioness of Moyá of the Tower, Baroness of Santa Pau
                          - María de Sarriera y de Copóns, 6th Marchioness of Moyá of the Tower, Baroness of Santa Pau
                        - Josefa de Sarriera y de Copóns, 7th Marchioness of Moyá of Latorre, Baroness of Santa Pau (d. 1865)
Sentmenat Family Tree: Barons of Santa Pau
- Manuel II de Sentmenat-Oms de Santa Pau y de Lanuza, 17th Baron of Santa Pau (1651–1710)
  - Félix I de Sentmenat-Oms de Santa Pau y de Oms, 18th Baron of Santa Pau (1684–1744)
  - Juan I Manuel de Sentmenat-Oms de Santa Pau y de Oms, 19th Baron of Santa Pau (1687–1754)
    - Manuel III de Sentmenat-Oms de Santa Pau y de Cartellá, 20th Baron of Santa Pau (1730–1796)
      - Francisco Javier I de Sentmenat-Oms de Santa Pau y de Vera, 21st Baron of Santa Pau (1767–1842)
  - José de Sentmenat y de Oms (1695–1766)
    - Pedro Martín de Sentmenat y de Copóns (1740–1817)
      - Carlos de Sentmenat y Puiggener-Orís, Barón de Oris, 18th Lord of Vallgornera (1771–1802)
        - Pedro-Carlos I de Sentmenat-Oms de Santa Pau y Riquer, 22nd Baron of Santa Pau (1740–1817)
        - Carlos I de Sentmenat-Oms de Santa Pau y de Riquer, 23rd Baron of Santa Pau (1794–1856)
          - Ramón I de Sentmenat-Oms de Santa Pau y de Sáenz-Ramírez, 24th Baron of Santa Pau (1842–1873)
            - Carlos II de Sentmenat-Oms de Santa Pau y de Sentmenat, 25th Baron of Santa Pau (1862–1835)
              - Félix II de Sentmenat de Santa Pau y de Güell, 26th Baron of Santa Pau (1908–1990)
                - Carlos de Sentmenat y Urruela, 27th Baron of Santa Pau (1934–2005)
                - María Isabel de Sentmenat y Urruela (1935–2005)
                  - Ágatha Ruiz de la Prada y Sentmenat, 29th Baroness of Santa Pau (b. 1960)
                    - (1) Tristán Jerónimo Ramírez Ruiz de la Prada (b. 1960)
                    - (2) Olivia Cósima Ramírez Ruiz de la Prada (b. 1990)
                - Santiago de Sentmenat y Urruela, 28th Baron of Santa Pau (1935–2020)
                  - (3) Ana Isabel de Sentmenat Vilá, 5th Marchioness of Oris

== Bibliography ==
- de Fluviá y Escorsa, Armando (May–June 1967). "La casa de Sentmenat. Línea de los marqueses de Castelldosrius, grandes de España". Hidalguía (in Spanish) (82): 353–376.
- Monsalvatje y Fossas, Francisco (1919). Los castillos del condado de Besalú. Olot.
- Monsalvatje y Fossas, Francisco (1891). Santa Pau y lugares que componían su antigua Baronía. Olot.
- Morales Roca, Francisco José (1983). Próceres habilitados en las Cortes del Principado de Cataluña, siglo XVII (1599–1713). Madrid: Hidalguía. p. 1516. ISBN 8400054318.<
- Negre i Pastell, Pelai (1962). "El testamento de doña Violante de Cruilles y de Santa Pau: Notas genealógico-históricas del linaje Cruilles de Santa Pau". Annals de l'Institut d'Estudis Gironins (in Spanish) (15): 261. ISSN 0213-6228.
- Reixach, Salvador (1998). Santa Pau. Girona: Diputació de Girona. ISBN 84-86812-91-7.
- Castan i Ranch, Amèlia (1993). "Nobleza y poder en la Cataluña de la época moderna: una aproximación biográfica al primer Marqués de Castelldosrius (1651-1710)". Pedralbes (in Spanish) (13-I): 265.
