= Agustí Torelló =

Agustí Torelló (1863–1932) was a Catalán violinist, conductor, composer and music teacher. He was born in Sant Sadurní d'Anoia on November 21, 1863, and died in Barcelona on December 13, 1932.

== Career ==
Agustí Torelló came from a family of musicians, his grandfather and father had been bass players in local groups, and his brother Antoni was a renowned bassist. He still had other musician brothers, such as Raphael and Pere Torello and Ros, a second cousin. Antoni Torelló y Romeu was violin director of the local Els Escolans orchestra. He played violin with the Els Escolans family orchestra. Later, he moved to Barcelona, where he led the Barcelona Symphony Orchestra and the Lyceum (already in 1895), and was soloist with the Pau Casals Orquesta.

In 1899 he was president of the Music Center of Barcelona. In 1901 he announced that he was leaving his post as director of the Artistic Union orchestra. Shortly afterwards, and together with his brother Pere the bassist, he founded his own Philharmonic Union, which he led between 1901 and 1930. He also devoted himself to teaching music, and in 1897 was admitted as a professor of violin at the Music School. In 1920 he was at the Liceo Conservatory, for many years he was announced in the Barcelona press as a violin tutor.

He composed the American La Campesina, for piano (1889) and Niceta (around 1891).

== Children ==
Agustí Torelló and his son Josep Maria were members of the Barcelonan Economic Society of Friends of the Country. His daughter Mercè Torelló y Solà played the harp in the Lyceum orchestra. He still had a third child, named Agustí.
