= Josep Puig i Cadafalch =

Catalan architect (1867–1957)

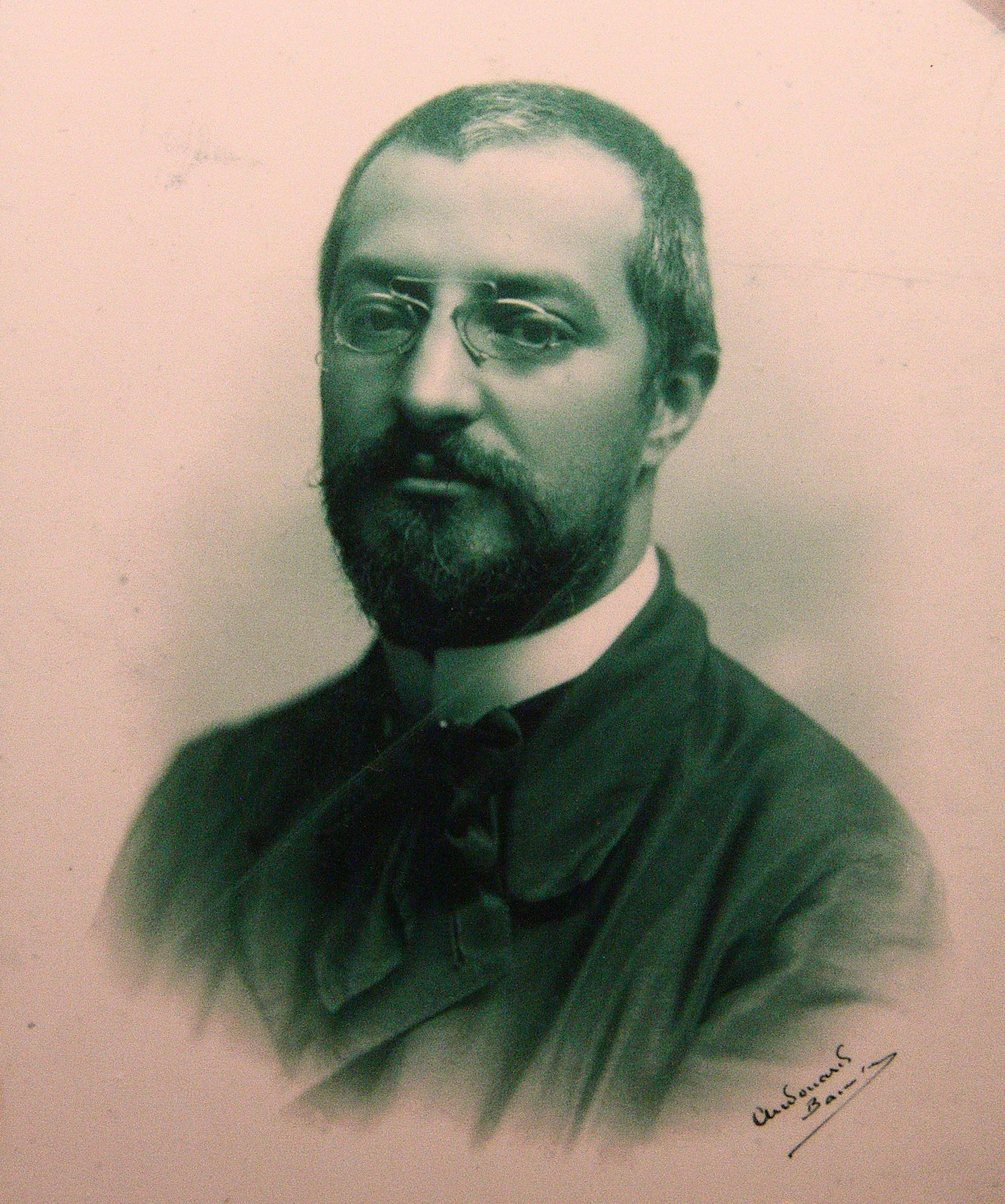
- Born: 17 October 1867; Mataró, Spain
- Died: 21 December 1956 (aged 89); Barcelona, Spain
- Occupation: Architect

Josep Puig i Cadafalch (Catalan: [ʒuˈzɛp ˈpudʒ i kəðəˈfalk]; 17 October 1867 in Mataró – 21 December 1956 in Barcelona) was a Spanish architect who designed many significant buildings in Barcelona, and a politician who had a significant role in the development of Catalan regional institutions.

== Life and activities ==
He was born on 17 October 1867 in Mataró.

He was the architect of the Casa Martí (also known as "Els Quatre Gats"), which became a place of ideas, projects and social gatherings for such well-known artists as Santiago Rusiñol and Ramon Casas.

Although Puig i Cadafalch's style separated him significantly from his contemporary Gaudí, their relations were neither tense nor problematic, as demonstrated by the participation of both architects in the construction of the Cafe Torino. Another of his significant buildings was the Casa Terrades (also known as "les Punxes"), which is known for its medieval castle style from the north of Europe.

He was also a great defender of Catalan culture and history which he hoped to see fully restored. He published studies of language, legal order and political organisation in the 11th–12th centuries. Amongst his important legacies is also the documentation and photographing of the culturally important buildings and art works the Vall d'Aran and Alta Ribagorça (including the Romanesque Churches of the Vall de Boí) during an expedition sponsored by the Institute for Catalan Studies in 1907.

Puig i Cadalfach was actively involved in politics. He was a Barcelona City Councillor from 1901 to 1903, served in the Spanish Parliament from 1907 to 1910 and was the second president of the Commonwealth of Catalonia from 1917. Like other leaders of Catalan nationalism, Puig i Cadafalch supported Primo de Rivera's coup d'état in 1923. In fact, once the coup was consummated, he was one of the Catalan authorities who went to the train station to bid farewell to General Miguel Primo de Rivera when he moved to Madrid to assume the leadership of the government. Despite this, in January 1924 he was removed from office by the new regime and replaced by Alfonso Sala.

From 1942 to his death in 1956, he was the president of the academic institution of the Catalan language, the Institut d'Estudis Catalans.

== Main works ==
=== Andorra ===
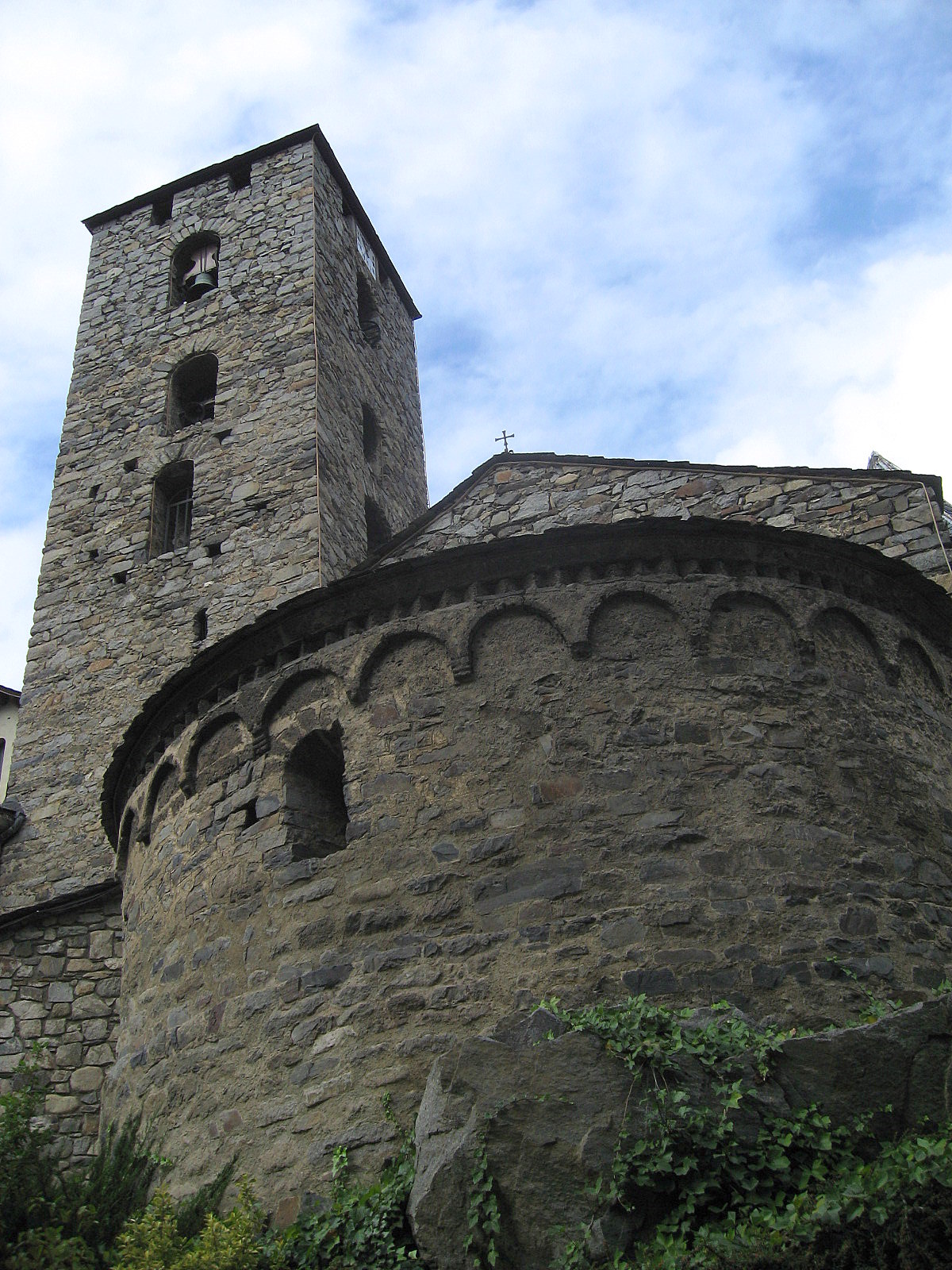
Year	Name	Location	Description	Condition	Image
1940	Església de Sant Esteve	Andorra la Vella; 42°30′26″N 01°31′18″E	Reconstruction of the upper floor of the tower and the old side door of the Romanesque church.	Good

=== Argentona ===
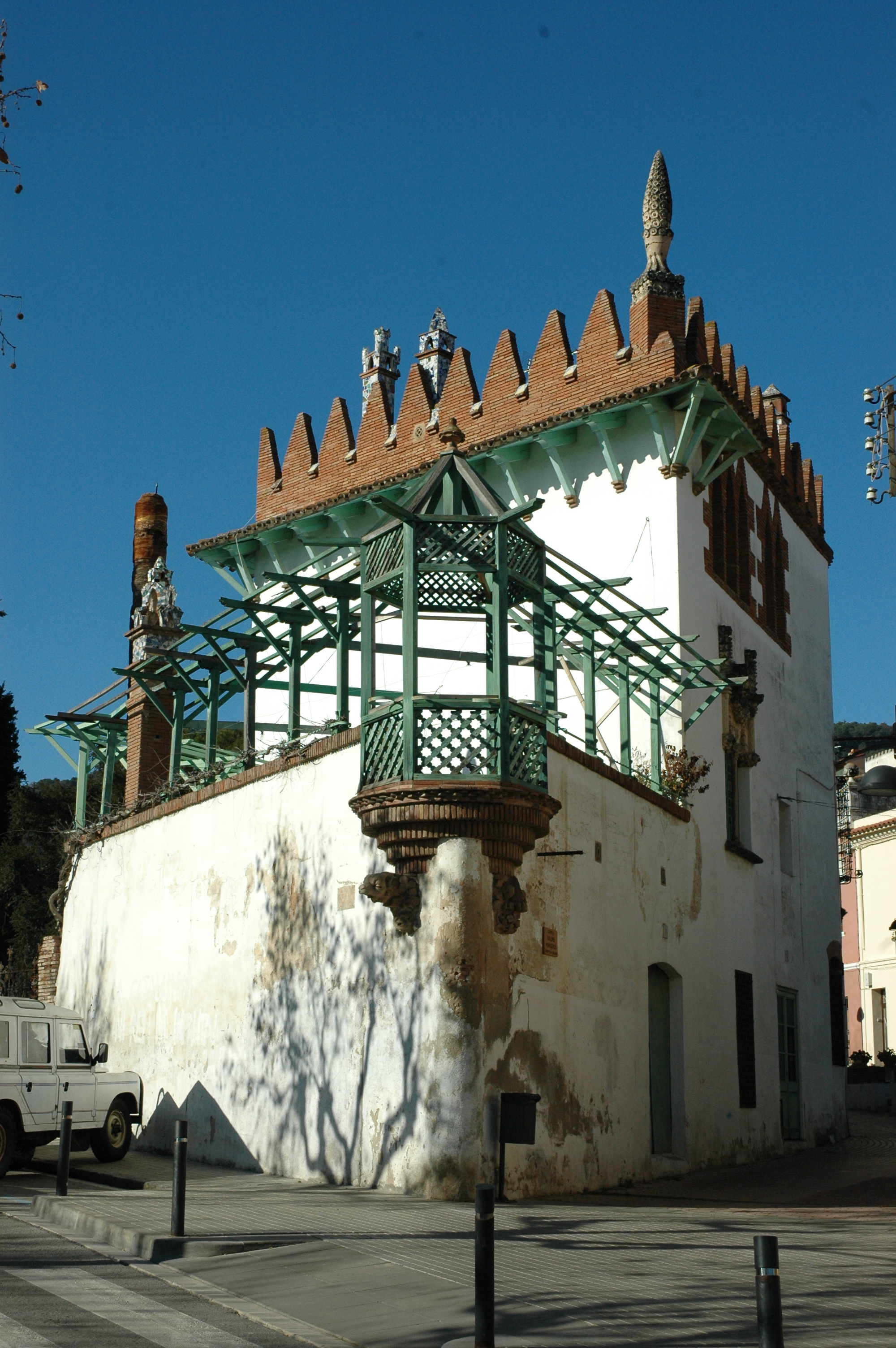
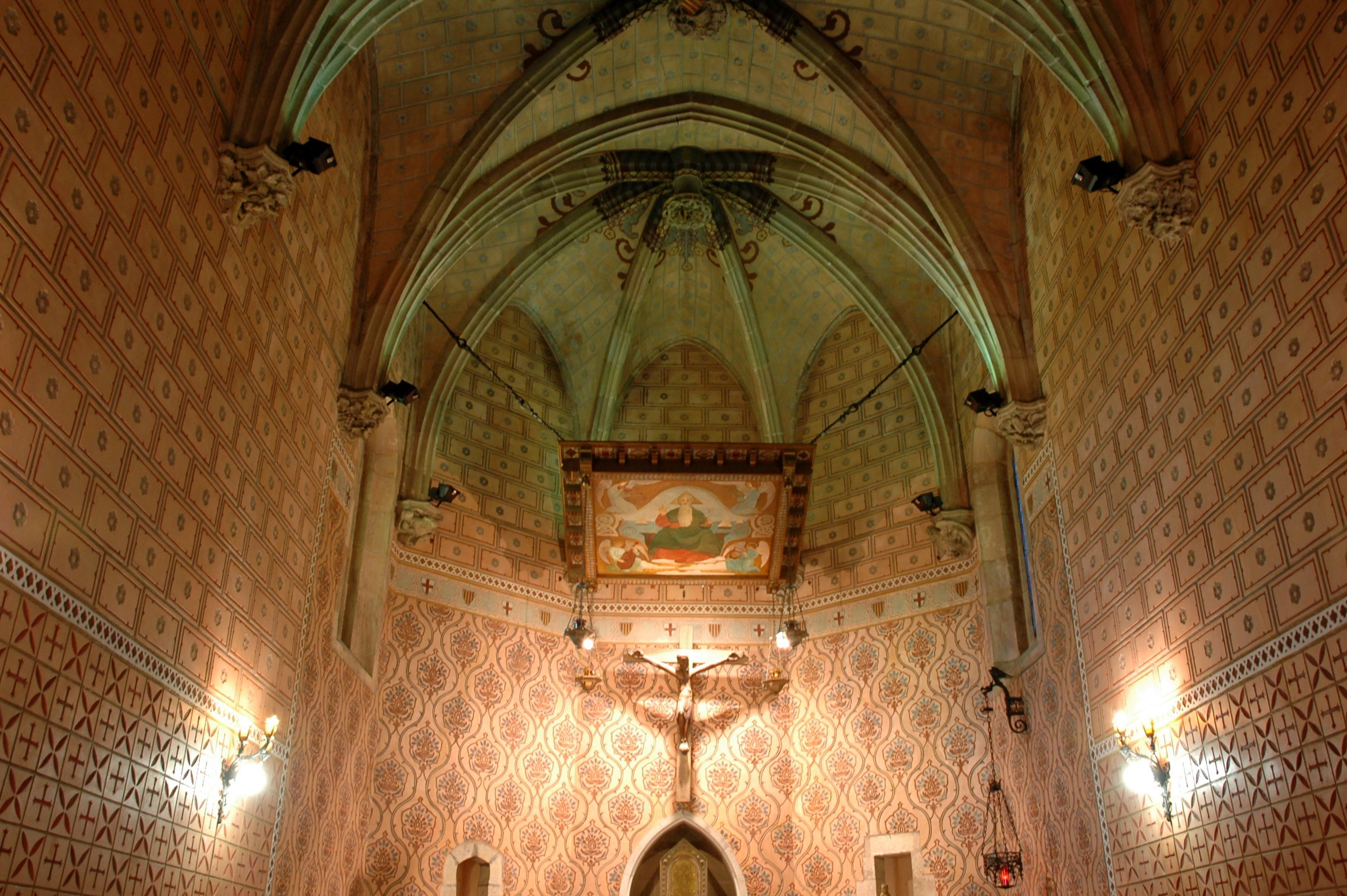
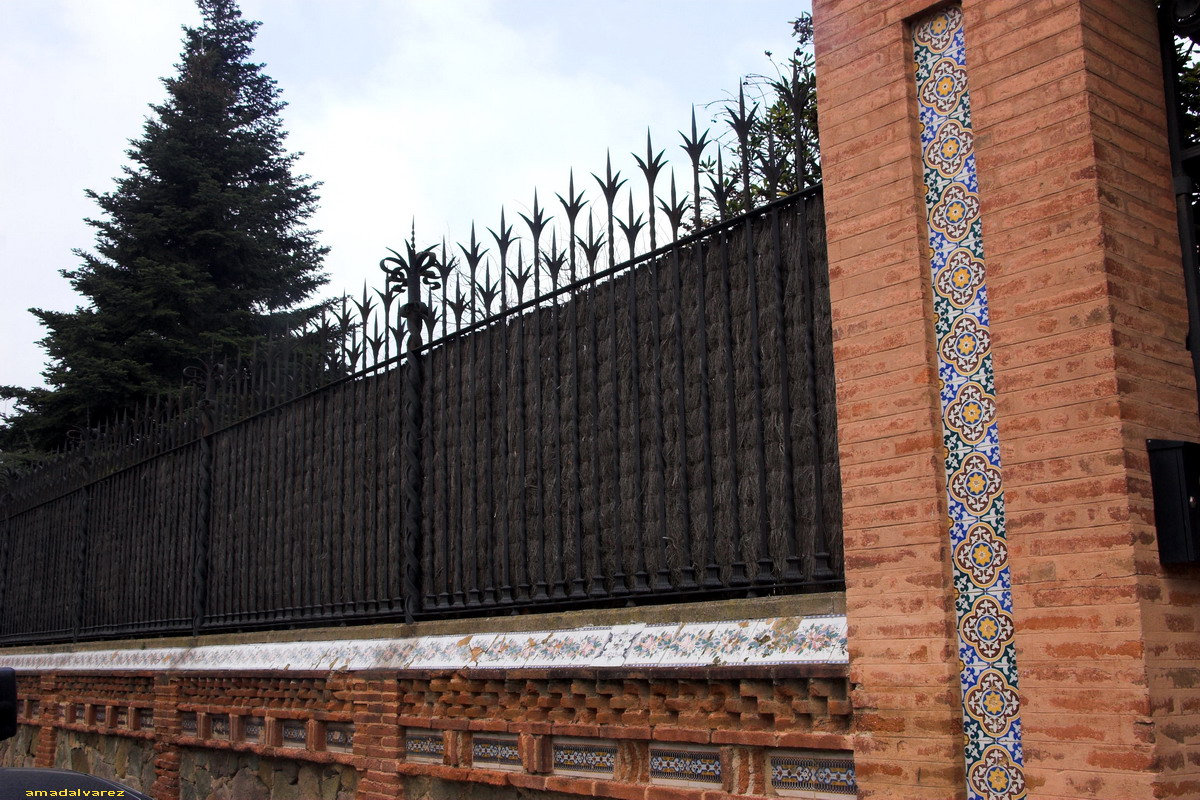
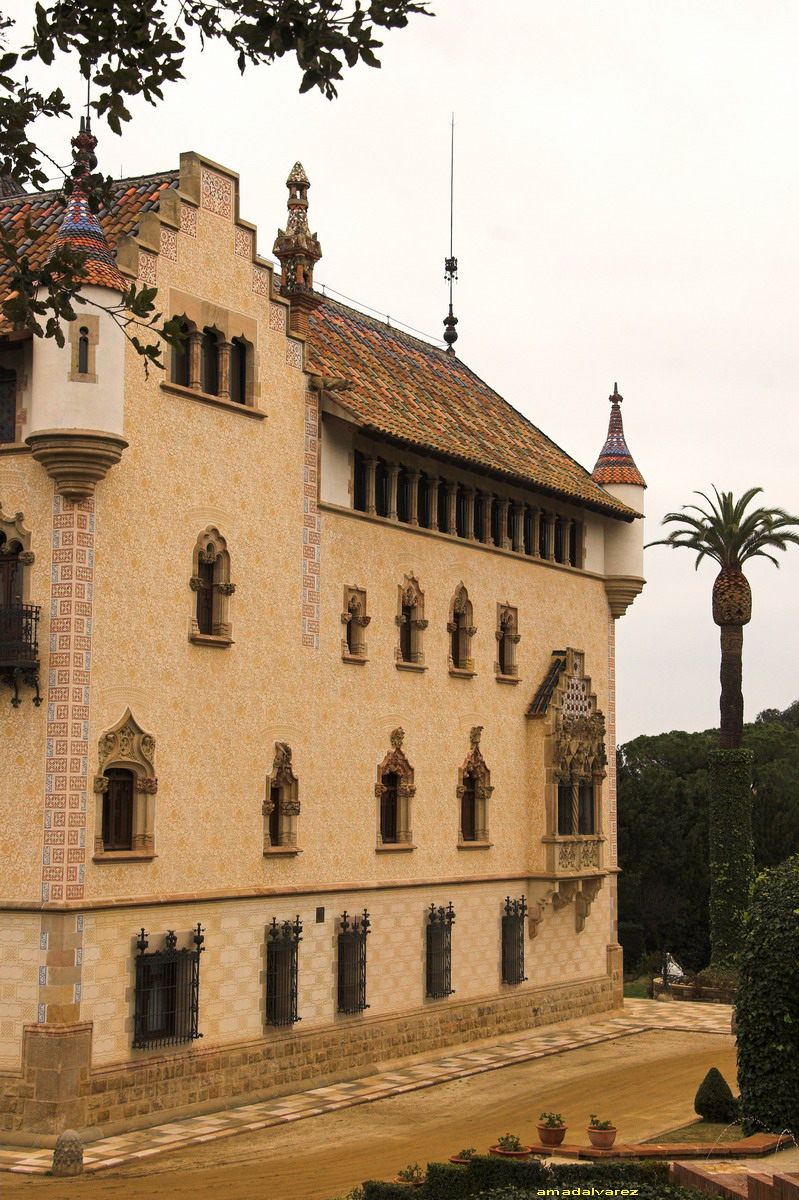
Year	Name	Location	Description	Condition	Image
1897–1905	Casa Puig i Cadafalch	Plaça de Vendre s/n 41°33′17.17″N 2°24′01.17″E	Summer house of the architect made from the transformation from three buildings. With a labyrinthine interior and a style of medieval influence, and has a façade with modernisme architectural elements.	Regular
1897	Chapel del Sagrament	Plaça de l'Església; 41°33′15″N 2°24′3″E	Expansion of the chapel del Sagrament of the Church of Sant Julià d'Argentona. The exterior of the chapel is decorated with gargoyles and an eaves tile modernists.	Very good
1898	Can Calopa	C. Riudemeia, 8; 41°33′12.65″N 2°24′2.36″E	Reforms in an existing house. The wrought iron fence and brick, the façade made of brick and a room decorated with modernisme elements mediated by Puig i Cadafalch.	Good
1898	Casa Garí	Camí de Sant Miquel del Cros, 9; 41°32′9.35″N 2°24′46.50″E	Manor house converted by Puig i Cadafalch to a noble palace, presenting all of the advanced aesthetic currents of the moment.	Very good

=== Barcelona ===
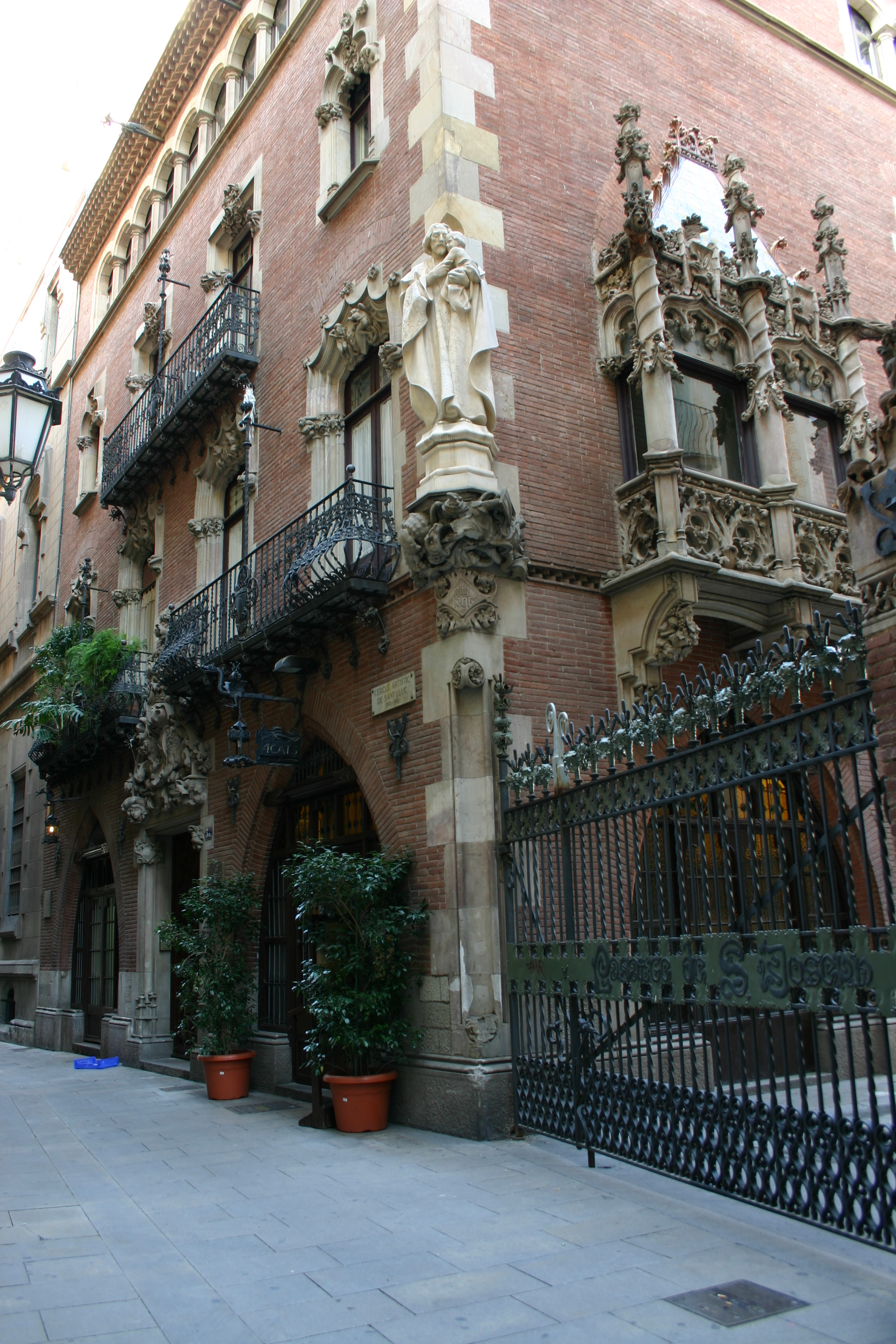
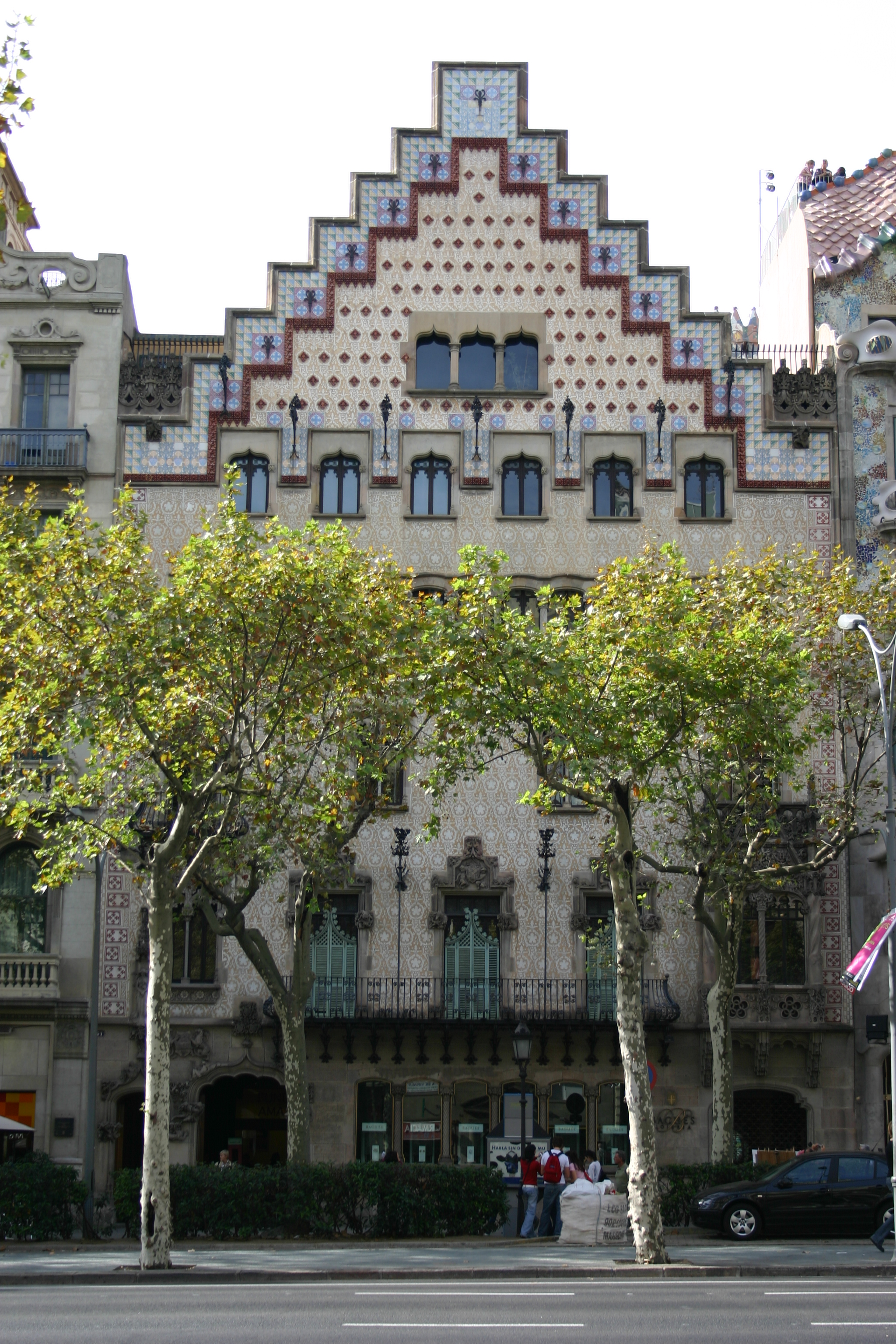
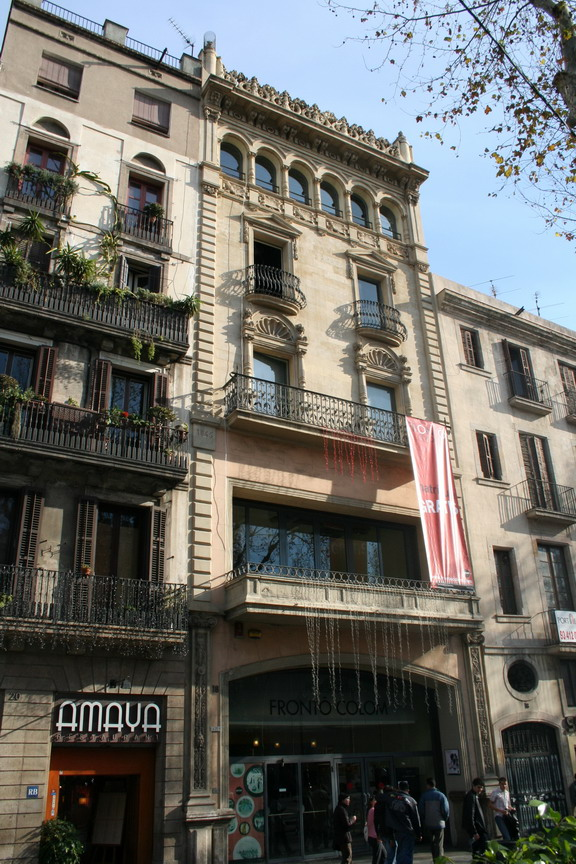
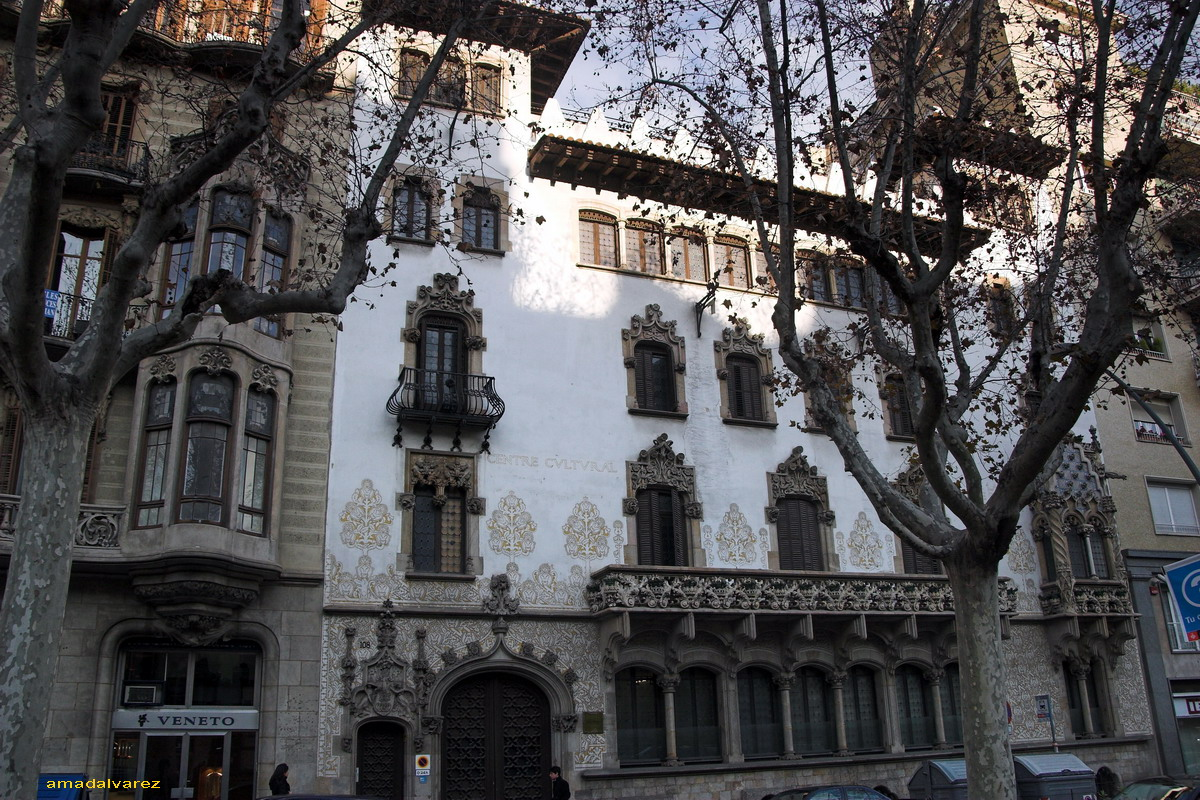
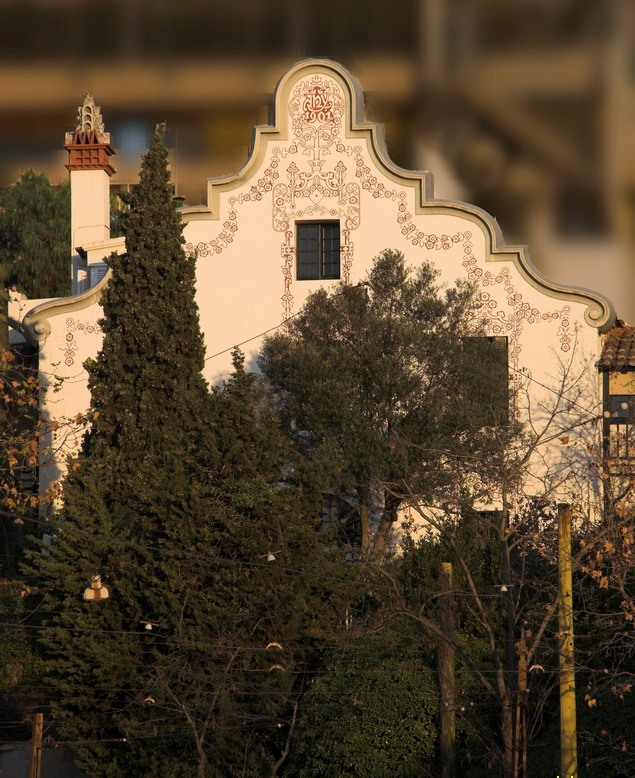
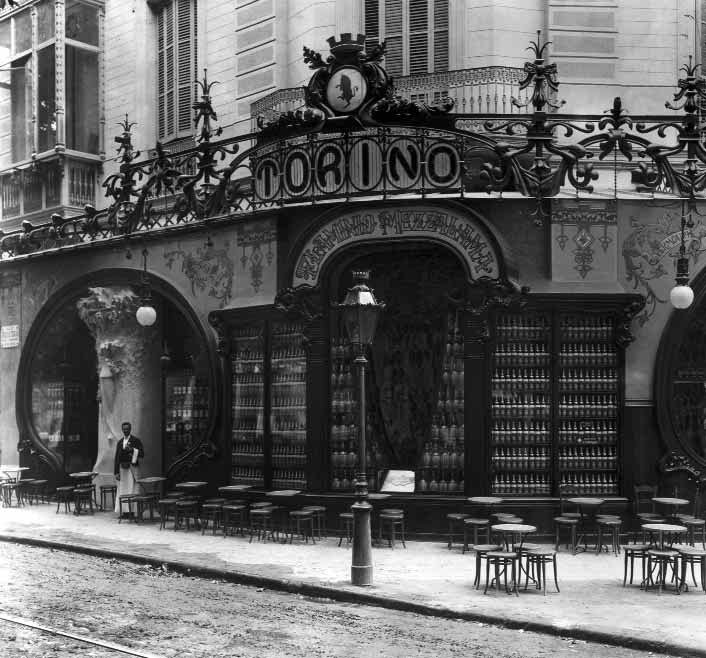
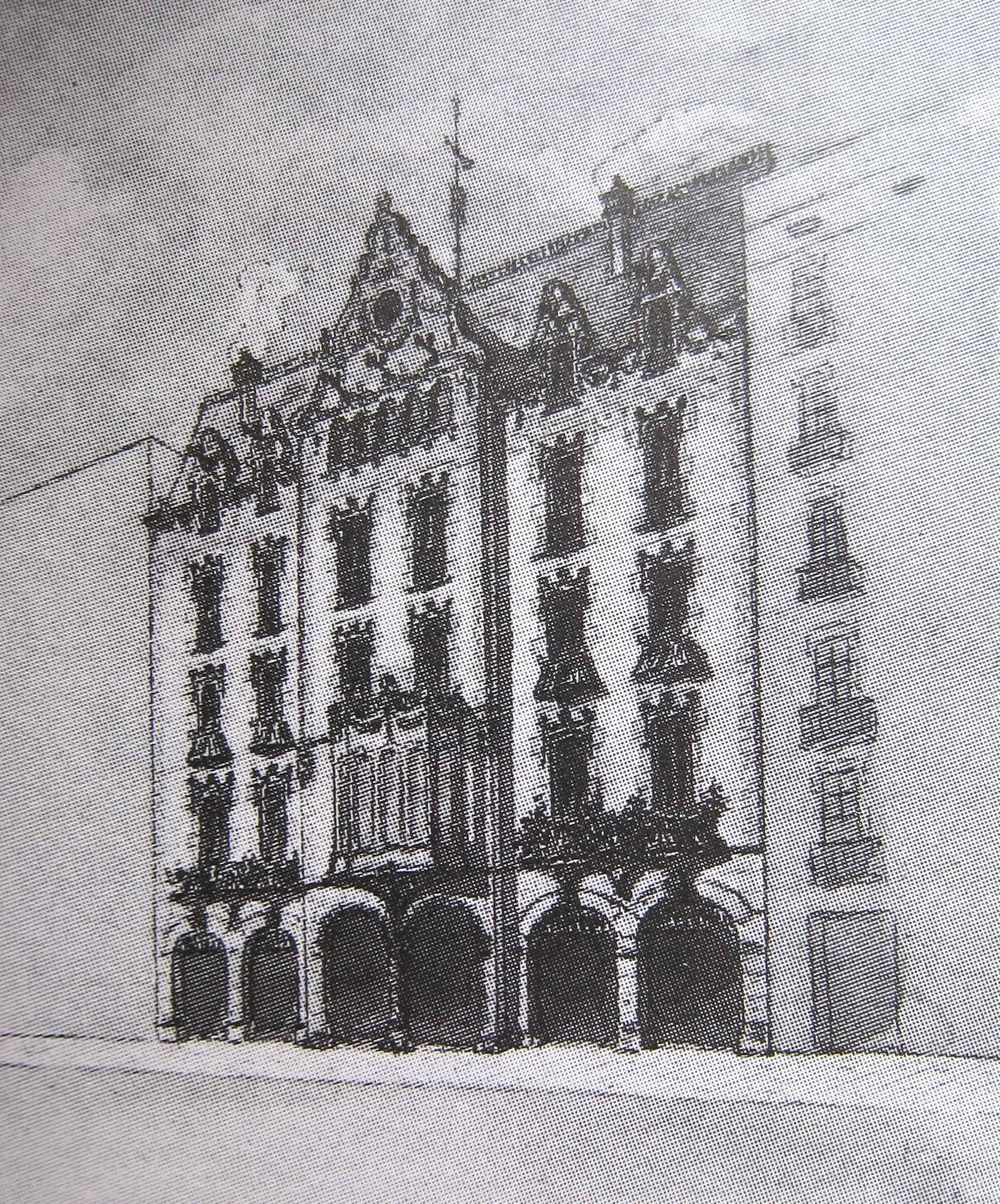
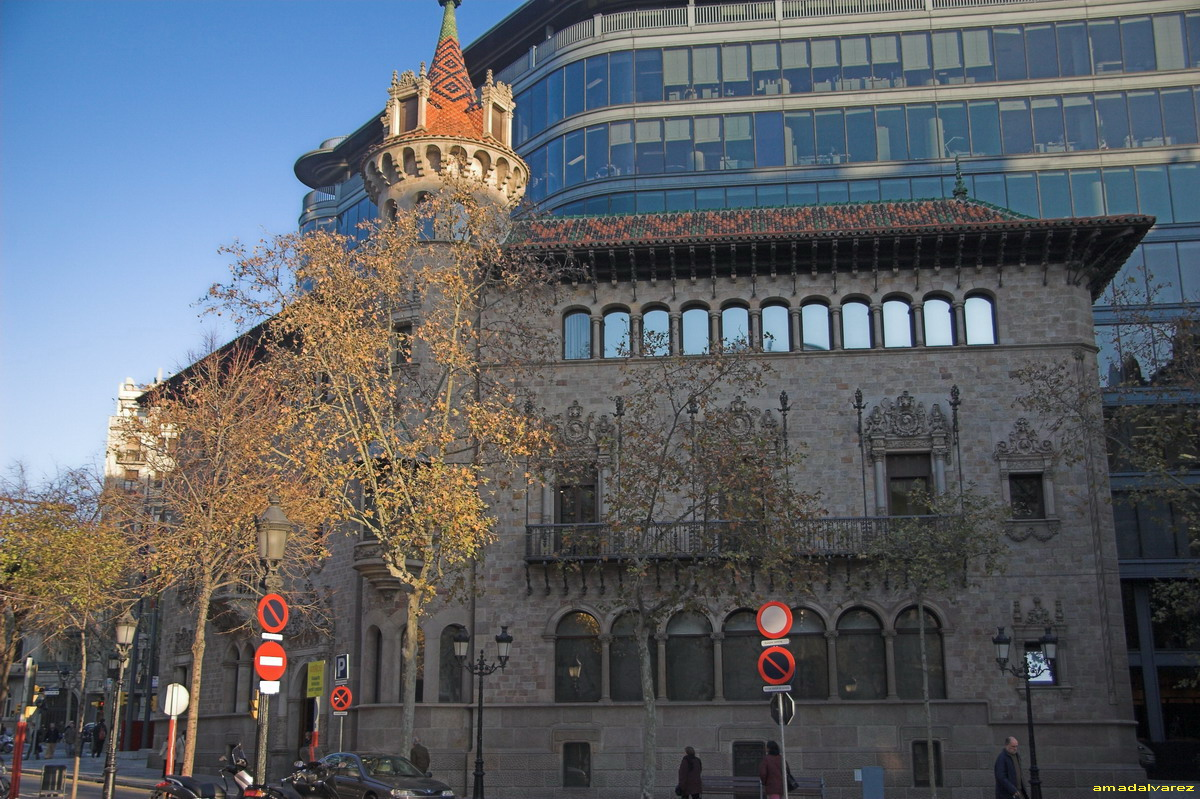
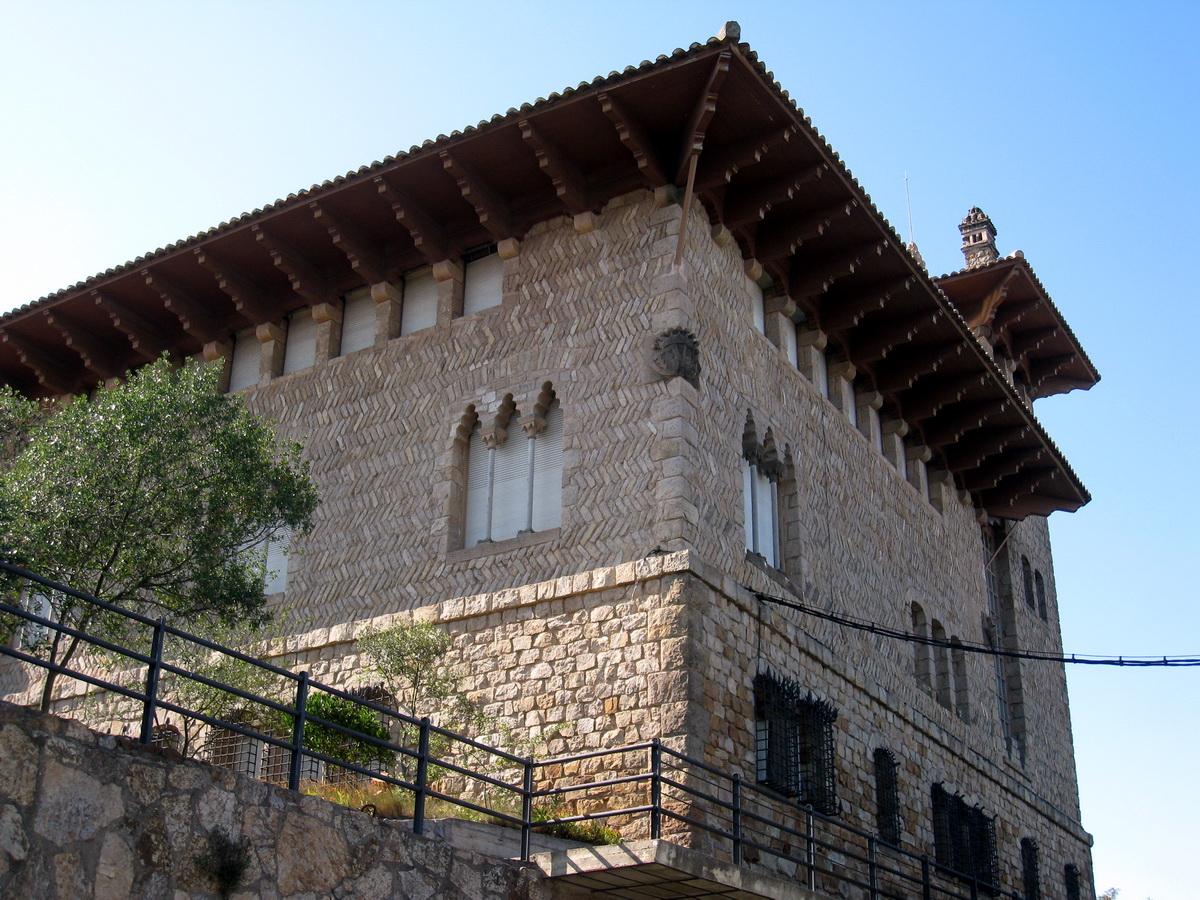
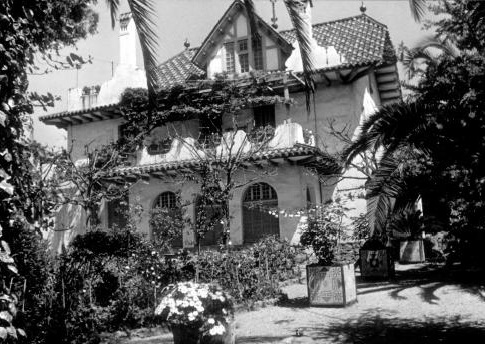
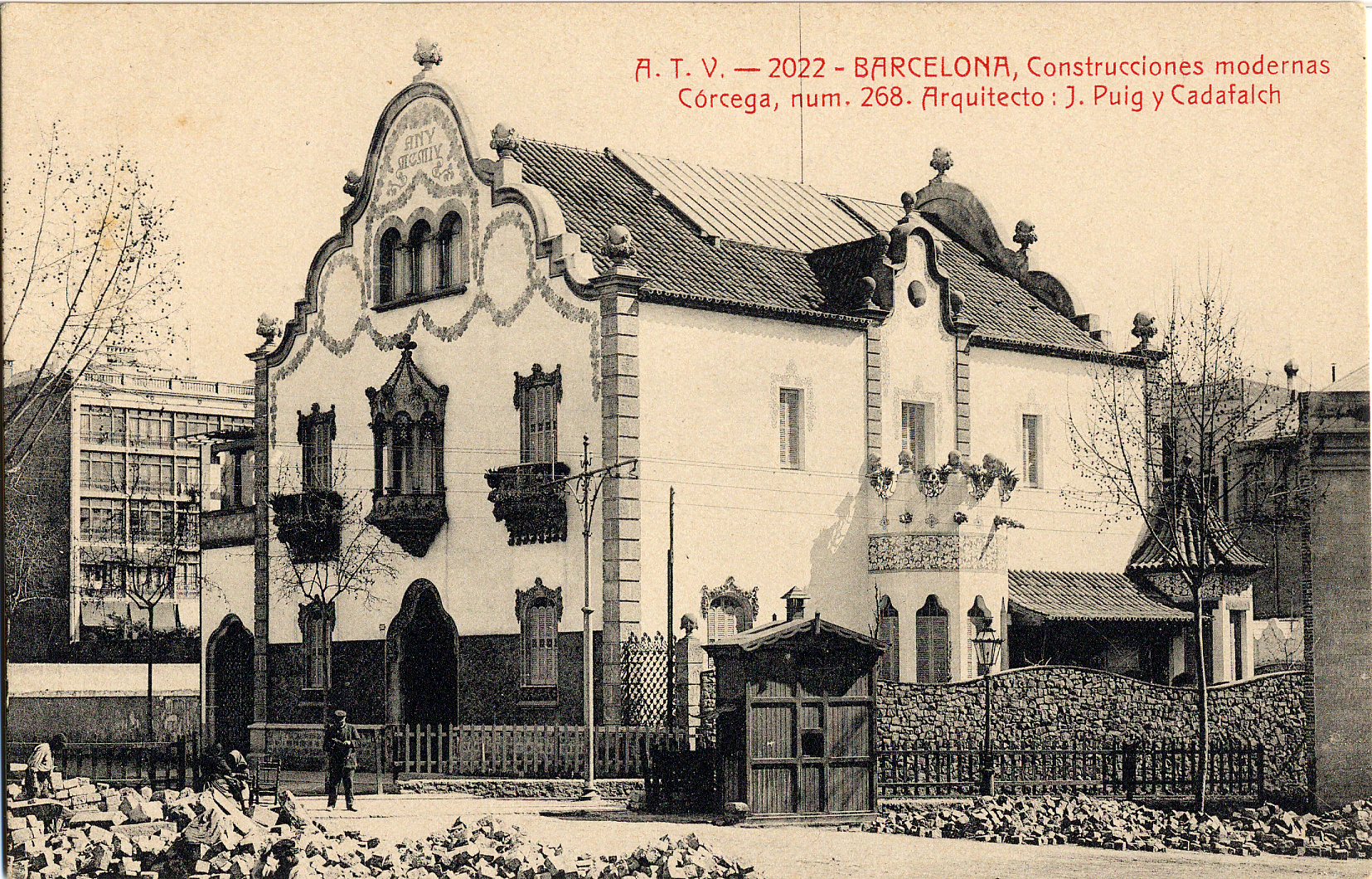
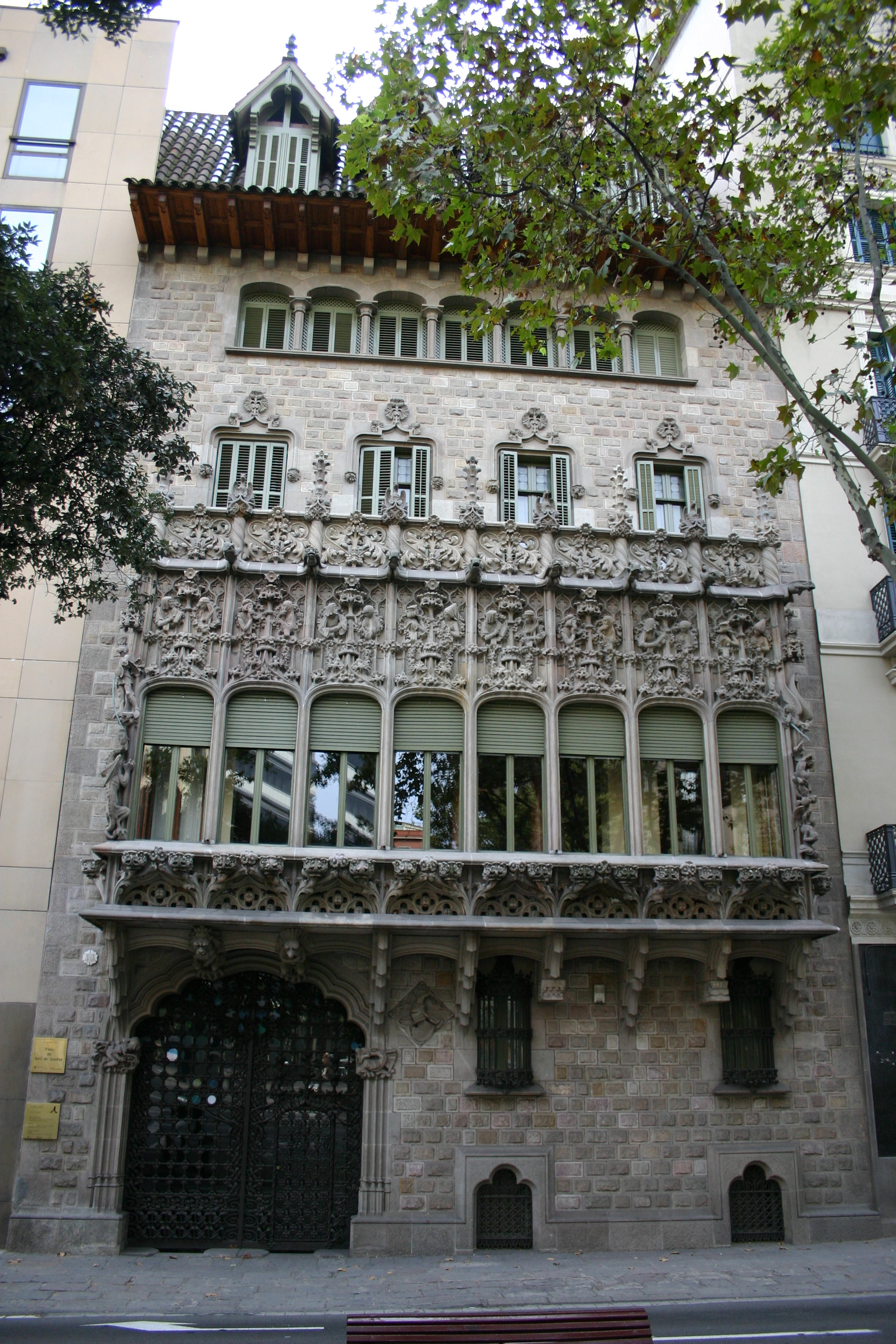
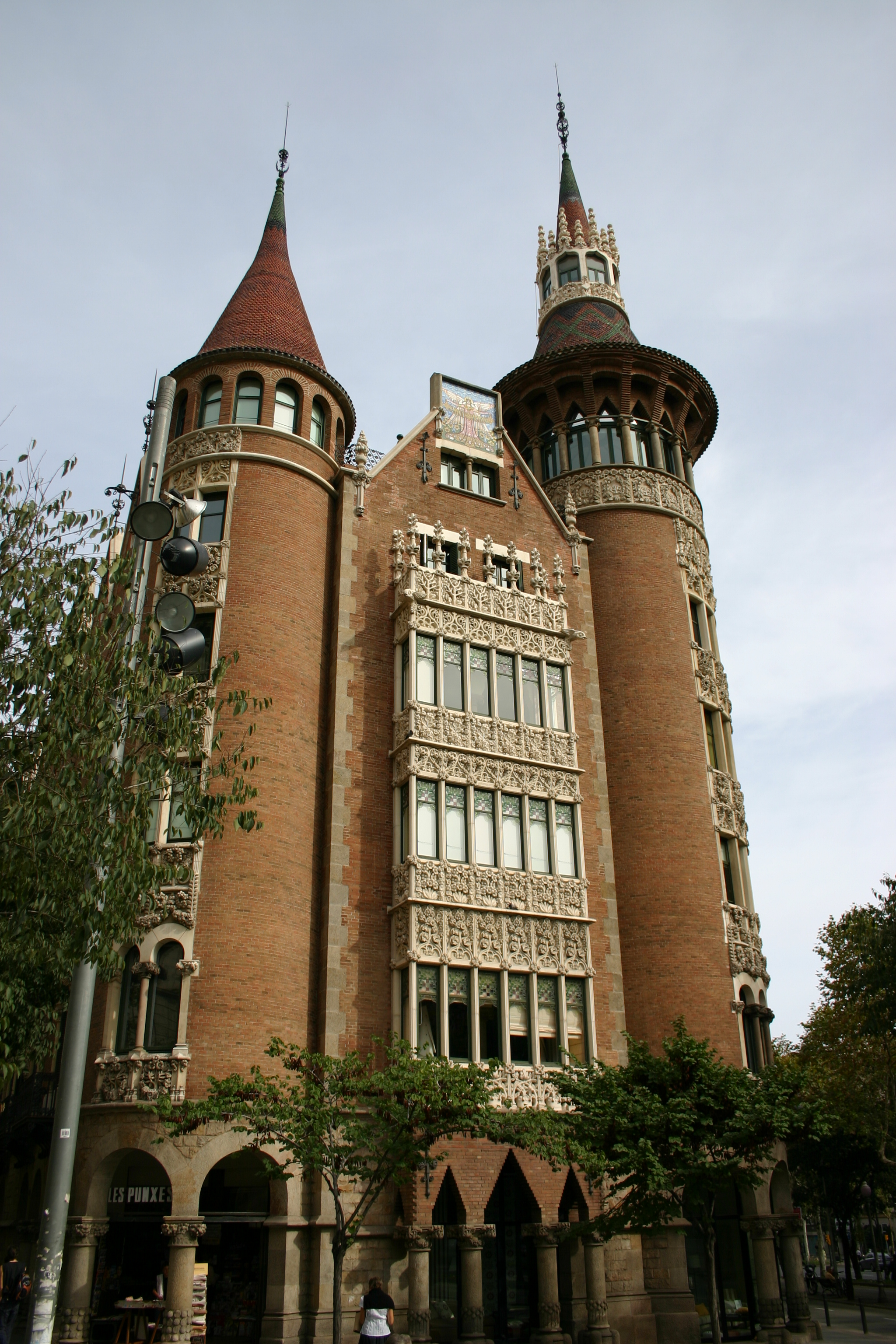
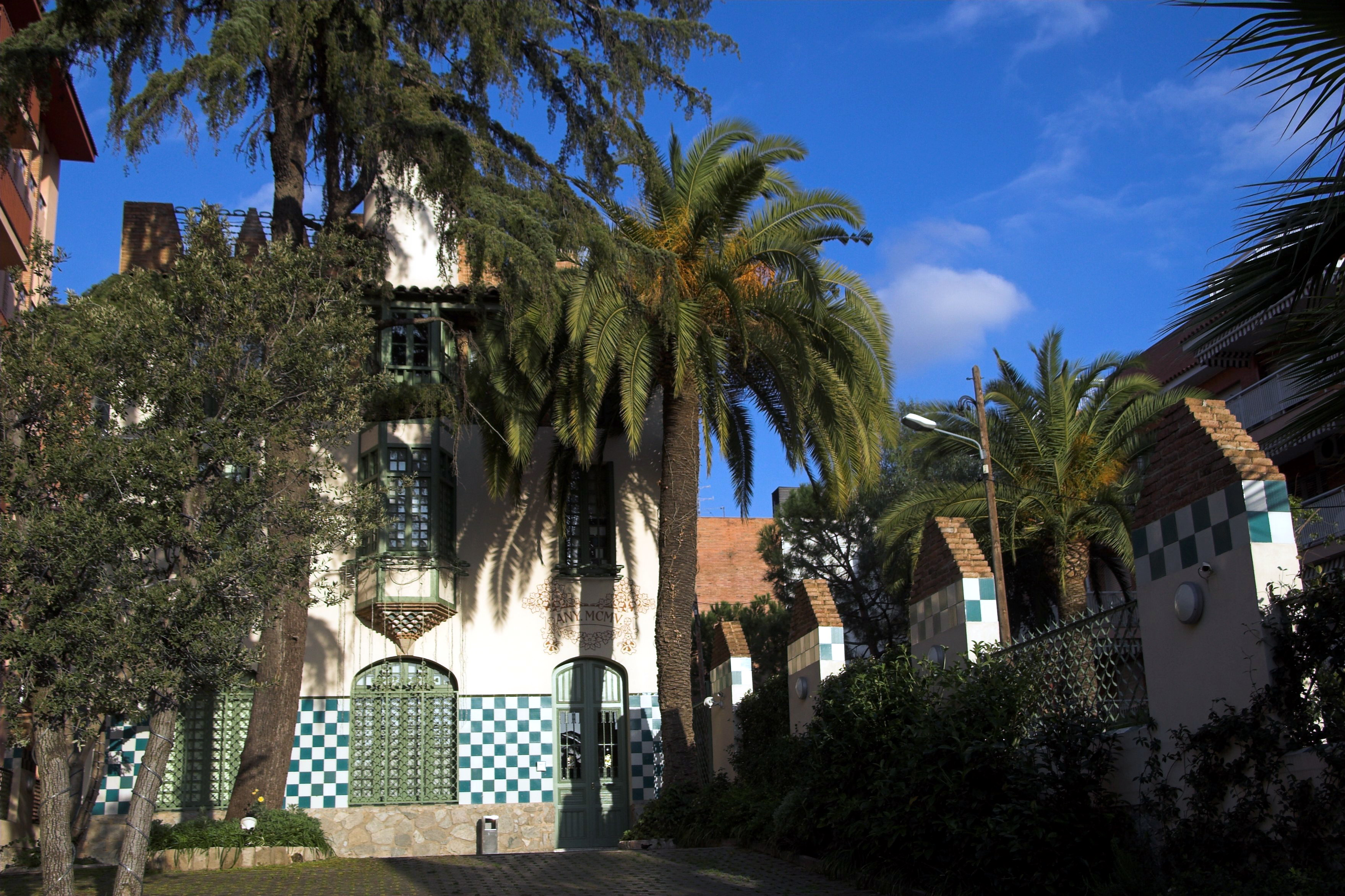
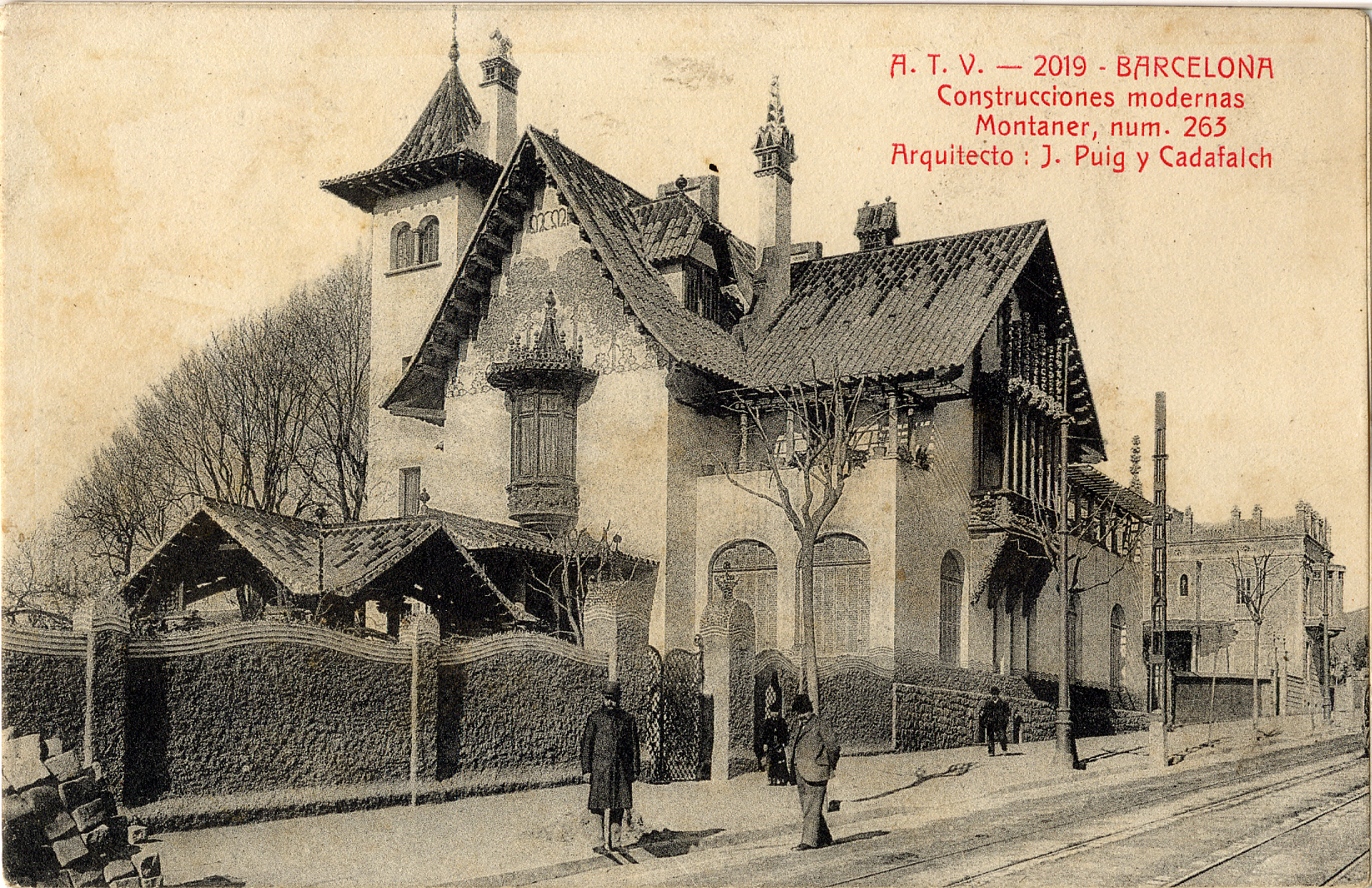
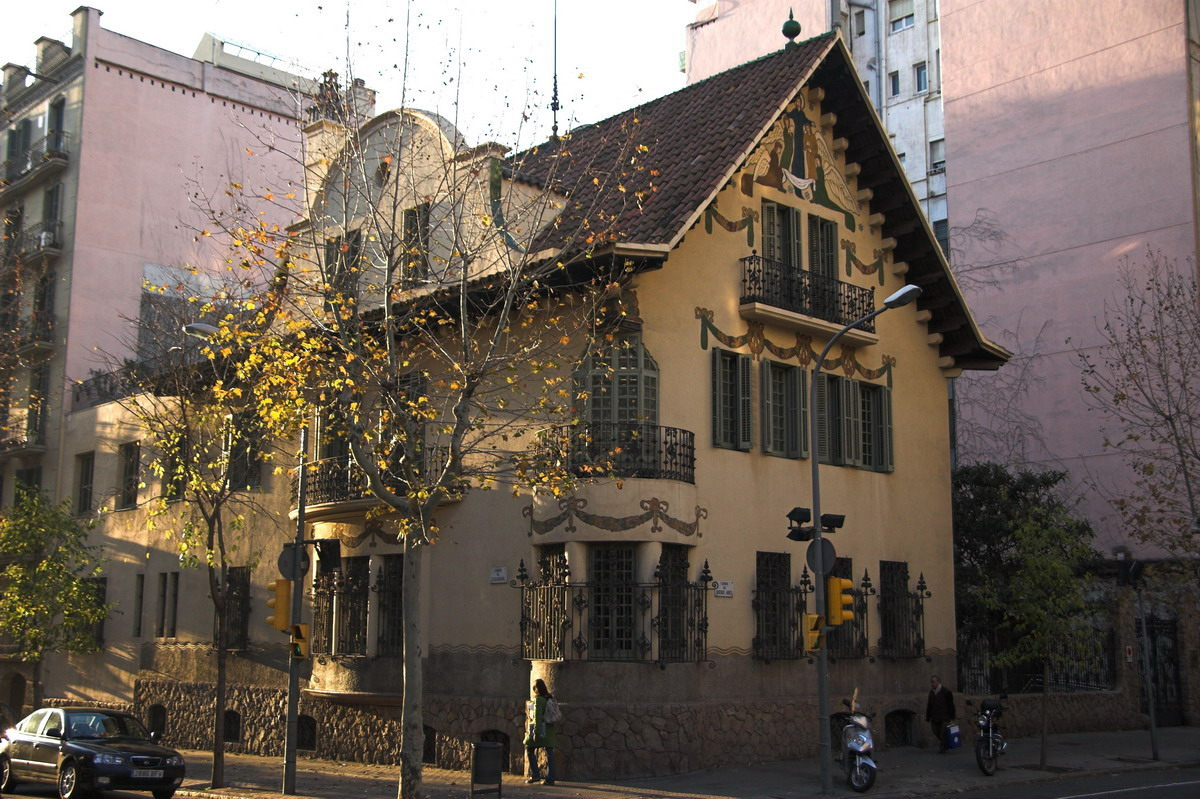
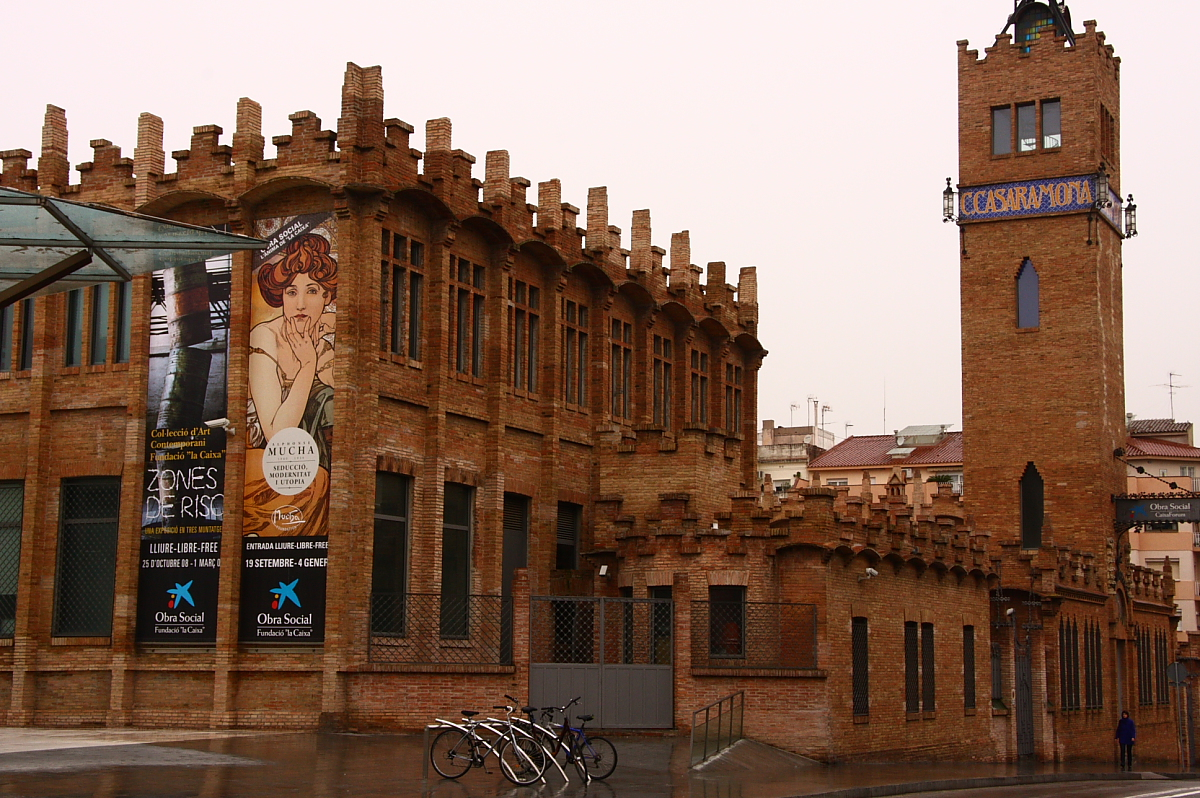
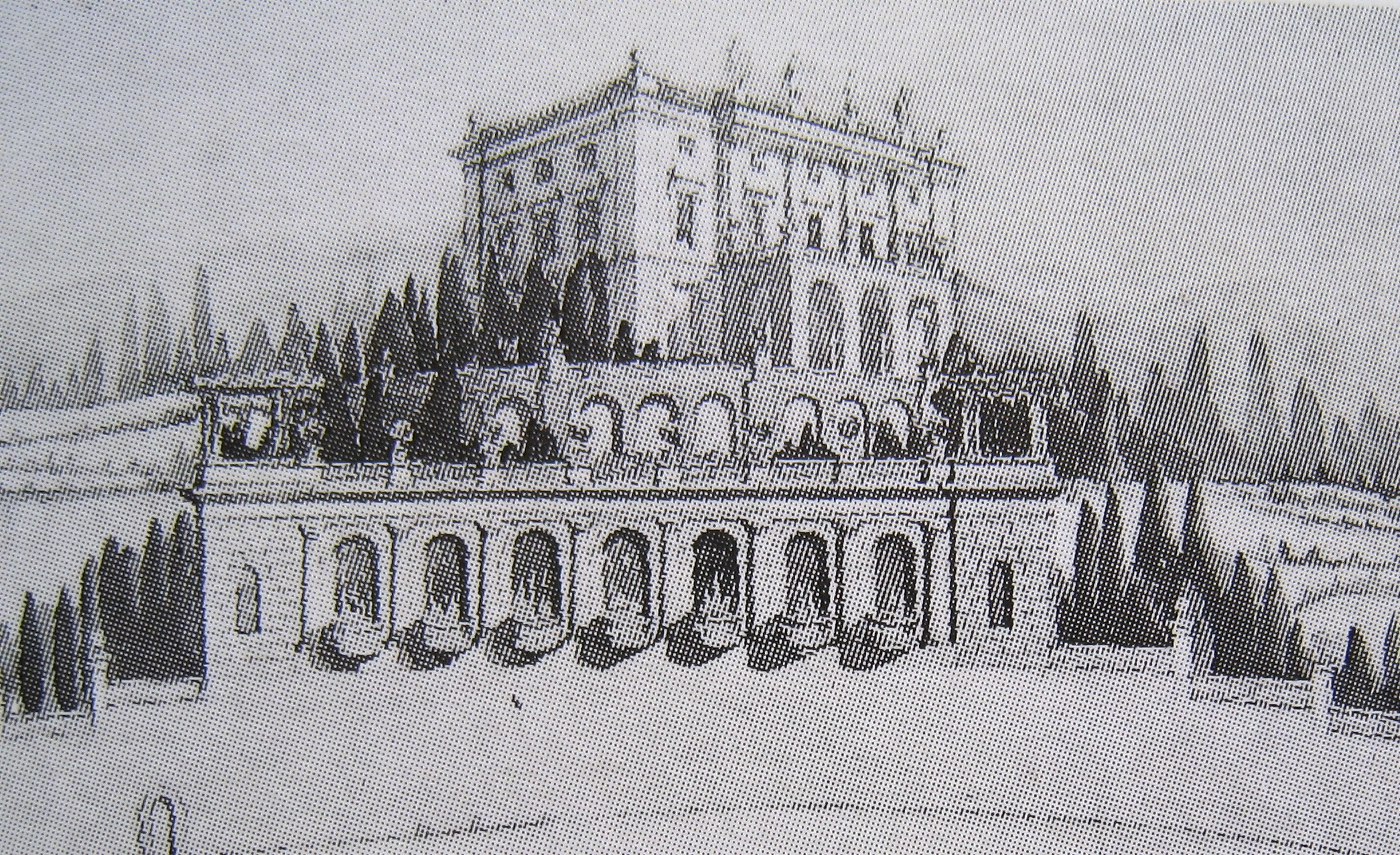
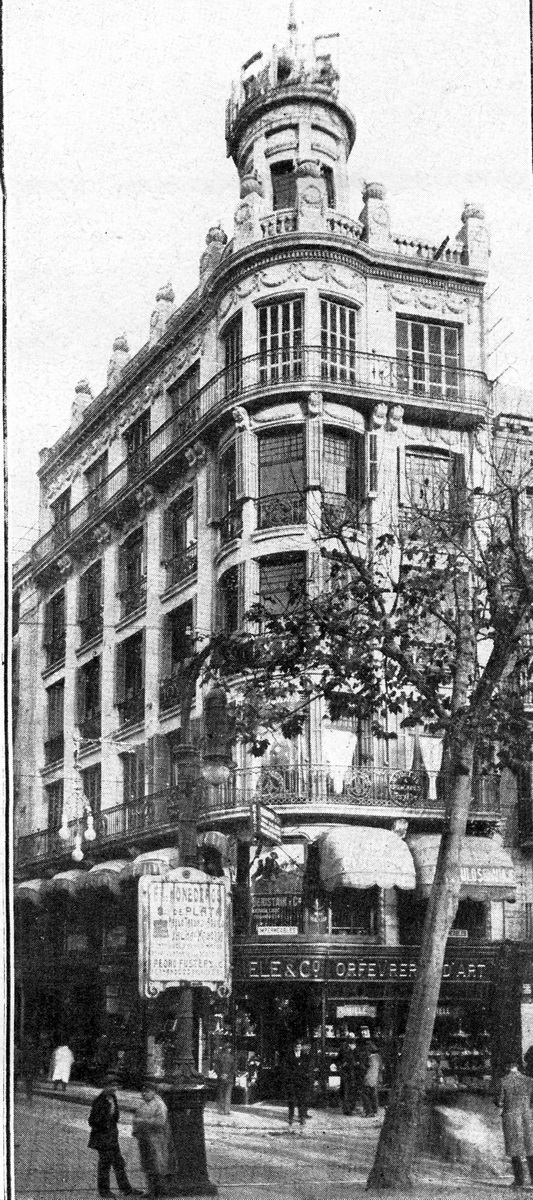
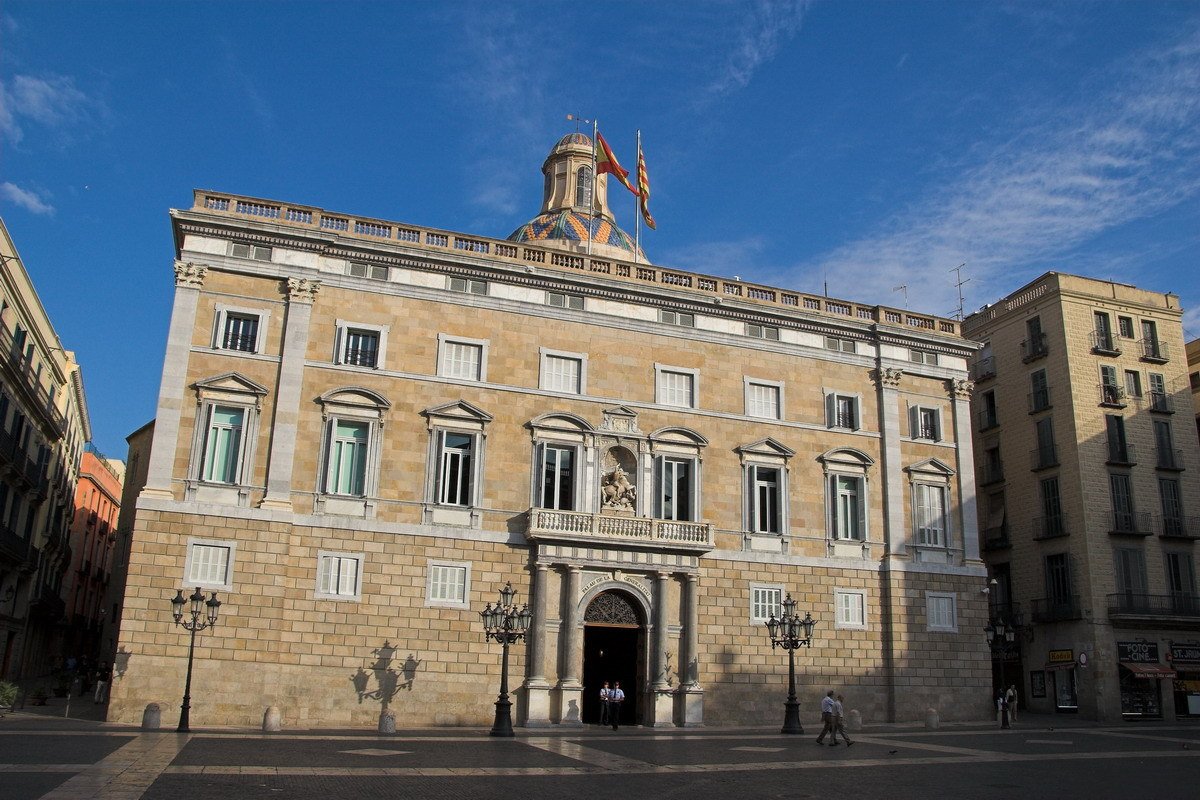
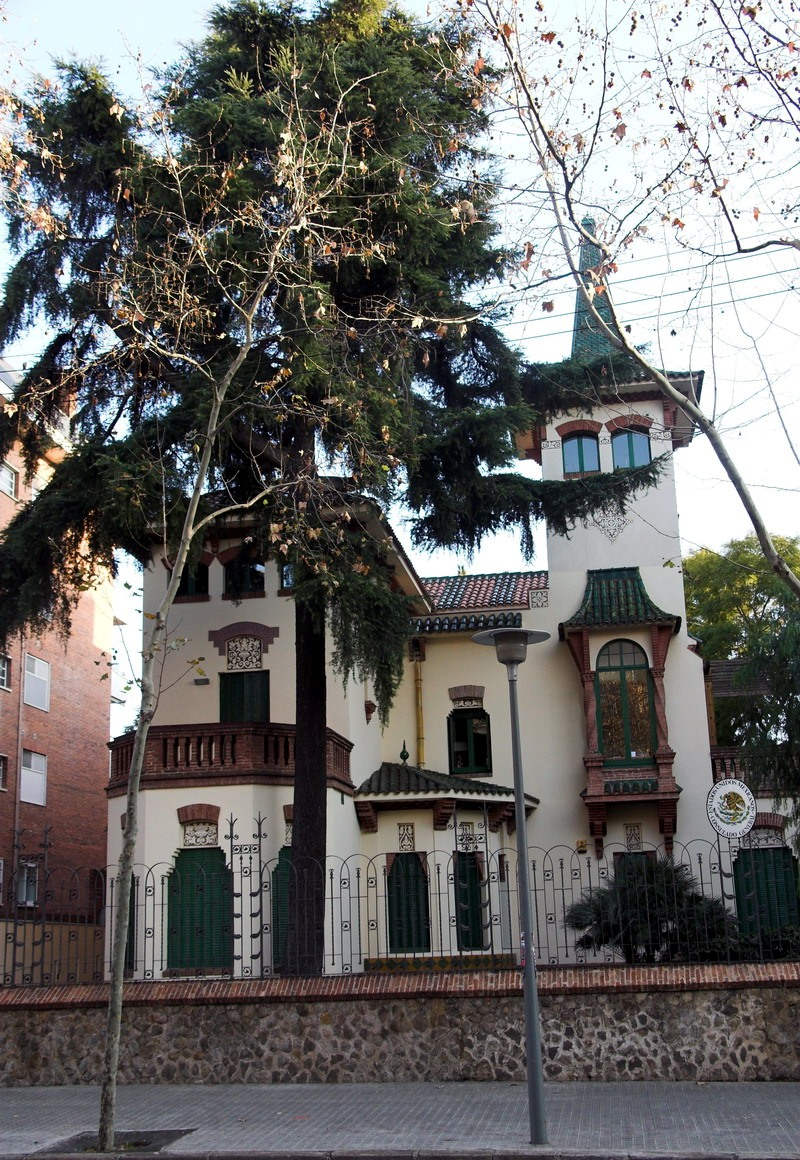
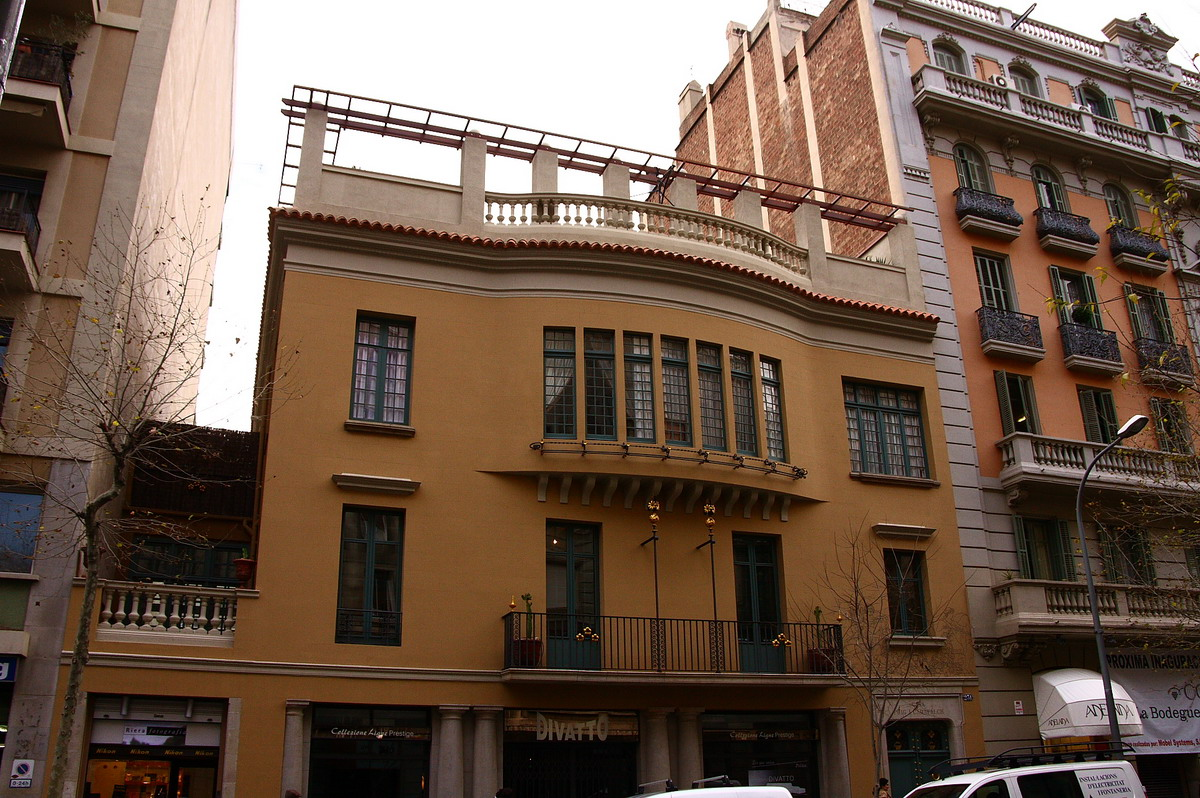
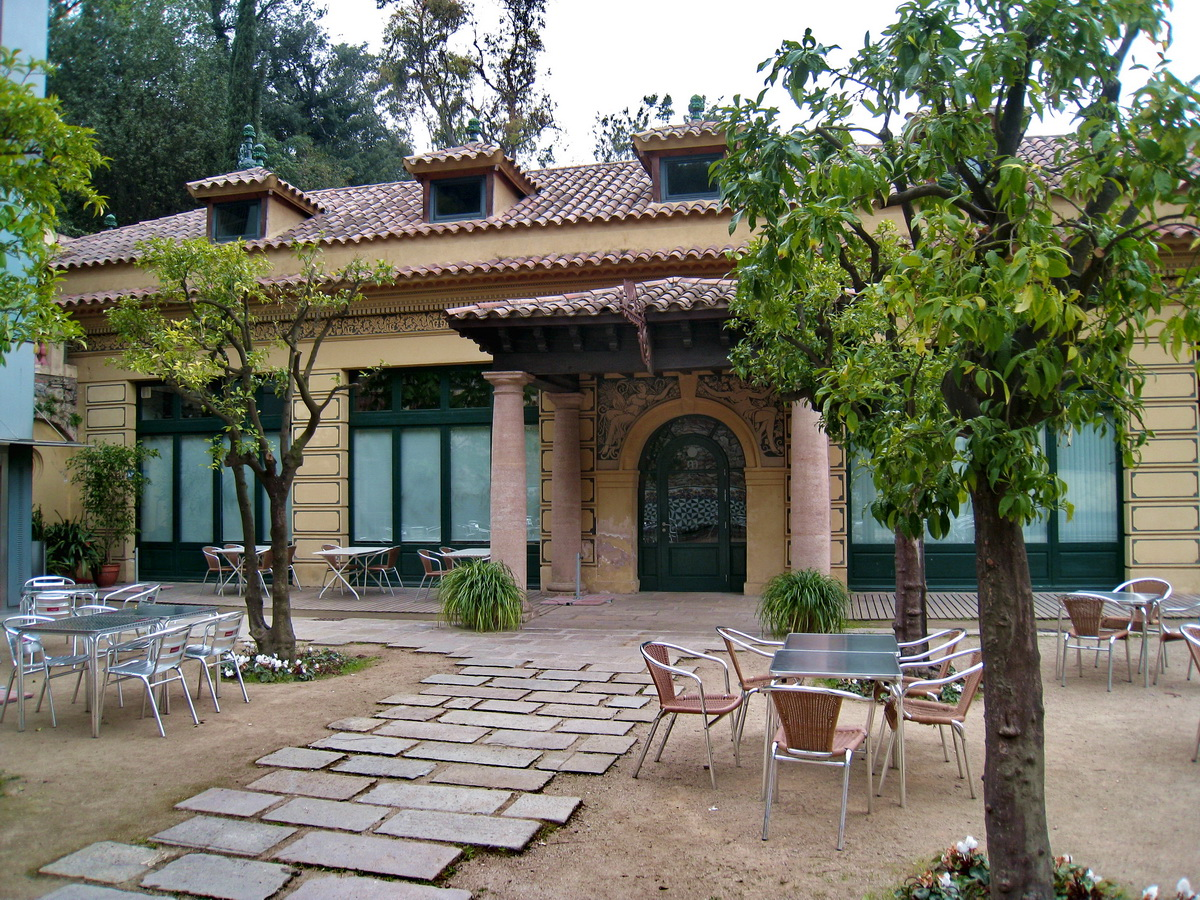
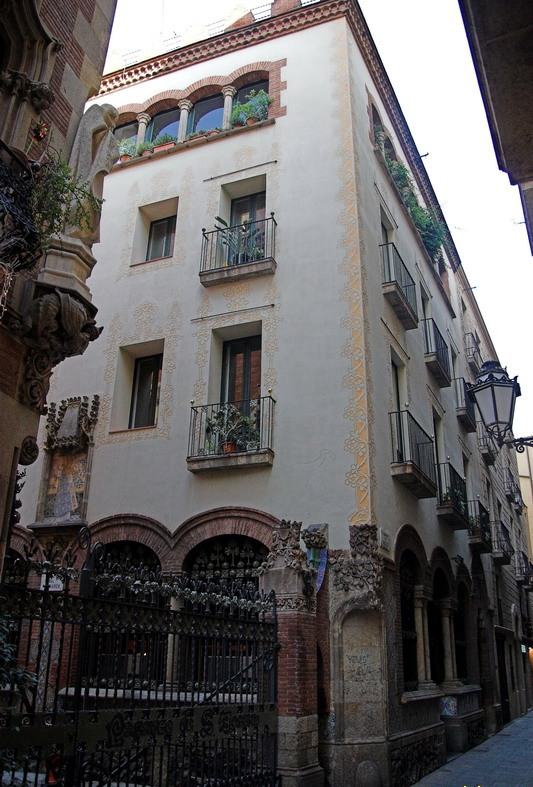
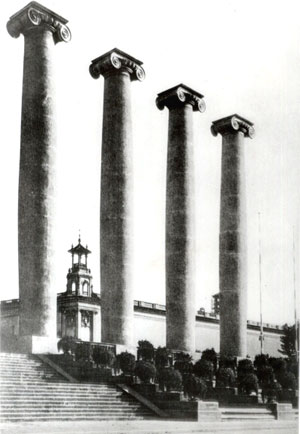
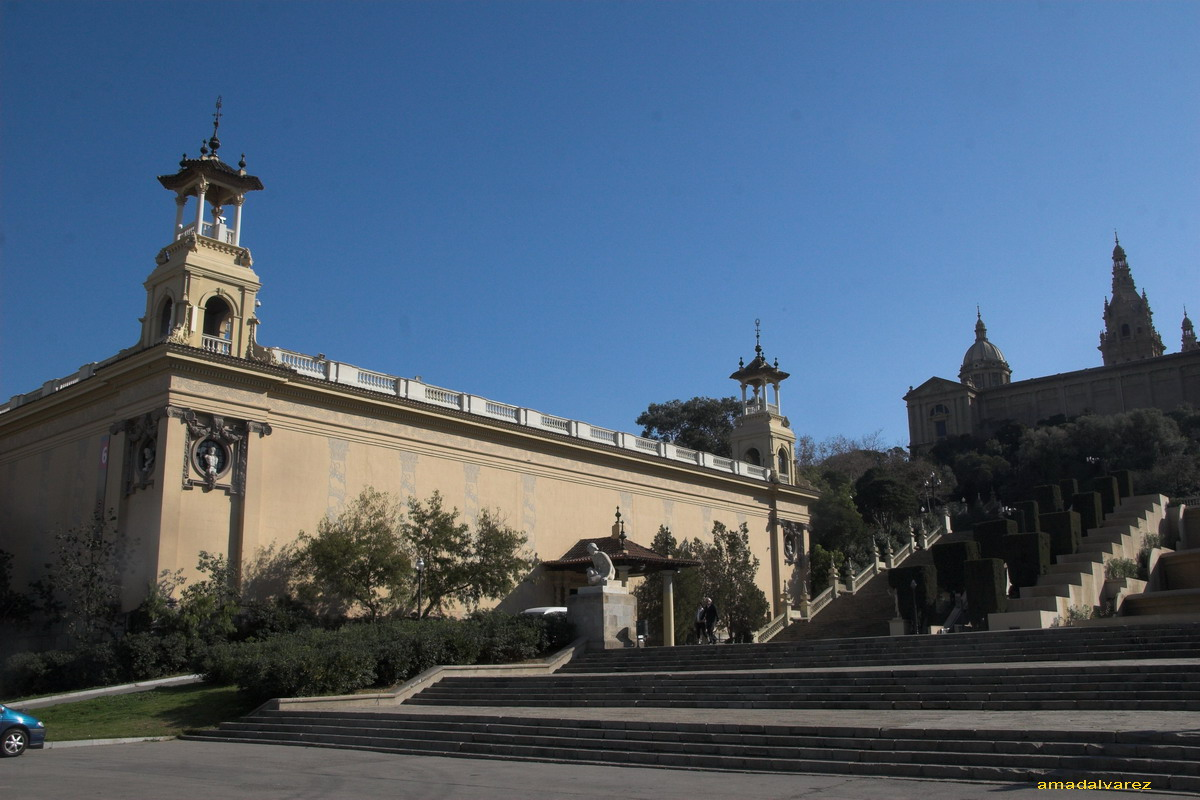
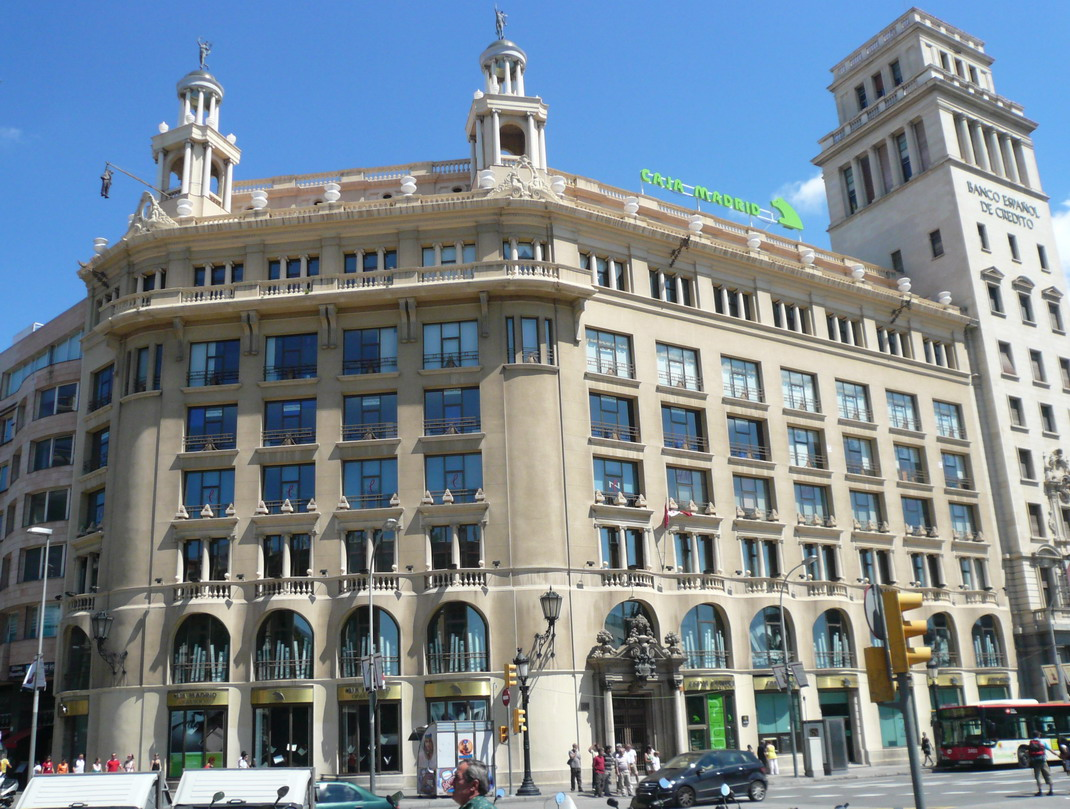
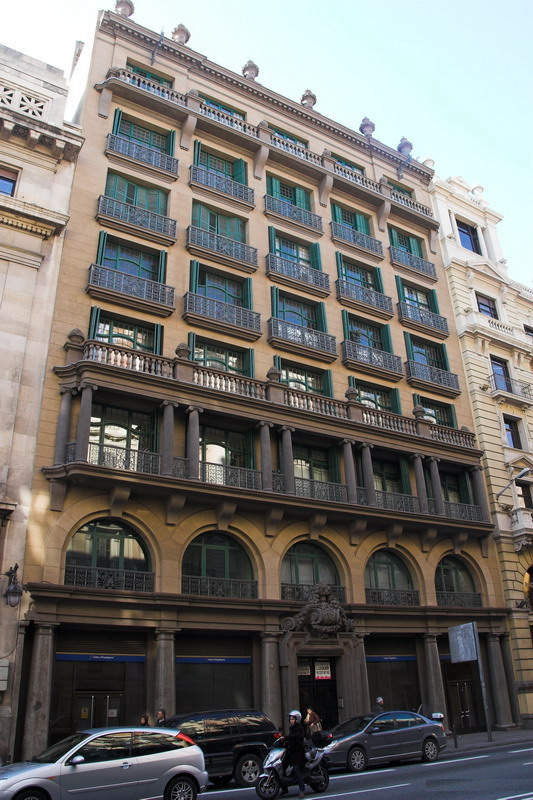
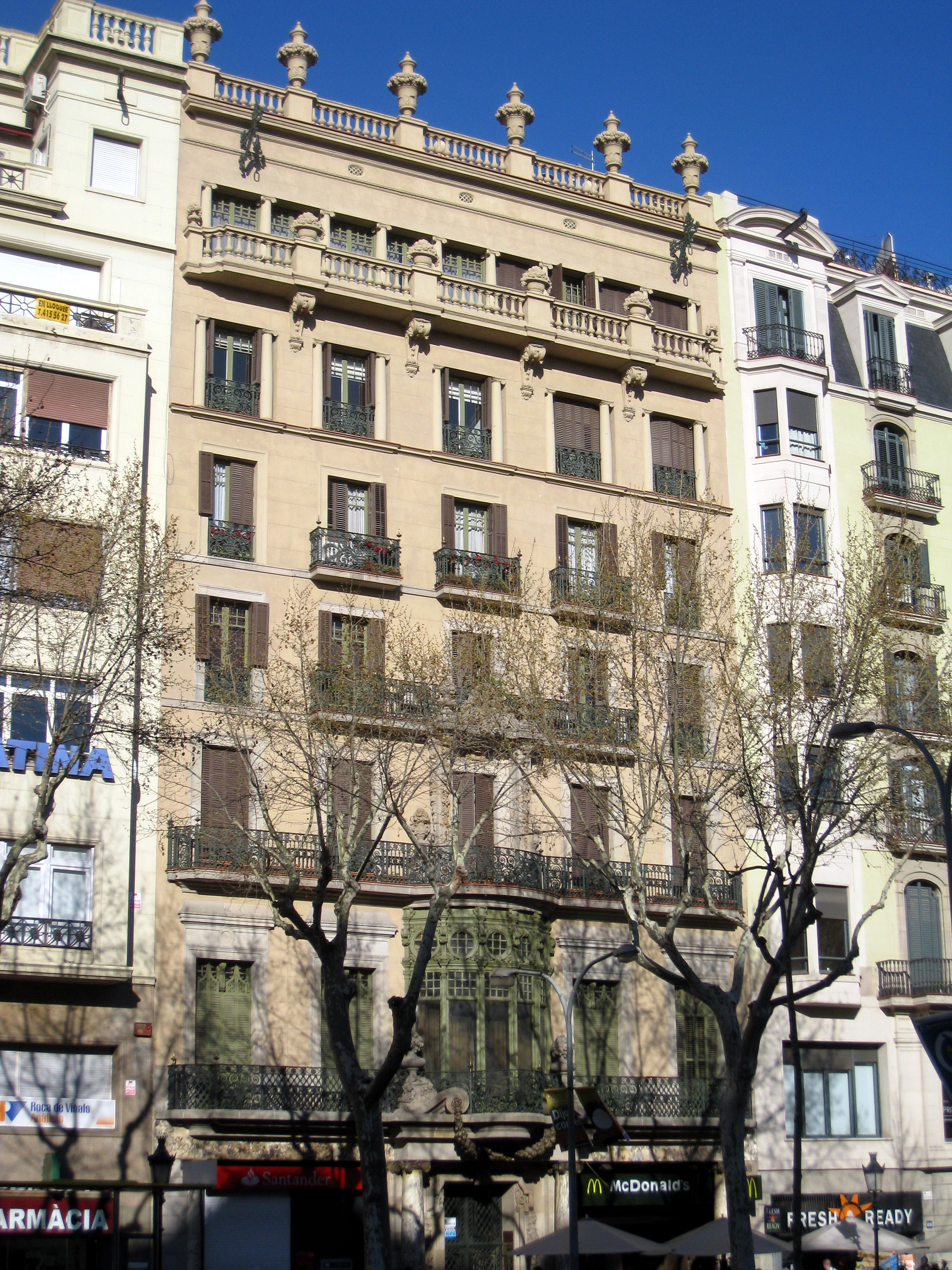
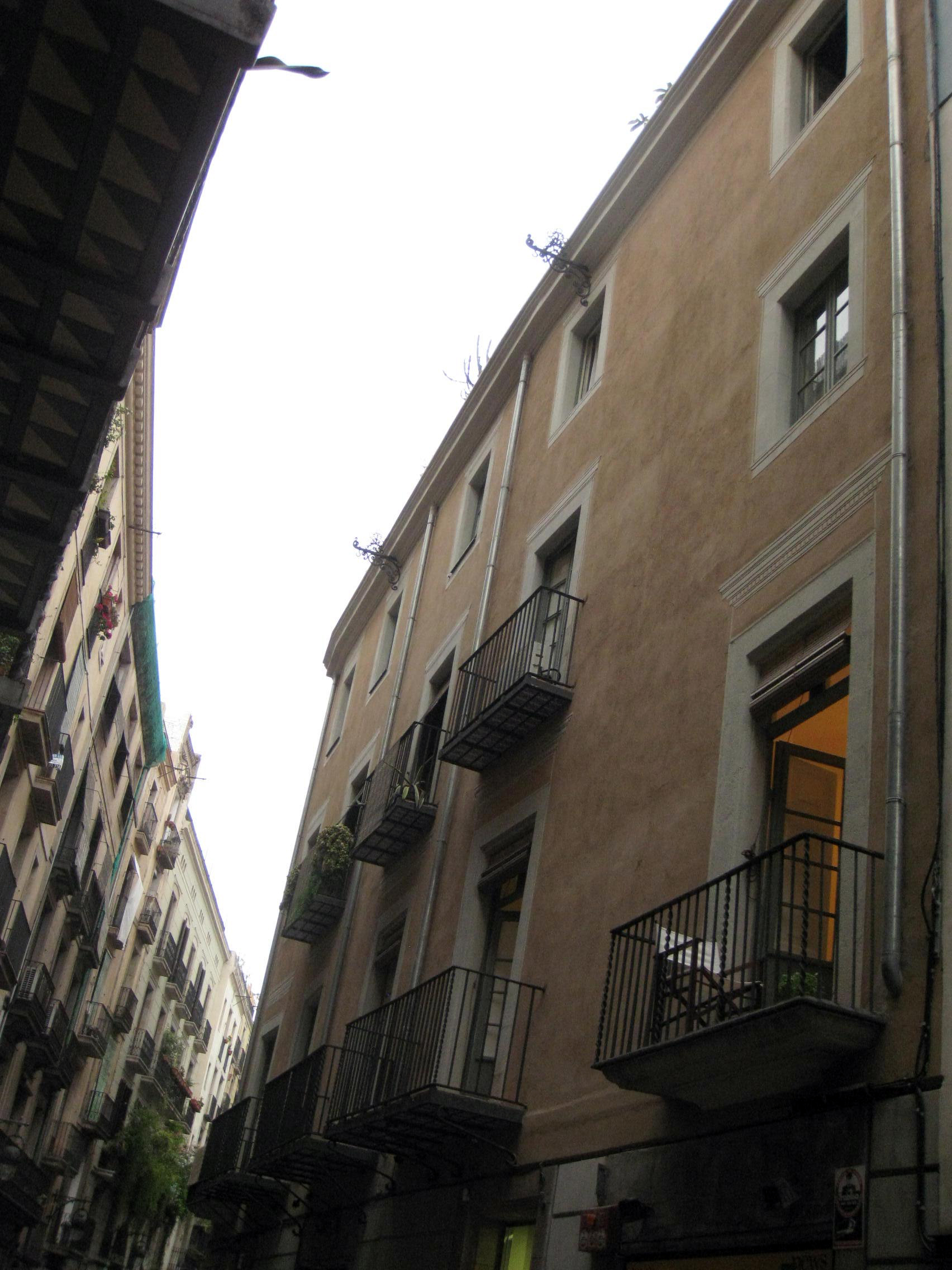
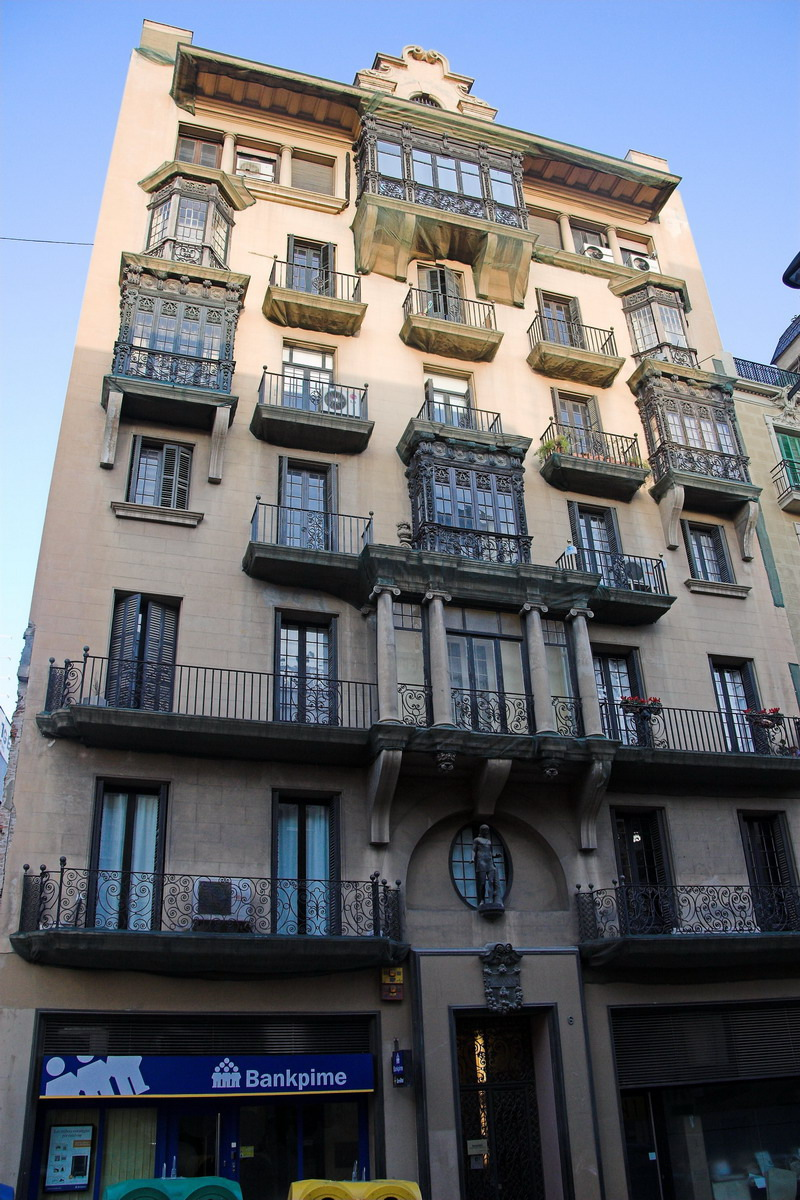
Year	Name	Location	Description	Condition	Image
1893	Joieria Macià	Carrer de Ferran, 18	Puig i Cadalfach made the decoration of jewelry. Had a neoclassical decoration with Neomedieval sculptural details and brackets are Neoclassical.	Disappeared
1896	Casa Martí	C. Montsió, 3 bis 41°33′12.65″N 2°24′2.36″E	The ground floor is the place Els Quatre Gats, meeting venue of the modernise artists.	Very good
1898	Casa	C. Boqueria, 12; 41°22′53.46″N 2°10′27.48″E	Commissioned by the owner of the Casa Martí changed many times and use long housed the inn "Branch of the universe". Have a sgraffito façade topped with battlements. The forging is of Manuel Ballarin and the cover is flanked by two statues of Arnau. Now houses a hotel.	Very good
1898–1900	Casa Amatller	Passeig de Gràcia, 41; 41°23′29.5″N 2°9′54″E	The chocolate industrial Antoni Amatller i Costa, became a building of 1875, he bought to move it, and commissioned works at Puig i Cadafalch, which opted to give the appearance urban gothic palace. Among the artists who were collaborating include Eusebi Arnau and Alfons Juyol responsibles of the sculpture, very important in the building.	Very good
1900	House-study of the photographers Napoleon	la Rambla, 18; 41°22′40.6″N 2°10′34.3″E	Terraced building, of ground floor, main and three floors above designed by Francesc Rogent i Pedrosa, which preserves the façade of the three upper floors. In 1900 the photographers Napoleon commission reforms to locate their study.	Totally transformed to locate Frontó Colom in 1941.
1901	Casa Macaya	Passeig de Sant Joan, 108; 41°23′59.37″N 2°10′09.96″E	Urban residence with white and graffiti façade with windows decorated with sculptures and capitals by Eusebi Arnau with themes very contemporary.	Very good
1901	Casa Muntadas	Av. Tibidabo, 48; 41°24′55.46″N 2°7′59.23″E	Recreate the façade of a typical Catalan masia, decorated with floral framing doors and windows.	Very good
1902	Cafè Torino	Passeig de Gràcia, 18	Owned by the Turinan Flaminio Mezzalama, who sought to promote the Martini & Rossi vermouth, was inaugurated on September 20 of 1902 and that same year won an award from the City Council of Barcelona. The artists had decorated fashion as Ricard de Capmany i Roura and Antoni Gaudí that made the Arab room. The furniture was Thonet, the decorative sculpture was by Massana i Buzzi, the fresco was by Saumell i Garcia and the locksmith by Ballarin. It closed around 1910–1911.	Disappeared
1902	Hotel Terminus	Carrer Aragó, 282	Hotel located in the train station of Aragó-Passeig de Gràcia. It was a building of the rose time, very floral on the outside with a wavy capcir own of the Baroque masias.	Disappeared in the 1960s.
1903	Casa Serra	Rambla de Catalunya, 126; 41°23′41.16″N 2°09′25.86″E	The façade was built in stone and beautifully decorated, matched to the Plateresque style, and is work by Eusebi Arnau.	Very good
1903	Casa Mercè Pastor de Cruïlles	Ctra. Vallvidrera a Tibidabo 102–104; 41°25′26.6″N 2°07′8.56″E	The Torre Pastor, single-family and study, commissioned by Mercedes Pastor, is composed in the manner of the Catalan manor houses of the 15th century, from a solid body, covered hipped, with eaves and a large angular tower. Highlights the placement of blocks in opus spicatum. He is currently a religious residence of Salesian community.	Regular
1904	Casa Eustaqui Polo	Passeig de Sant Gervasi, 55–57 (originally was num. 149)	t was commissioned by Eustaqui Polo i Ortigosa, father of the writer Xavier Polo i Ribas. It was a modernist building with extensive gardens that was sold in 1956 to then be demolished to build three blocks of flats.	Demolished in 1956
1904	Casa Trinxet	Carrer Còrsega, 268	It was commissioned by Avelino Trinxet Casas (in Catalan, Avel·lí Trinxet i Casas), a textile industrial uncle of the artist Joaquim Mir Trinxet who decorated the rooms with mural paintings. With a clear influence of Secession, was part of the white time of Puig i Cadalfach and was considered the work which began the transition to Noucentism. Despite heavy opposition to its demolition, the Barcelona council Porcioles allowed the disappearance of Casa Trinxet at the hands of real estate Nuñez i Navarro in March 1967.	Demolished in 1967
1904	Pantheon Terrades		No documentation.	?
1904–1906	Palau del Baró de Quadras	Av. Diagonal, 373; 41°23′47.92″N 2°9′41.09″E	The Baron of Quadras commissioned Puig i Cadafalch in 1900 to build their new house in Barcelona after finishing his palace in Massanes. The building is now the seat of Casa Asia.	Very good
1905	Casa Terrades; Casa de les Punxes	Av. Diagonal, 416–420; 41°23′52.5″N 2°9′49.26″E	Apartment building structured on three scales commissioned by Àngela Brutau, widow of Terrades -client's farm Seva and pantheon of Terrades-, to reach her three daughters and that allows them to live of rent. It is a building of "medieval" look which, it says, Puig i Cadalfach could have been inspired by the building that appears at the bottom of the painted gothic table called Virgin of the Consellers.	Very good
1905	Farmàcia Sastre i Marquès	C. Hospital, 109	The property was demolished to open the Rambla del Raval. Some decorative elements such as a lamp, mosaics and some stained glass were recovered before its demolition.	Demolished
1905	Casa Sastre i Marqués	C. Cardenal Vives i Tutó, 29–35; 41°23′40.39″N 2°7′16.9″E	Private house framed in white period. The architect combined brick with sgraffito and tile glaze. A roundabout at the corner of the garden.	Recently restored.
1905	Building commissioned by Sastre i Marqués for his family	Calle Princesa 20		Good
1909	Casa Llorach	C. Muntaner, 265	Commissioned by Concepció Dolsa, widow of Llorach. It had a large garden overlooking the street of Muntaner with a fence building of smooth undulations. The building, of Alpine inspiration, had some amazing graffiti on the main façade.	Disappeared
1910	Casa Àngels Macià i Monserdà	C. Anglí		?
1911	Casa Pere Company	C. Buenos Aires, 56–58; 41°23′35.29″N 2°8′54.0″E	Corresponds to the white time and has a Nordic touch. Now host the Museum of Sports of Catalonia.	Very good
1911	Fàbrica Casaramona	Avinguda de Francesc Ferrer i Guàrdia, 6–8; 41°22′16.79″N 2°8′59.1″E	The Casaramona Factory is a project by architect Puig i Cadafalch commissioned by Casimir Casaramona i Puigcercós, owner of textile business, to build a new factory at the foot of Montjuïc, to replace one earlier destroyed by a fire. Currently houses the CaixaForum.	Very good
1913	Casa Joaquim Carreras "Santa Margarita"	C. Sant Pere Claver	Neoclassical building, very geometric, with large gardens and walkways with pergolas to save the unevenness of the terrain through stairways and balconies with balusteres.	Disappeared
1914	Casa Miele	C. Ferran 2 and la Rambla; 41°22′49.2″N 2°10′27.36″E	The Casa Miele, that sold domestic objects made of metal called precisely "Miele silver", a German invention of great international success and not just imitate the qualities of real silver but improved. Due to installing this luxurious and popular store, the architect Puig i Cadafalch did a total reform of the house which won an honorable mention in the Annual competition of artistic buildings. Currently the building has been transformed, but it shows his hand on some items that have survived: fragments of the railings on the ground floor, decoration of the balconies and rearrangement of the windows.	Transformed
1914	Palau de la Generalitat de Catalunya	Pl. Sant Jaume, 4; 41°22′58″N 2°10′36″E	The establishment of the Commonwealth of Catalonia resulted in the recovery of the Palau de la Generalitat as a symbol of Catalanism. Enric Prat de la Riba commissioned to Puig i Cadafalch the rehabilitation and removal of Spanish or monarchic signs. The work allowed to place the National Library of Catalonia within the palace.	Good
1914	Casa Muley Afid	Pg. Bonanova, 55; 41°24′12.67″N 2°7′44.5″E	Built by order of Muley Afid, Sultan Moroccan exile in Barcelona, is a building with a certain eastern touch. It currently houses the Consulate of Mexico.	Very good
1917	Casa Puig i Cadafalch	C. de Provença, 231; 41°23′35.55″N 2°9′33.5″E	It was his private house and where he died in 1956. It is a sober building, of his yellow time, in which Puig i Cadalfach gives for completion the Gothic palace and center-European villa, seeking a more urban and repeatable housing of households.	Very good
1918	Restaurant of the Font del Gat	Parc de Montjuïc; 41°22′4.17″N 2°9′27.6″E	He rebuilt the development work in the area of the font del Gat (fountain of the cat) designed by Jean-Claude Nicolas Forestier in the development plan of the Montjuic mountain and joined the restaurant. For years has not the role of restaurant, and currently hosts the headquarters of the Royal Spanish Federation of Tennis.	Good
1920	Casa Carreras	C. Montsió, 5; 41°23′08.80″N 2°10′25.6″E	It can not be stressed that this is only the reform of an existing building. The façade of the passage there are two panels of painted tiles. One with St. Joachim on the portal of No. 4 and, on the edge of Montsió, another with St. Eloi of excellent modernisme drawing under stone niche very ornate.	Very good
1919	The Four Columns	Pl. Cascades, s/n	The Ionic four columns were a monument to the Catalanism, that represented the four vertical red bars of the Catalan flag and was also tied to the idea of progress represented by the 1929 Barcelona International Exposition. They were demolished by the dictatorship of Primo de Rivera which sought to remove any symbol of Catalan identity in the eyes of the world. However, thanks to the popular initiative in December 2010 were returned to raise a one less meter of tall at the same place where they were stationed in the beginning. Currently these are a symbol of perseverance, conviction and strength of language, culture and Catalan national identity.	Very good. Demolished in 1928. Lifted in December 2010
1920	Palaus d'Alfons XIII i de Victòria Eugènia; Fira de Barcelona	Pl. Cascades, s/n 41°22′13.70″N 2°9′7.8″E	These are the only two palaces by Puig i Cadalfach of the built complex for the 1929 Barcelona International Exposition. Between them, to the front of the avenue and shaping the square, were the Four Columns.	Good
1921	Casa Pich i Pon	Plaça de Catalunya, 9; 41°23′15.19″N 2°10′07.16″E	It is a reform of an original building of Josep Vilaseca i Casanovas dedicated to offices, except the top floor which was home of the owner.	Good
1922	Casa Luis Guarro	Via Laietana, 37; 41°23′9.23″N 2°10′33.84″E	Office building and terraced homes of Noucentisme style that, besides the traditional elements of the neoclassical style, also has some neo-Baroque elements such as the thick columns or garlands of flowers and fruits of the frontispiece. Is part of the yellow time. It was commissioned by the paper industrialist Lluís Guarro.	Regular
1924	Casa Casaramona	Passeig de Gracia, 48–52; 41°23′30.82″N 2°9′56.64″E	House built by order of August Casaramona, son of Casimir Casaramona. It is a restoration of an existing building that already incorporates a little of modernisme style, similar to the Casa Guarro in Via Laietana and clearly located to his yellow period.	Good
1924	Casa-fàbrica Casas	Carrer Sant Pere Més Alt, 46	He renovated an existing 17th-century building. Reform the ground and three floors as well as the penthouse.	Very good
1928	Casa Rosa Alemany	Av. República Argentina, 6; 41°24′26.38″N 2°8′54.84″E	Also attributed to Lluís Planas, is an apartment building, of ground and six floors of Noucentisme style. The composition of the façade plays around the location of windows and balconies that are different in each floor. On the door is a statue of Diana. It was considered a sign of the highest modernity of the time and had the main floor located on the top floor, unlike the location in the main. It was commissioned by the political Joan Pich i Pon.	Good

=== Canet de Mar ===
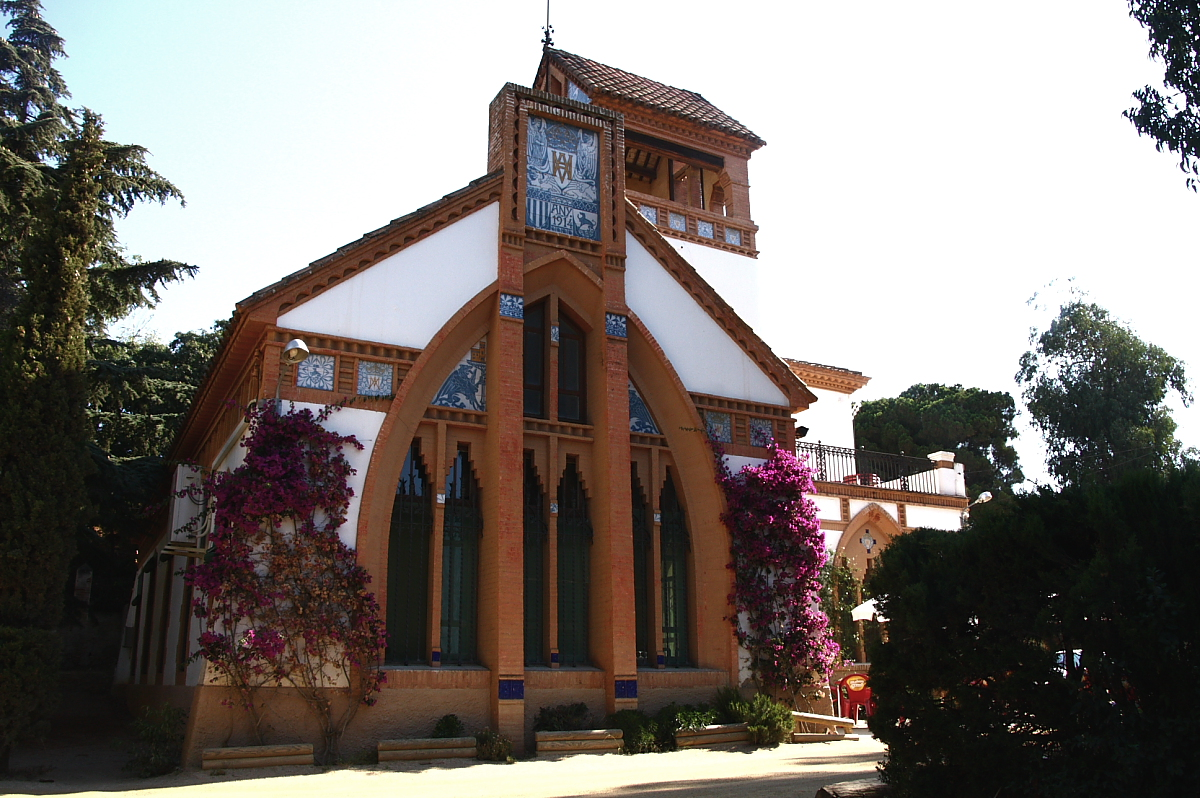
Year	Name	Location	Description	Condition	Image
1898	Restaurant of the Hermitage of la Misericòrdia	Parc de la Misericòrdia; 41°35′49.6″N 2°34′55.15″E	Storey building with typical structure of Puig i Cadafalch with neo-Gothic windows similar to Els Quatre Gats and a lookout tower typical in the modernisme towers. The decor of shades in blue tiles.	Good
1899	Fàbrica Carbonell Susagna	Riera Lledoners, 111; 41°35′33.56″N 2°34′57″E	The knitting factory was originally in 1899. Joan Carbonell Reverter, son of Joan Carbonell continued the business and changed the name to Carbonell Reverter. It was designed in 1897–98 and began production called Carbonell Susagna and was promoted by industrials Frederic Susagna and Joan Carbonell Paloma. The master builders were Martí Isern and Joan Solà. Remains just the form of entry, of brick.	Degraded

=== Esplugues de Llobregat ===
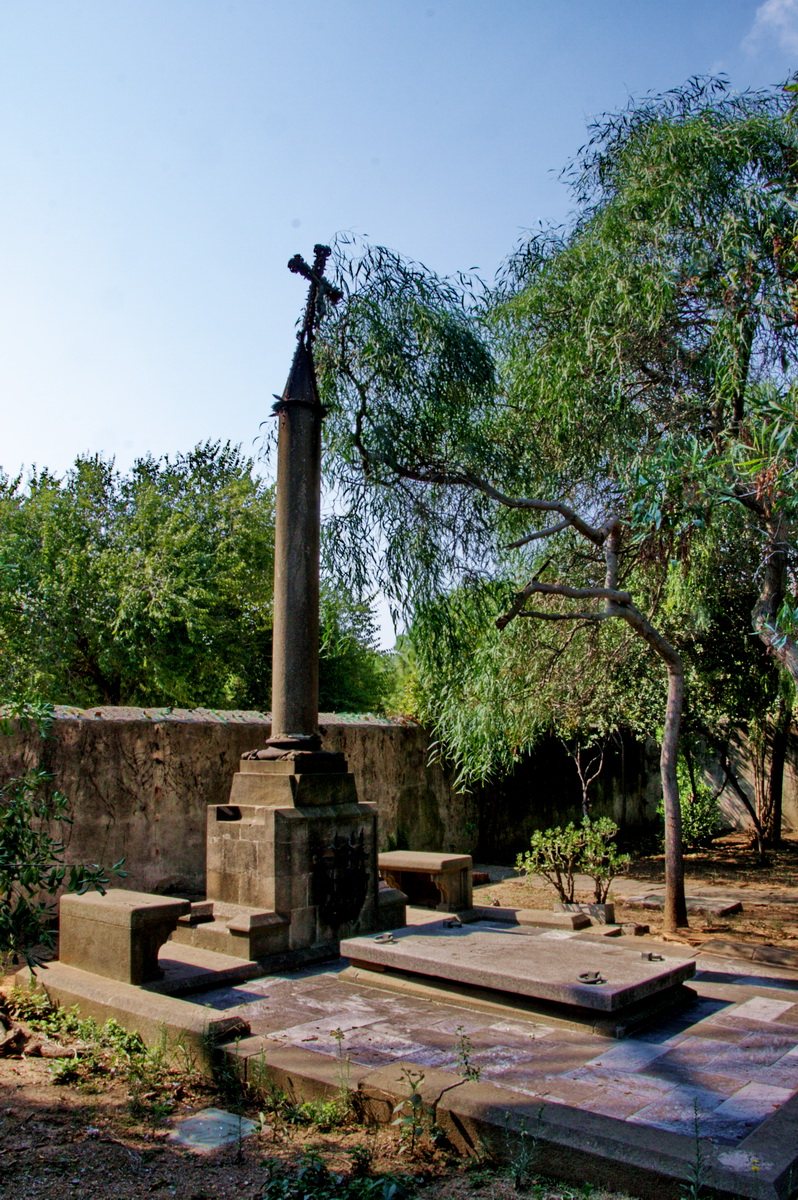
Year	Name	Location	Description	Condition	Image
1904	Pantheon Garí	Parish Cemetery; 41°22′45.26″N 2°05′01.24″E	Cadafalch build it for the family Garí (those of Casa Garí of Argentona) in the area of pantheons of the parish cemetery of Esplugues de Llobregat. It consists of a pedestal with a cylindrical column which there is a wrought iron cross with Christ at the foot of the column that has representations of animals such as snake or toad.	Regular

=== La Garriga ===
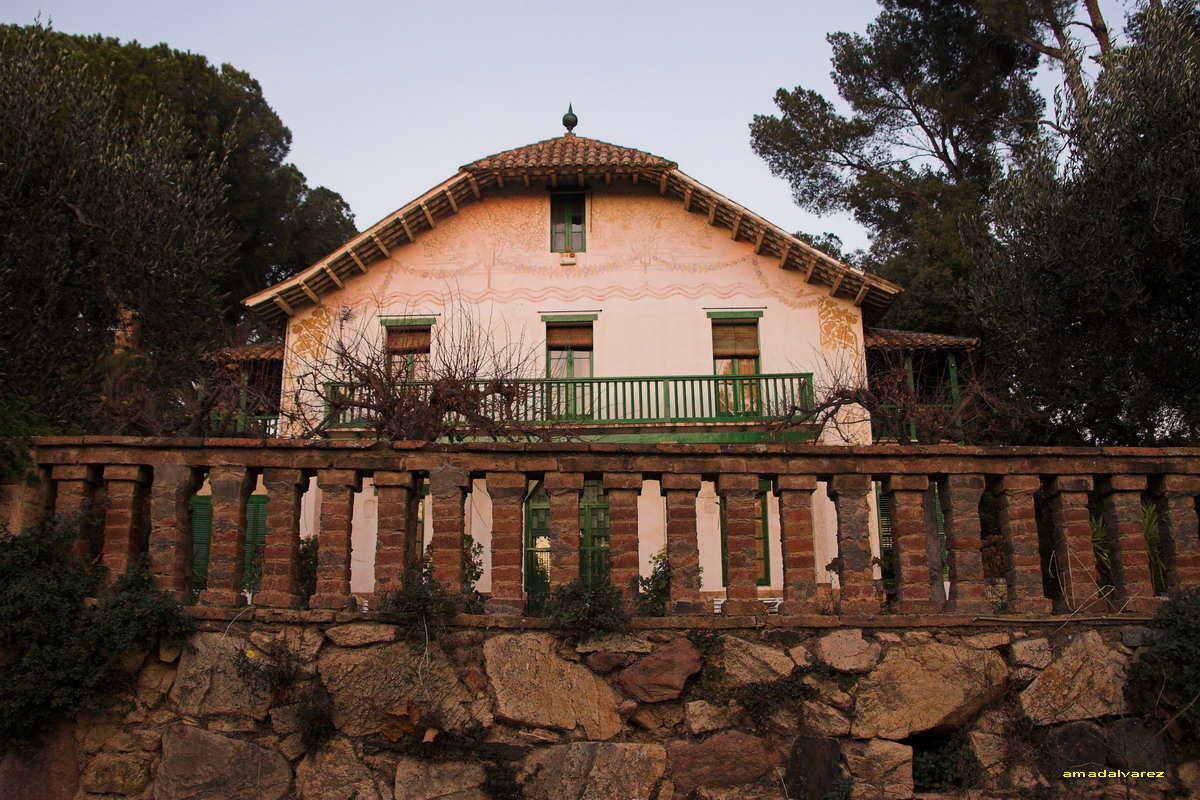
Year	Name	Location	Description	Condition	Image
1902	Casa Furriols	C. Carrerada, 1; 41°40′52.9″N 2°17′22.96″E	House of two floors and lofts with two covered waters. In very simple structure, highlights the delicate sgraffitos of the main façade. The fence on the street is decorated with the same tiles that would use in the Casa Carreras.	Good

=== Lloret de Mar ===
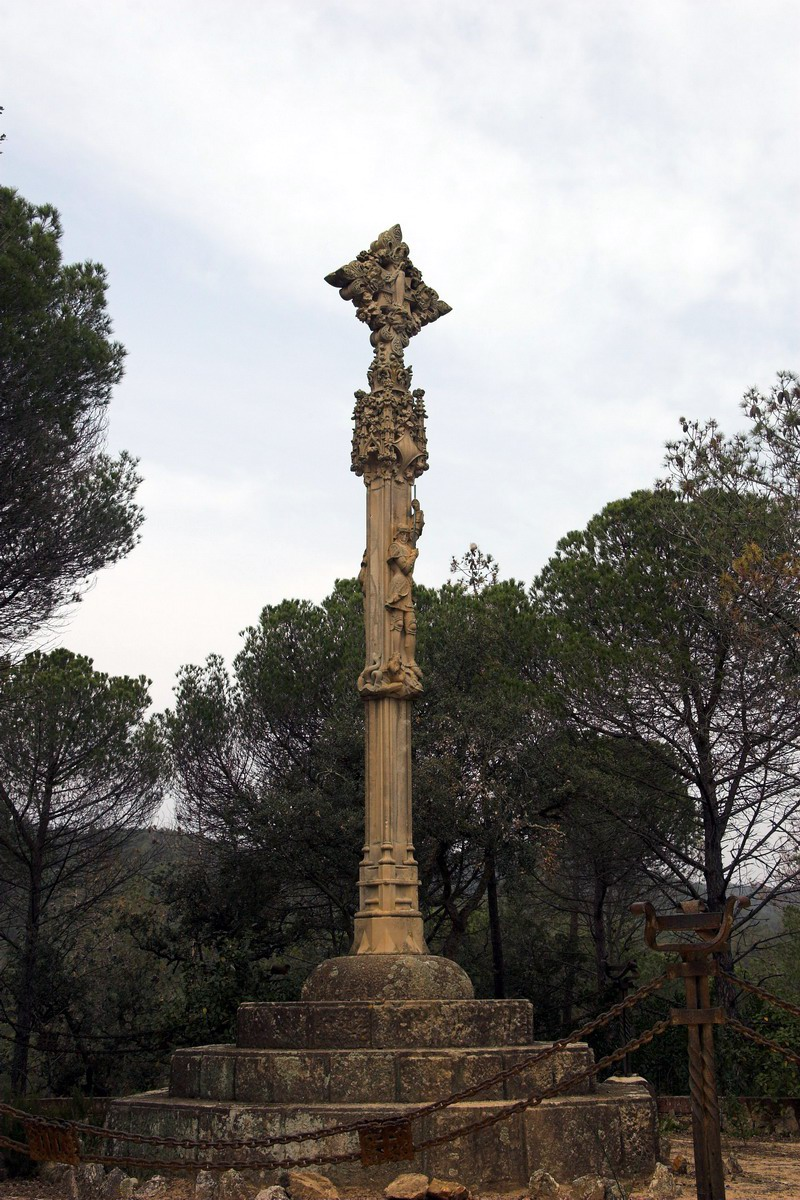
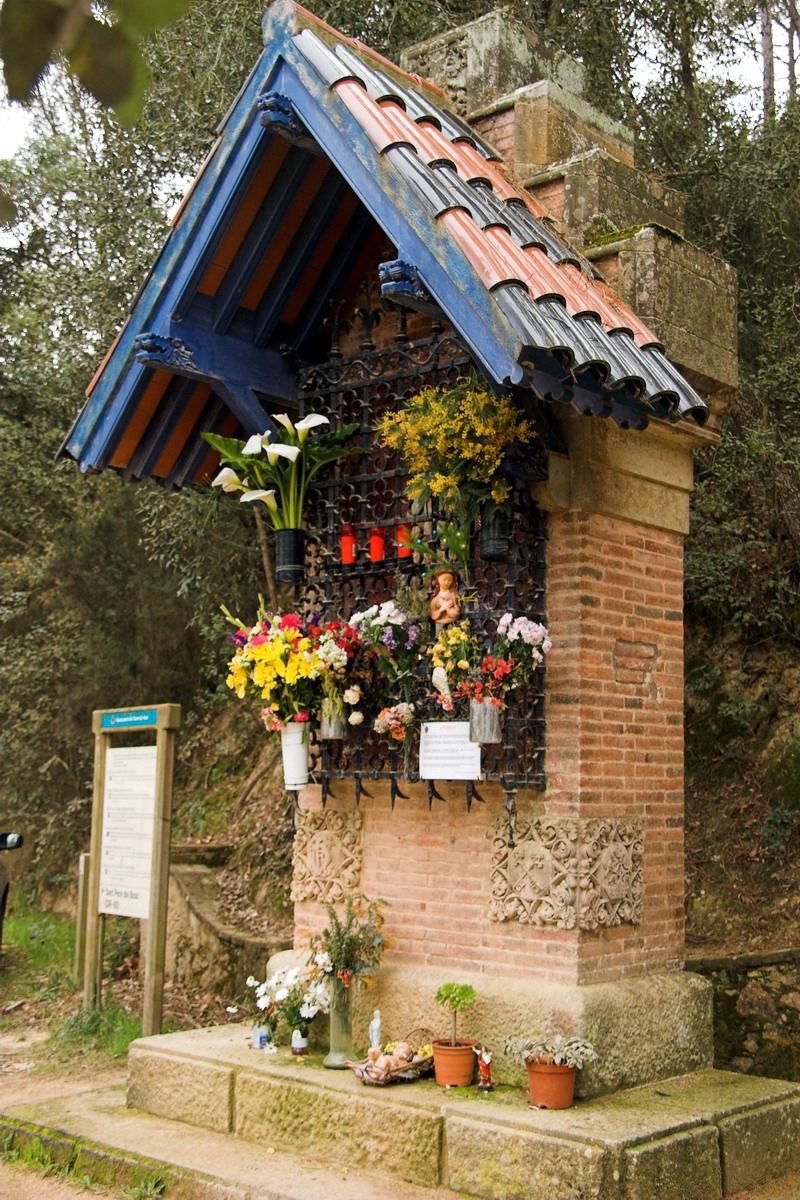
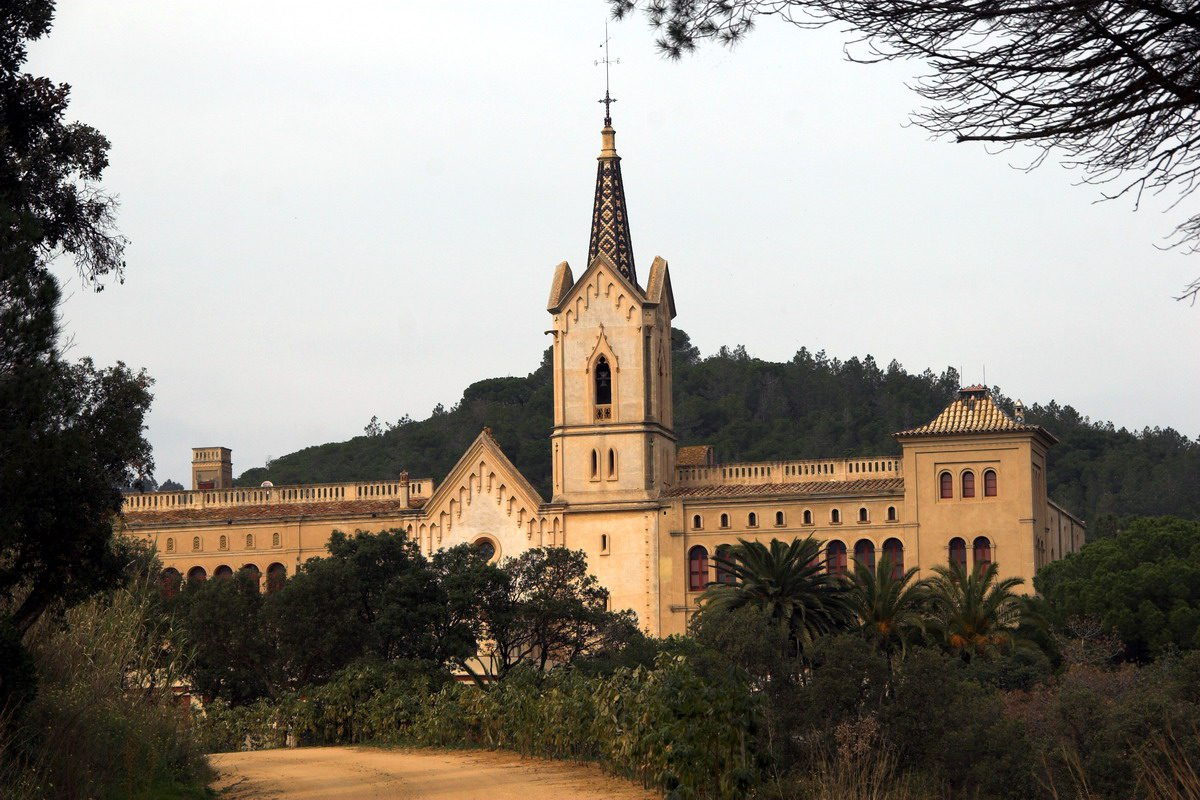
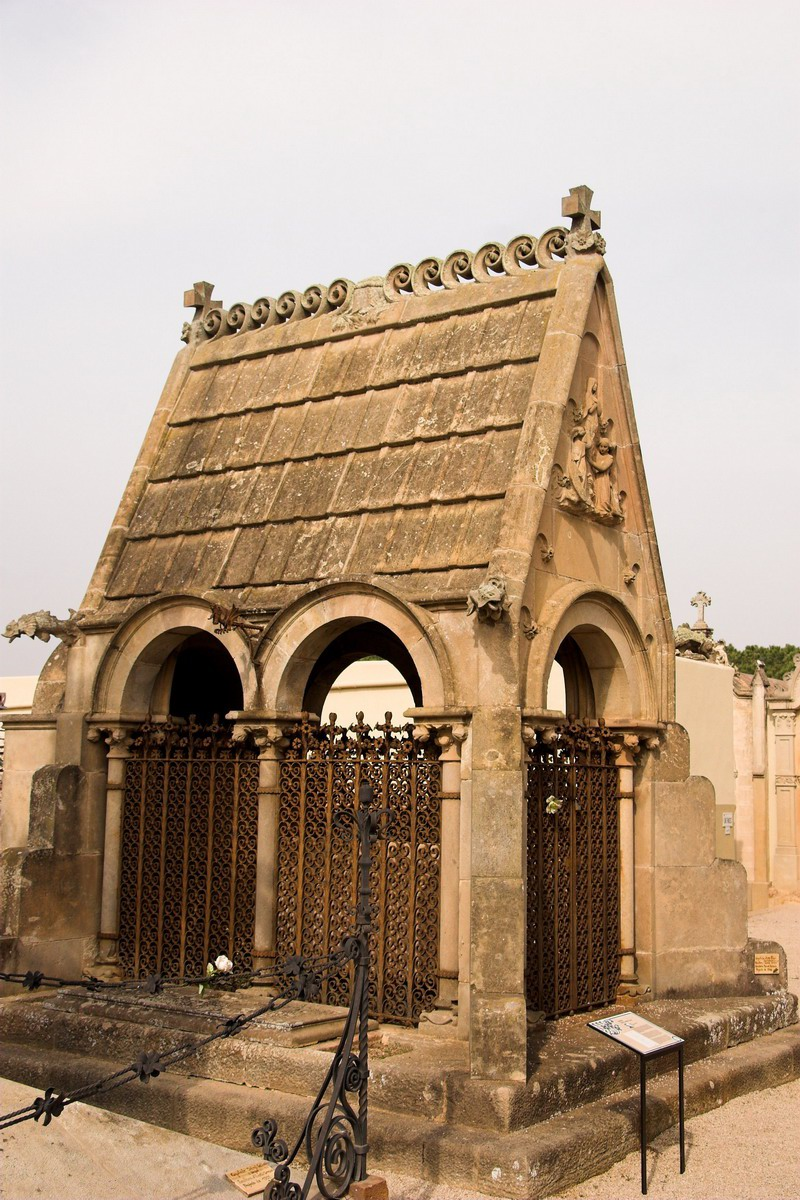
Year	Name	Location	Description	Condition	Image
1898	Creu de Terme, oratori i reformes	Sant Pere del Bosc; 41°42′42.55″N 2°47′26.69″E	The colonial Nicolau Font i Maig, count of Jaruco, commissioned to Puig i Cadalfach the direction of the reform of the shrine of Sant Pere del Bosc, who participated Enric Monserdà i Vidal with paintings of the church, and Eusebi Arnau with the sculptures. Puig i Cadalfach designed the access roads, an oratory in the Mare de Deu de Gràcia and a creu de terme, with a Saint George work by Arnau, opened the May 1 of 1898 and that Monsignor Jacint Verdaguer devotes some verses to his song "La Creu".	Good
1902	Pantheon Costa i Macià	Cemetery of Lloret de Mar; 41°42′06.80″N 2°50′09.9″E	Pantheon covered to two sides, open on three sides with holes with arch and pillars finished with capitals, closed with a very elaborate wrought iron work of Eduard Ballarin. The sculptures are of Eusebi Arnau and mosaics of Lluís Brú i Salelles.	Good

=== Massanes ===
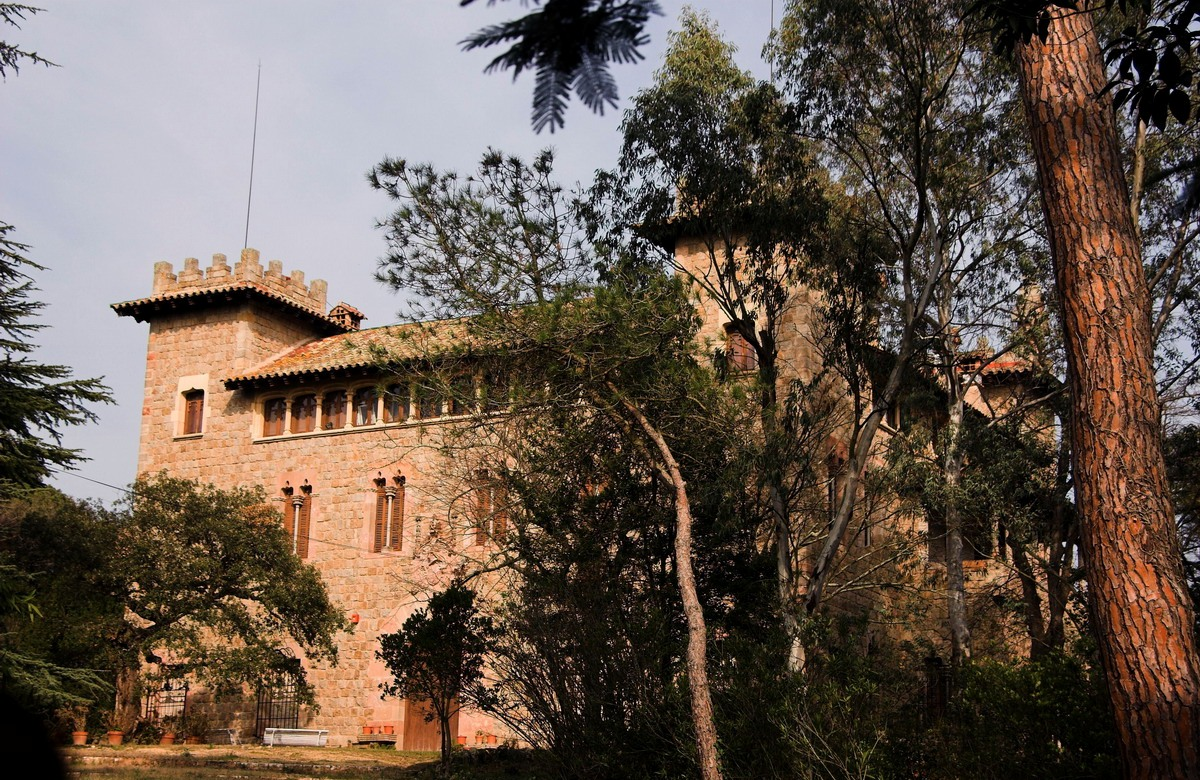
Year	Name	Location	Description	Condition	Image
1900	Palau del Baró de Quadras	Mas Quadres; 41°45′22.46″N 2°39′32.19″E	Big house, built in neo-Gothic style built for the industrialist Manuel Quadres i Feliu, first Baron of Quadras. Square design with three floors and two towers with battlements on each side. It has a large doorway with the coat of the family.	Good

=== Mataró ===
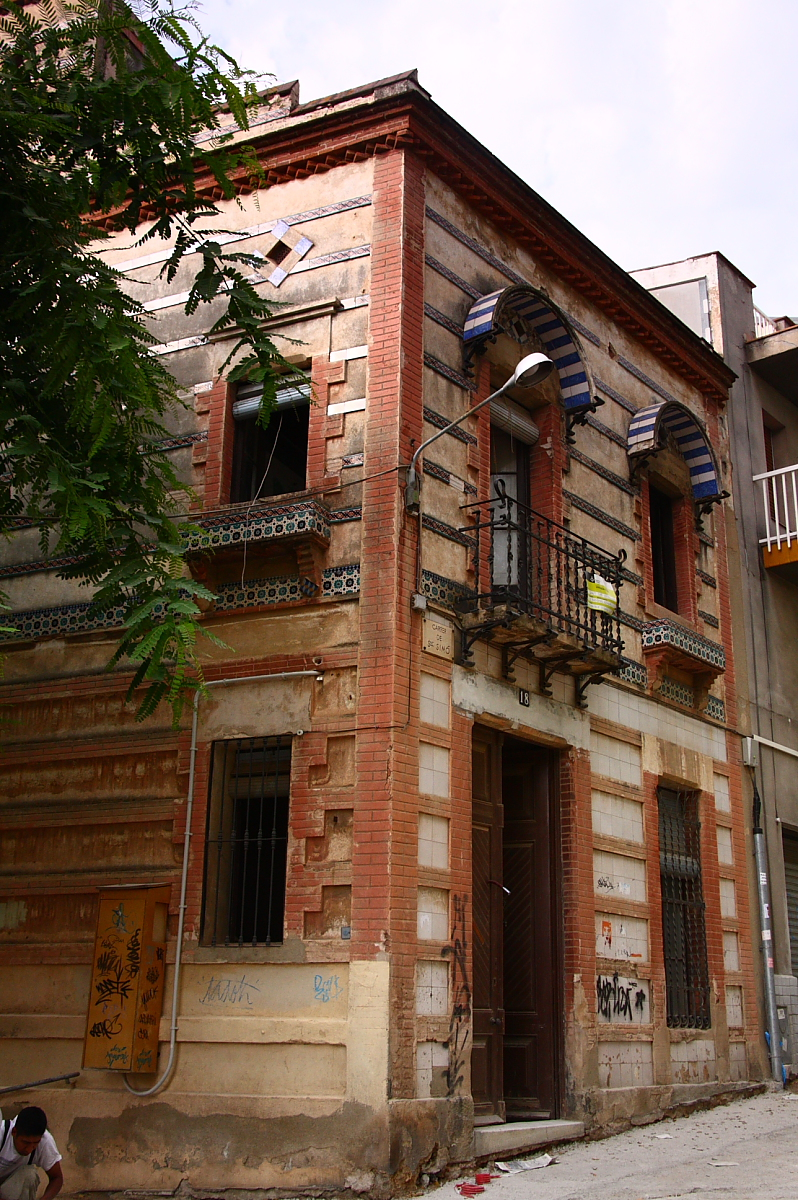
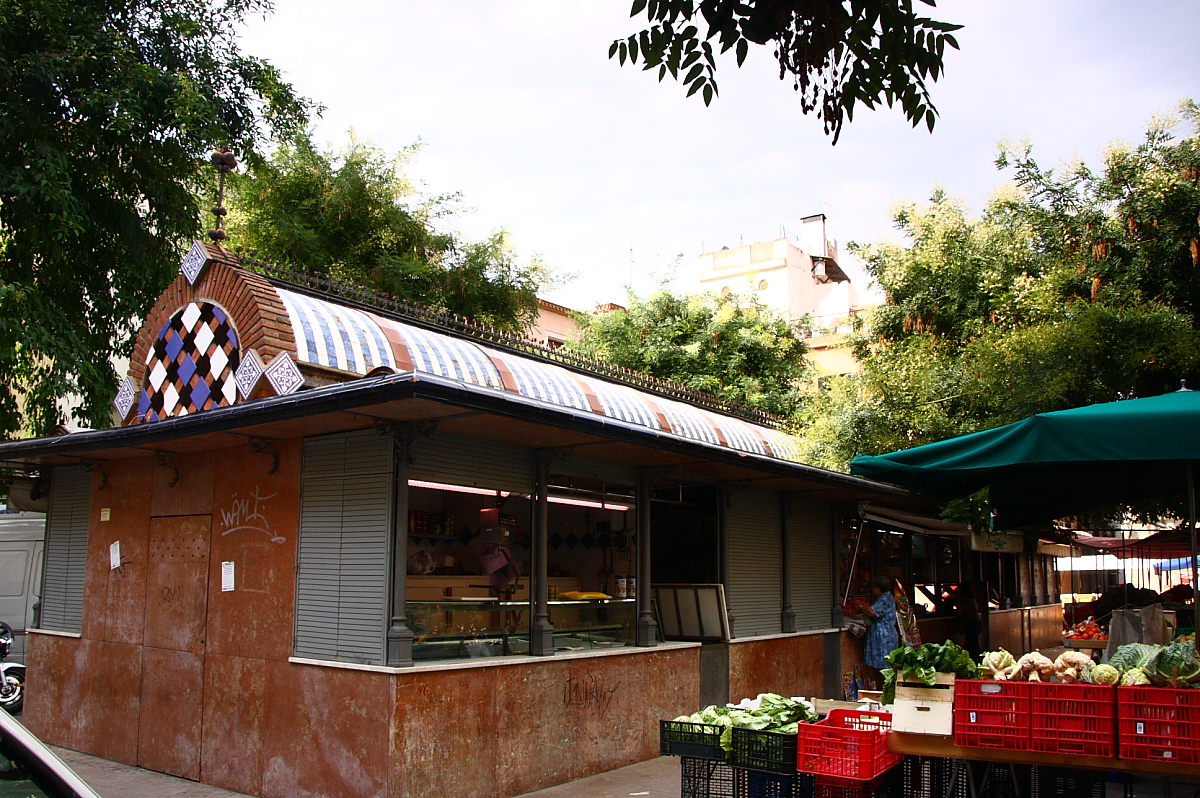
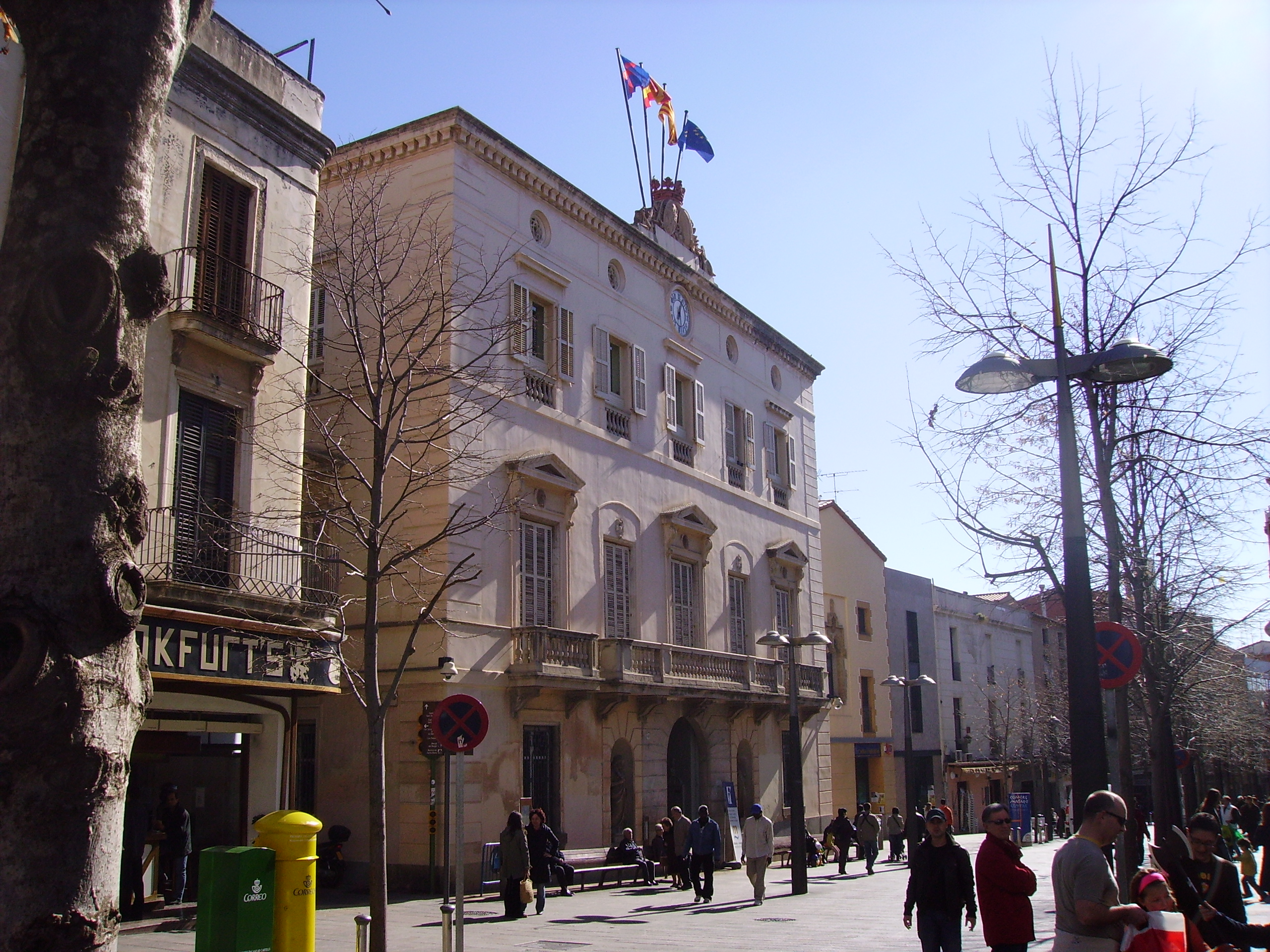
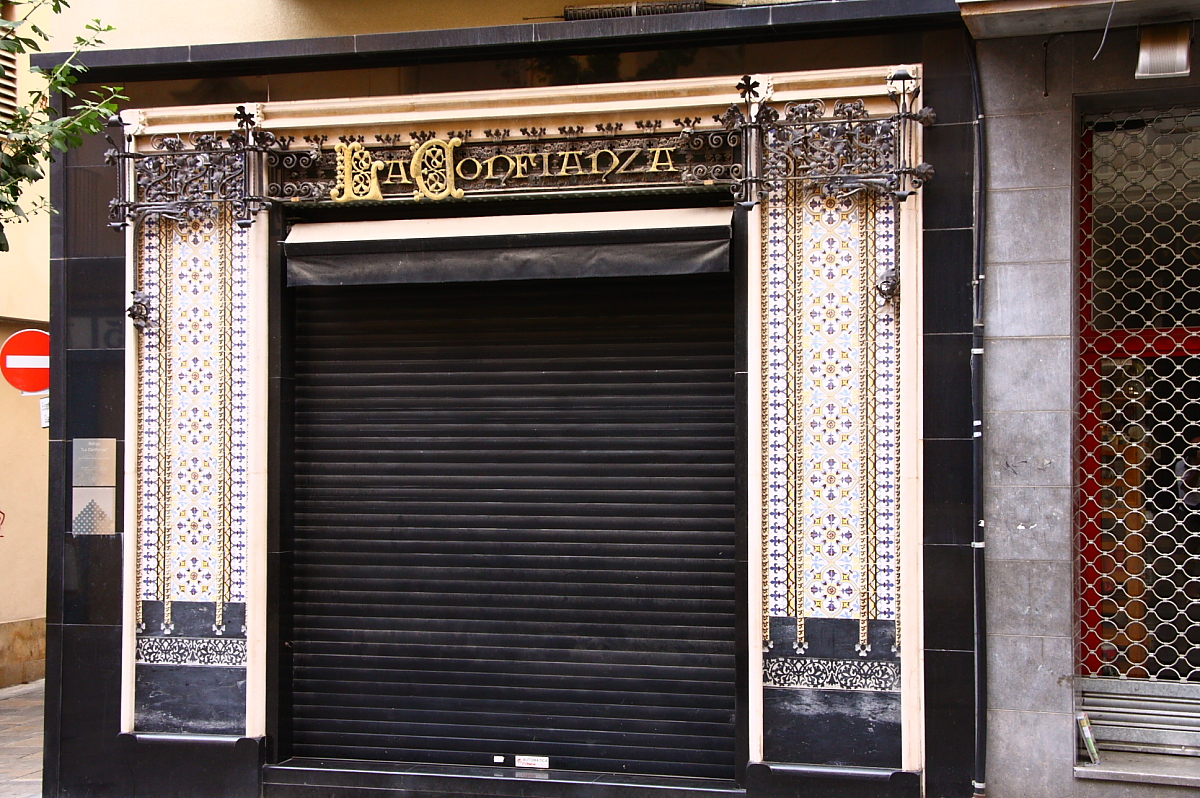
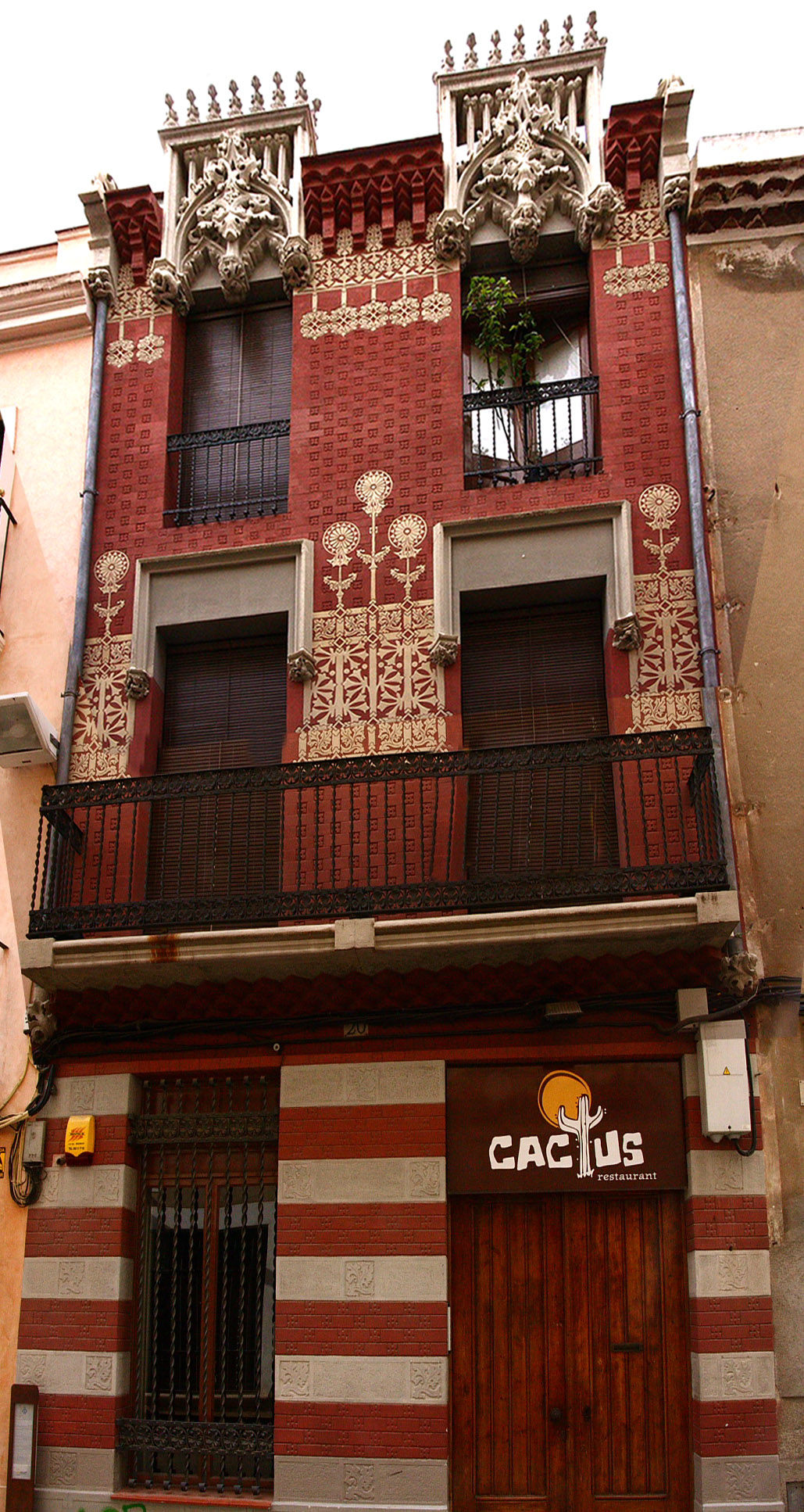
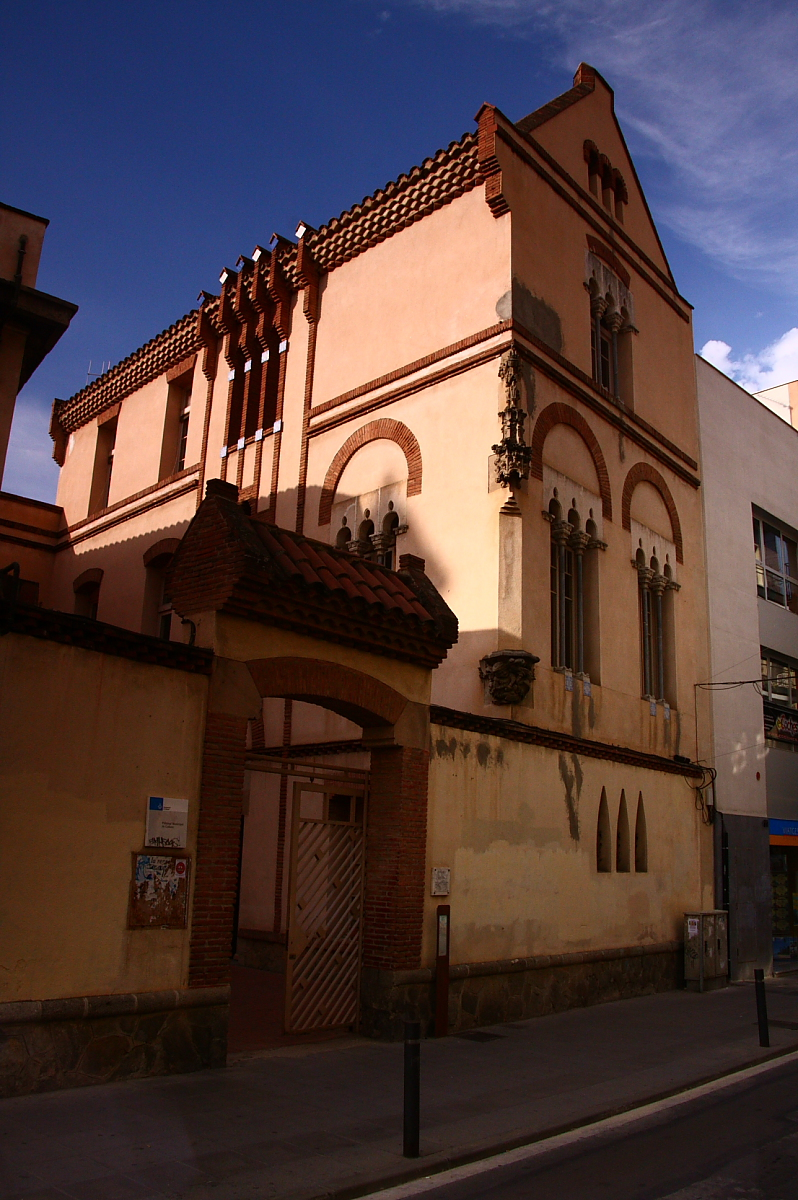
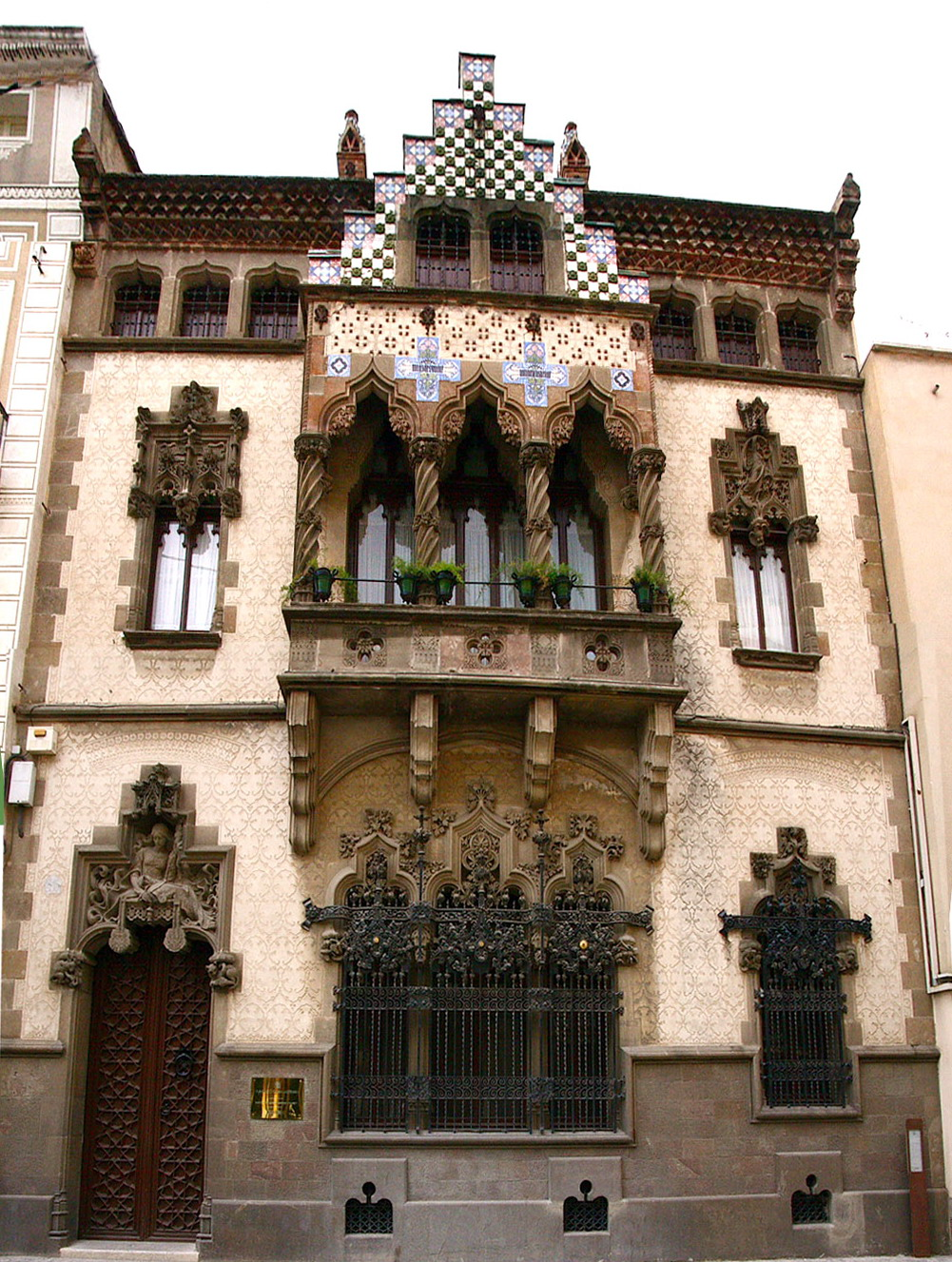
Year	Name	Location	Description	Condition	Image
1891	Casa Sisternes	C. Sant Simó, 18; 41°32′26.19″N 2°26′52.61″E	It is considered the first work of the architect. Highlights of the decorative lines of the façade of wrought iron combined with brick and tile, which define his style.	Bad
1893	Edifici del Rengle	Pl. Gran s/n 41°32′24.7″N 2°26′48.61″E	Building for the market stalls built by Emili Cabañes in 1891. Two years later, Puig i Cadafalch reformed it adding wrought ceramics to the roof and iron ornamental.	Good
1893	Reform to the Chamber of the City Council	La Riera, 48 41°32′23.24″N 2°26′41.21″E	Highlights the coffered ceiling of the Chamber, decorated with Catalan national symbols, coats and borders.	Good
1894	Store "la Confianza"	C. Sant Cristòfor, 10 41°32′22.75″N 2°26′48.74″E	Responsible for the interior decoration and furniture. Neo-Gothic elements and floral decoration. Opened in 1896.	Very good
1894	Casa Parera	C. Nou, 20 41°32′27.25″N 2°26′41.39″E	Remodelation of an old house with a neo-gothic elements, stucco and forge. engraved s flowers and vegetables. The sculptures on the façade are attributed to Eusebi Arnau.	Good
1894	La Beneficiencia	C. Sant Josep, 9 41°32′22.07″N 2°26′36.38″E	Charity house to house orphans and disadvantaged women's. Sober decoration with some coat of arms and statues by Eusebi Arnau in the capitals.	Good
1897	Casa Coll i Regàs	C. Argentona, 55 41°32′26.68″N 2°26′58.59″E	Private house commissioned by Joaquim Coll i Regàs combining the sculpture of Eusebi Arnau with sgraffitos, tiles, leaded windows.	Very good

=== Monistrol de Montserrat ===
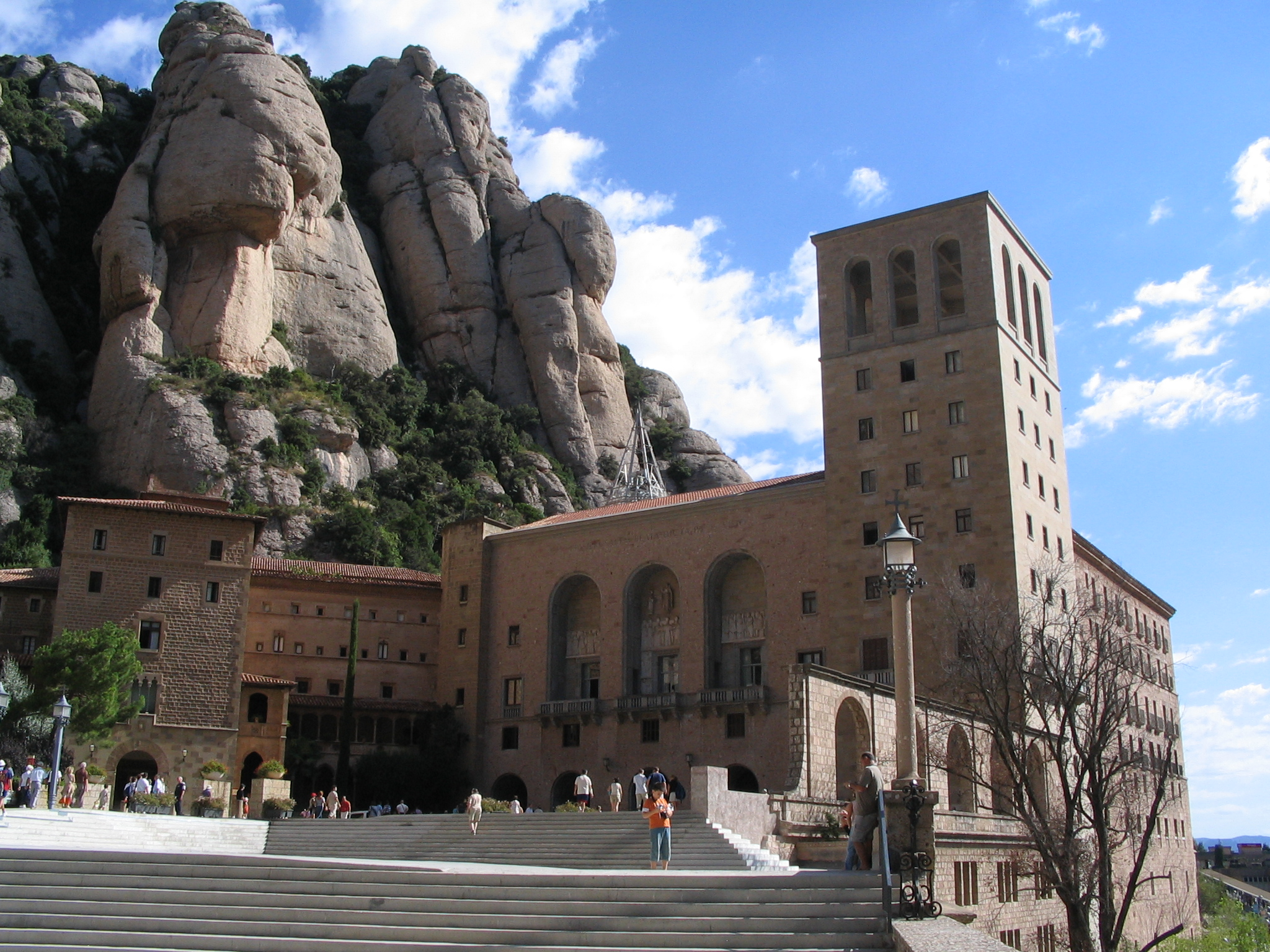
Year	Name	Location	Description	Condition	Image
1896	Fifth Mystery of Pain of the Monumental Rosary of Montserrat.	Way of the Santa Cova de Montserrat	It is the sculptural group of the Crucifixion of Jesus that was executed by sculptor Josep Llimona.	Good
1901	Third Mystery of Joyful of the Monumental Rosary of Montserrat.	Way of the Santa Cova de Montserrat	It is the sculptural group of the Birth of Jesus that was executed by sculptor Josep Llimona.	Good
1925–1928	Santa Maria de Montserrat	41°35′35.54″N 1°50′13.7″E	Construction of the neo-Romanesque cloister and the Plaça de Santa Maria; reform of the refectory of 17th century, the choir and the nursing; expansion of the library.	Good

=== el Prat de Llobregat ===
Year	Name	Location	Description	Condition	Image
1911	La Telegrafia	finca La Ricarda	Building commissioned for houses the English company Marconi Wireless Telegraph dedicated to the exploitation of telegraph. Puig i Cadalfach commissioned the work to local builder Josep Monés i Jané. It has two floors and is built on a medical floor built with piles of concrete and vaults. Today has been declared a cultural site of local interest since 1996.	Good

=== Sant Fruitós de Bages ===
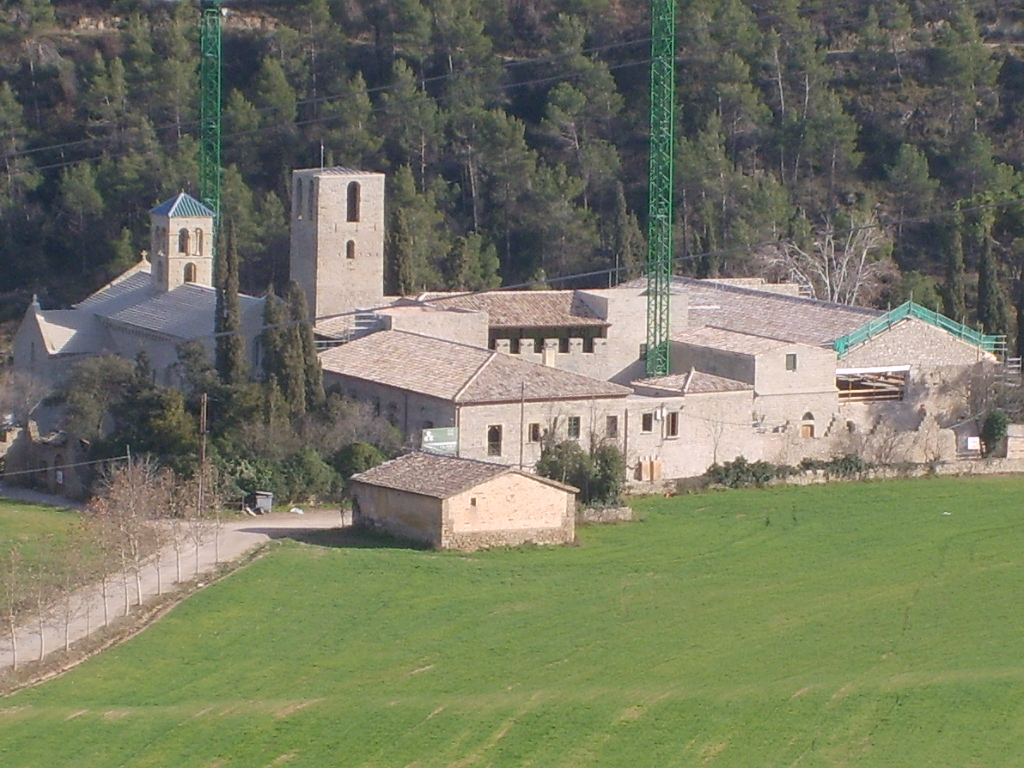
Year	Name	Location	Description	Condition	Image
1907	Monestir de Sant Benet de Bages	41°44′33.81″N 1°53′56.7″E	Restoration of the monastery commissioned by Ramon Casas, owner and friend of the architect.	Very good

=== Sant Quirze Safaja ===
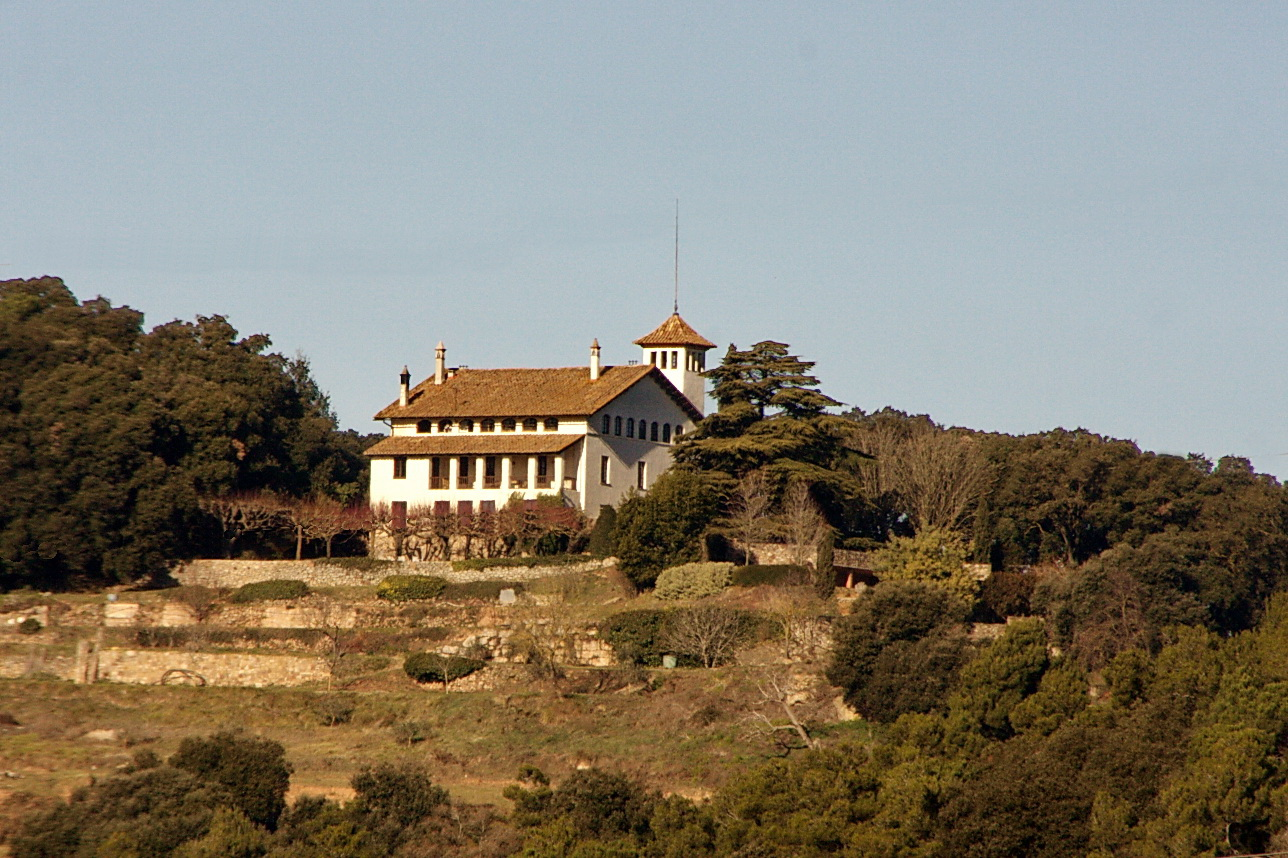
Year	Name	Location	Description	Condition	Image
1919	Casa Fargas	"El Maset"; 41°42′57.47″N 2°8′56″E	It was commissioned by Merce Fargas Raymat, mother of Ramon Trias Fargas and owner of the "Finca El Maset" name which the house is also called. The property was sold by heirs of original owner to the current owners. It is a square building with a tower, pointed to the extreme northwest. It has three floors and roof water to two with a large gallery on the south façade. The structure resembles the "Granja Terrades" of Seva.	Very good

=== Sant Sadurní d'Anoia ===
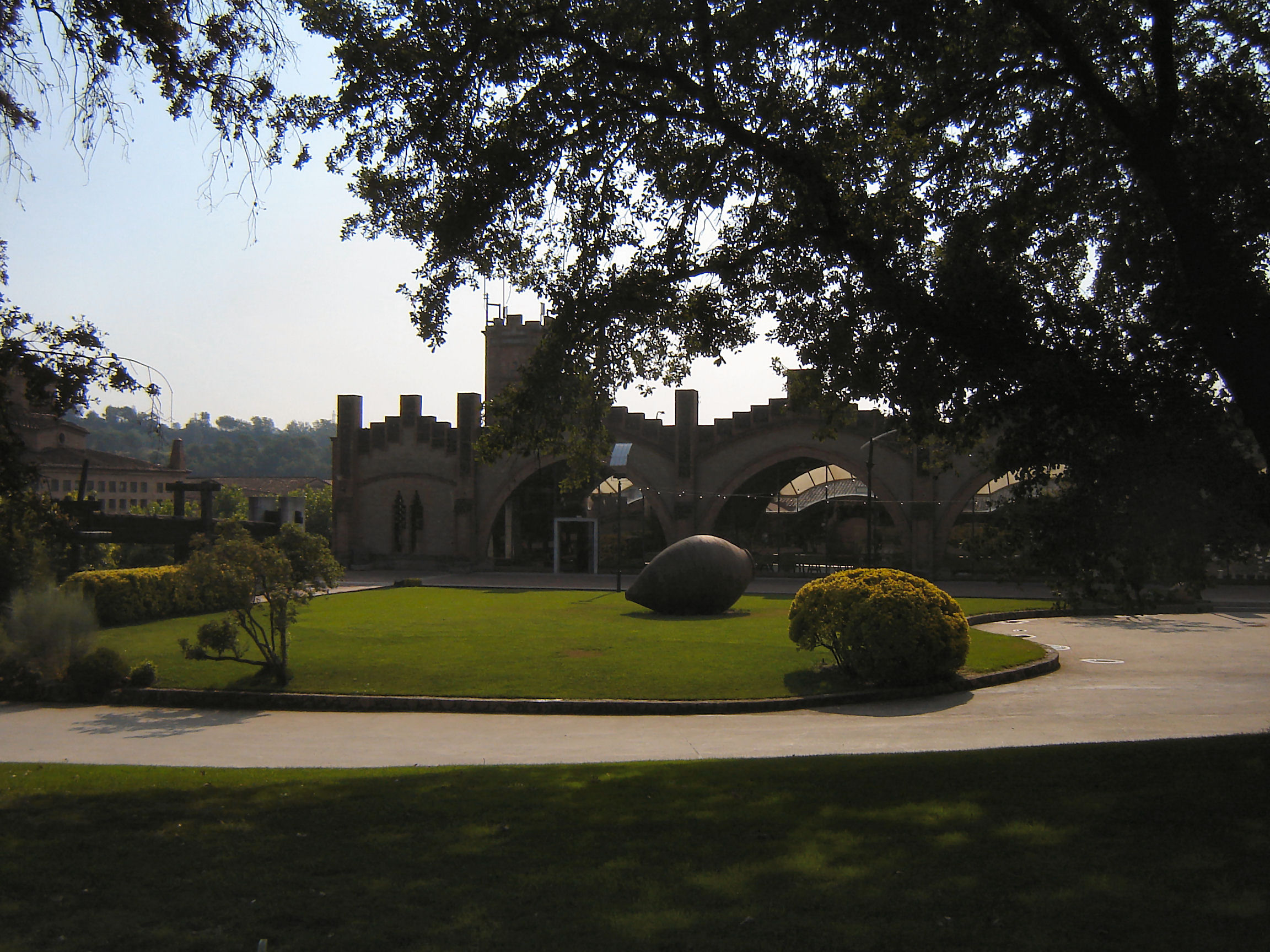
Year	Name	Location	Description	Condition	Image
1895–1920	Caves Codorniu	Can Codorniu 41°26′02″N 1°47′47″E	Work of industrial architecture driven by Manuel Raventós i Domènech for his family's Codorníu Winery. Consisting of several buildings and areas where Puig i Cadafalch found innovative solutions to each according to its functionality.	Very good
1904	Tower Codorniu	Can Codorniu	The main building or "big house" of the institution, is a square building with three towers, so that its profile is matched to that of the Casa de les Punxes.	Very good

=== Seva ===
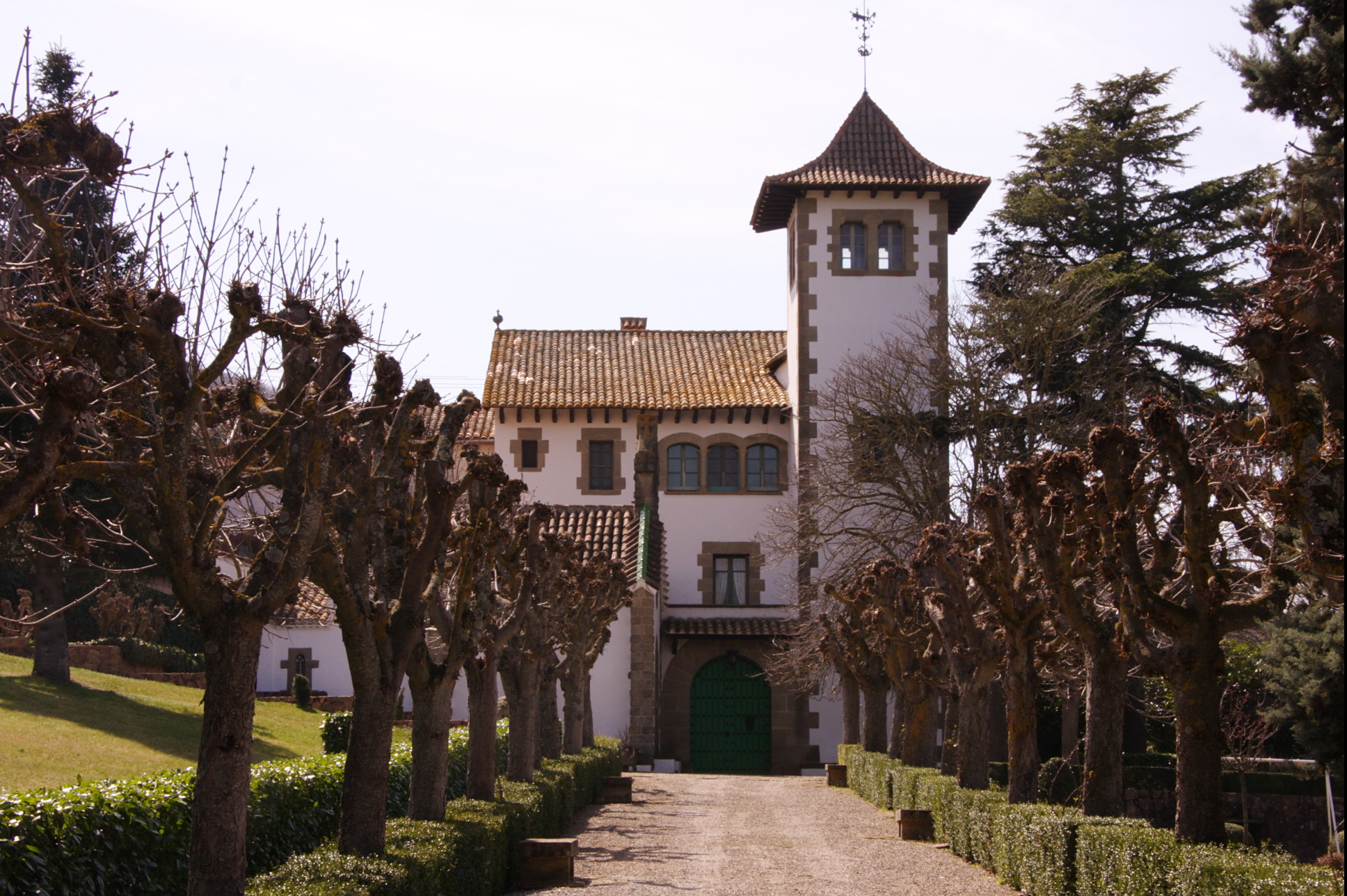
Year	Name	Location	Description	Condition	Image
1904	Granja Terrades	Ctra. de Seva a Viladrau 41°50′41.77″N 2°19′19.11″E	Modernisme house built next to Mas Sobrevia (12th century), name that is now known due have abandoned the functions of farm.	Very good

=== Tàrrega ===
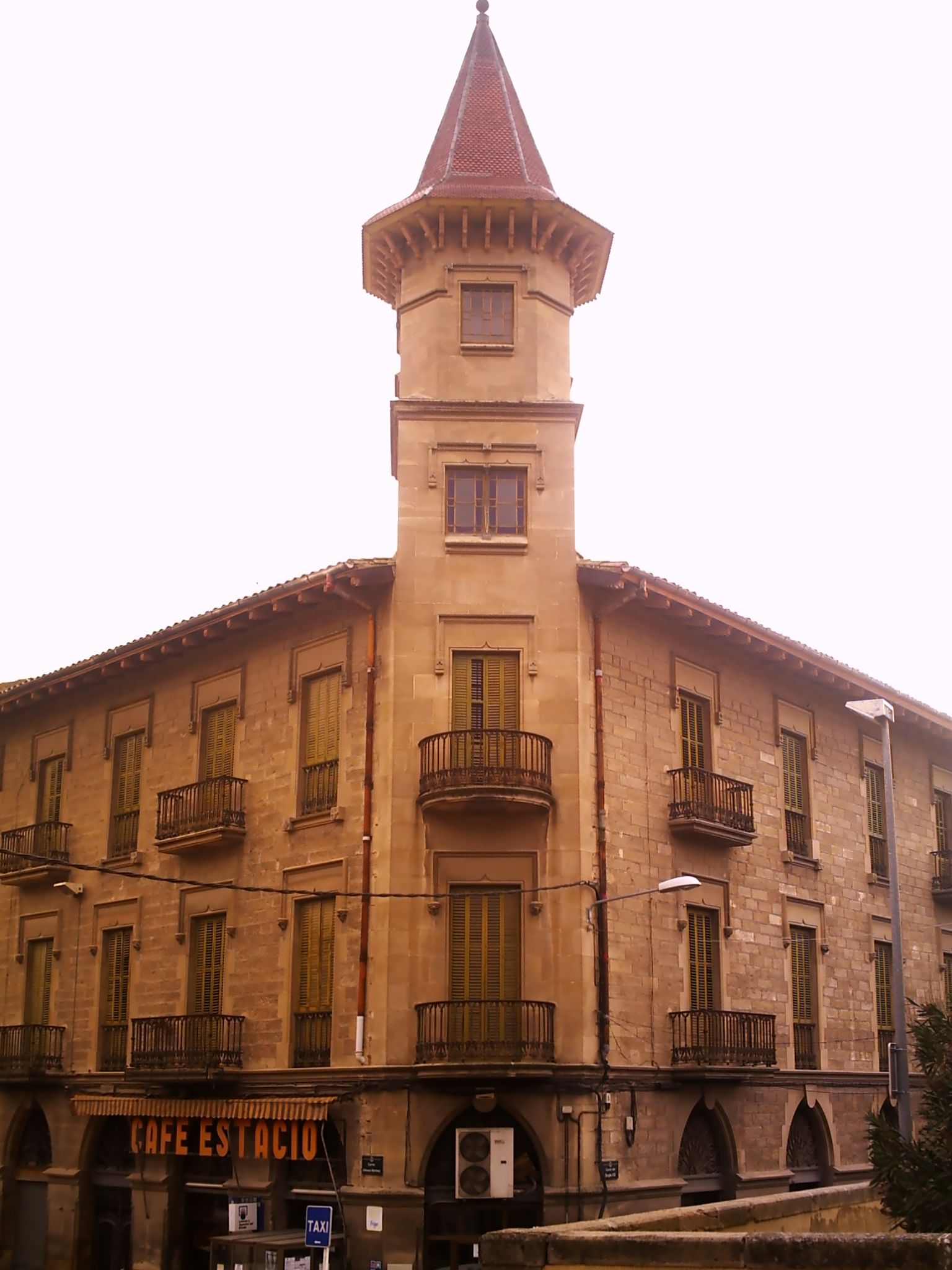
Year	Name	Location	Description	Condition	Image
1898	Cal Maimó	Carrer Alonso Martínez, 37 41°38′59.9″N 1°08′19.57″E	It has a pinnacle finished with some neo-Gothic ornamentation in the façade. It currently houses the charismatic establishment "Cafè Estació".	Very good

=== Viladrau ===
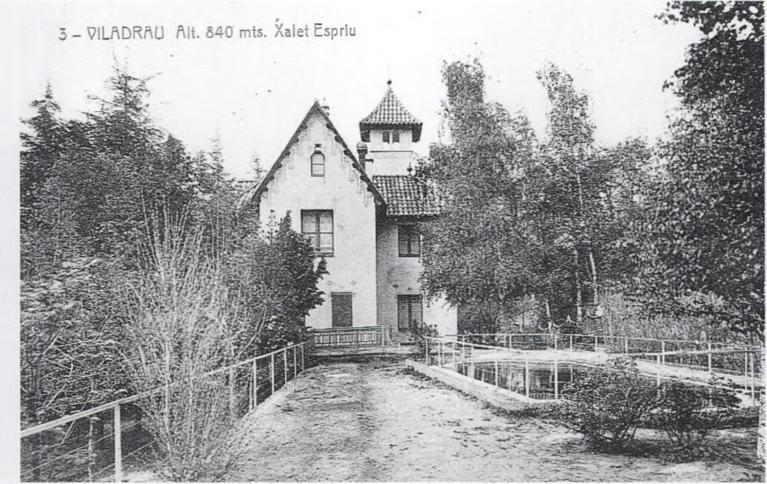
Year	Name	Location	Description	Condition	Image
1898	Casa Eusebi Bofill	?	Puig i Cadalfach built a detached house on use the chimney and the fireplace to articulate the space to Frank Lloyd Wright style, although it looked like based on Catalan masía had a highly ornamental neo-Gothic design.	?
1901	Villa Gloria – Can Capella	Viladrau – centre	Commissioned by the newspaper and publishing family of the Godo brothers as a holiday house. Originally called Villa Gloria and later changed to Can Capella. A modernista house with a 'Swiss chalet' styling, it was used as a regional command centre in the Civil war. The few changes since its construction include additional chimneys and slate tiles replacing the original yellow ceramic 'fish-scale' tiles on the curved rear terrace roof.	Restored 2005 using original materials
1900	Can Torra or Xalet Espriu		The house built in a Modernisme-neo-Gothic style was acquired in 1923 by the father Salvador Espriu and he spend long periods when a child was delicate of health. Later was transformed and highly denatured. Currently is known as Can Torra, named by the owners since the 1950s.	Very transformed	Original construction
1903	Casa Riera i Puig	Passeig de la Sanitat, 1	Family housing.	?

=== Viladecans ===
Year	Name	Location	Description	Condition	Image
1917	Casa Pilar Moragues	Camping el Toro Bravo	Summer house commissioned by the Moragues family. It is a house inspired in the rational style of Puig i Cadalfach, who built it on his second period, "the white time". It has a rectangular gabled roof, which was built to protect it from high groundwater, has ground floor, first floor, attic and cellar semiburied. Until recently had roles as holiday camp within the perimeter of the camping "El Toro Bravo". With the recent expansion of the Barcelona Airport, the building has been given to the City Council of Viladecans that it restored for a museum of the coastline park.	Very good

== Bibliography ==
- Albesa i Riba, Carles (1996). Postals del Montseny. Cavall Bernat, 29 (in Catalan). Vol. 2. Barcelona: L'Abadia de Montserrat. ISBN 84-7826-700-X.
- Banus Tort, Joan; Bosch de Doria, Marc; Sanroma, Pilar Vera (2001). Guia Puig i Cadafalch Mataró – Argentona (in Catalan, Spanish, and English). Mataró: Ajuntaments de Mataró i Argentona. ISBN 84-95127-64-4.
- Barral i Altet, Xavier, ed. (2003). "Josep Puig i Cadafalc: escrits d'arquitectura, art i política". Memòries de la Secció Històrico-Arqueològica (in Catalan) (62). Barcelona: Institut d'Estudis Catalans. ISBN 84-7283-717-3.
- Cabré, Tate; Blanch, Montserrat (2001). Blanch, Montserrat (ed.). Guia de la ruta Puig i Cadafalch (in Catalan). photos by Lluís Casals. Barcelona: Mediterrània. ISBN 84-8334-264-2.
- Cabré, Tate (2001). Guia de la ruta Puig i Cadafalch (in Spanish). Barcelona: Institut Municipal Del Paisatge Urbà i La Qualitat De Vida/Mediterrània. ISBN 84-8334-272-3.
- Casassas, Jordi (2005). Premsa cultural i intervenció política dels intel·lectuals a la Catalunya contemporània (1814-1975) (in Catalan). Barcelona: Universitat de Barcelona.ISBN 84-475-2975-4
- Cuspinera i Font, Lluís (1978). La Garriga: guia arquitectònica (in Catalan). Barcelona: Caixa de Pensions per a la Vellesa i d'Estalvis de Catalunya i Balears. ISBN 84-500-2806-X.
- Deulonder, Xavier (2017). França i Catalunya. Bubok Publishing.ISBN 8468504025
- Doménech Romá, Jorge (2013). Del Modernismo al Funcionalismo, características y evolución del movimiento modernista, el modernismo en Alcoy y Novelda (casos concretos) (in Spanish). Publicaciones de la Universidad de Alicante. ISBN 978-84-9717-267-7.
- Espriu, Salvador; Comas, Antoni (2007). Comas Lamarca, Mercè (ed.). Del seu afm. Espriu: correspondència de Salvador Espriu amb Antoni Comas (in Catalan). Barcelona: Abadia de Montserrat. ISBN 978-84-8415-908-7.
- MacKay, David (2003). "L'arquitectura domèstica de Puig i Cadafalch: un eco del dilema actual (estil o no estil)". In Balcells, Albert (ed.). Puig i Cadafalch i la Catalunya contemporània. Jornades Cientifiques, 13 (in Catalan). Barcelona: Institut d'Estudis Catalans. pp. 147–152. ISBN 84-7283-702-5.
- Navarra Ordoño, Andreu (2013). La región sospechosa. La dialéctica hispanocatalana entre 1875 y 1939 (in Spanish). Barcelona: Universitat Autónoma de Barcelona. ISBN 978-84-490-2984-4.
- Polo, Xavier (2005). Todos los catalanes son una mierda: les grans gestes contra el franquisme: la història d'una vida (PDF) (in Catalan). Introduction by Jordi Pujol. Barcelona: Proa. ISBN 84-8437-772-5. Archived from the original (PDF) on 11 January 2012.
- Fundació Caixa de Pensions, ed. (1989). Josep Puig i Cadafalch: arquitectura entre la casa i la ciutat [Josep Puig i Cadafalch: architecture between the house and the city] (in Catalan and English). Barcelona: La Fundació. ISBN 84-7664-239-3.
