= List of artists from the MNAC collection =

This is an alphabetical list of the names of artists with one or more works in the MNAC Collection in Barcelona, of the Museu Nacional d'Art de Catalunya (MNAC), or its funds, as of 2012.

== A ==
Juan de la Abadía, Fidel Aguilar, Francisco Agustín y Grande, Francesco Albani, José Alemany Bori, Domingo Álvarez Enciso, Ramon Amadeu i Grau, Josep Amat Pagès, Blai Ametller, Antonio Amorosi, Hermen Anglada Camarasa, Joan Antigó, José Antolínez, Ulrich Apt, Andrés de Araoz, Antoni Arissa, Manel Armengol, Emili Armengol Gall, Josep Armet Portanell, Eusebi Arnau i Mascort, Josep Arrau i Barba, Gioacchino Assereto, Jean Audran.

== B ==
Sisto Badalocchio, Lluís Bagaria, Dionís Baixeras i Verdaguer, Baccio Bandinelli, Rafael Barradas Pérez, Laureà Barrau Buñol, Jean-Jacques Barre, Arnau Bassa, Ferrer Bassa, Jacopo Bassano, Enric Bassas, Ramon Batlles Fontanet, Battista Dossi, Achile Battistuzzi, Manuel Bayeu, Francisco Bayeu, Robert Anning Bell, Rafael Benet Vancells, Josep Berga i Boix, Bartolomé Bermejo, Martín Bernat, Pedro Berruguete, Aureliano de Beruete, Neri di Bicci, Felipe Bigarny, Miquel Blay i Fàbregas, Herri Met de Bles, Giovani Boccati, Francesc Boix, Giambologna, Lluís Bonifaç i Massó, Lluís Bonnín i Martí, Enric de Borgonya, Honorat Borrassà, Lluís Borrassà, François Boucher, Louis-Eugène Boudin, Albrecht Bouts, William Henry Bradley, Frank Brangwyn, Cecco Bravo, Ayne Bru, Lluís Bru Salelles, Joan Brull, Joan de Burgunya, Edward Burne-Jones, Joan Busquets i Jané, Bernardino Butinone.

== C ==
Antoni Caba, Paolo Caliari, Josep Camaron i Bonanat, Francisco Camilo, Antoni Campañà, Damià Campeny, Canaletto, Ricard Canals, Alonso Cano, Manuel Capdevila i Massana, Leonetto Cappiello, Armand Auguste Caqué, Claudi Carbonell, Artur Carbonell i Carbonell, Cesare Carnevali, Annibale Carracci, Ludovico Carracci, Joan Carreras Farré, Josep Maria Casals i Ariet, Enric Casanovas Roy, Antoni Casanovas i Torrents, Enric Casanovas, Pere Casas Abarca, Ramon Casas i Carbó, Jaume Cascalls, José del Castillo, Henri Cassiers, Giovanni Benedetto Castiglione, José del Castillo, Pere Català Pic, Francesc Català-Roca, Toni Catany, Bernardo Cavallino, Cenni di Francesco di Ser Cenni, Agustí Centelles, Mateo Cerezo, Giacomo Ceruti, Jules Chéret, Francisco de Cidón Navarro, Giacomo Francesco Cipper, Jaume Cirera, Antoni Claperós, Josep Clarà, Enric Clarasó, Pelegrí Clavé, Antoni Clavé Sanmartí, Josep Closa Miralles, Claudio Coello, Colita, Joan Colom Agustí, Joan Colom i Altemir, Francesc Comes, Francesco del Cossa, Lorenzo Costa, Pere Costa, Edward Gordon Craig, Lucas Cranach the Elder, Ricard Crespo, Leandre Cristòfol, Pere Crusells, Diego de la Cruz, Modest Cuixart Tàpies, Josep Cusachs, Manuel Cusí Ferret.

== D ==
Salvador Dalí, Lluís Dalmau, André-Adolphe-Eugène Disdéri, Francesc Domingo, Ludovico Alise de Donati, Willem Drost.

== E ==
El Diví, Feliu Elias, Lambert Escaler, Manuel Esclusa, Joaquim Espalter, Antonio María Esquivel, Baldassare d'Este, Enrique de Estencop, Francesc Esteve.

== F ==
Antoni Fabrés i Costa, Henry Guy Fangel, Manuel Feliu de Lemus, Enric Ferau i Alsina, Ferdinando dei Ritratti, Pere Fernández, Ángel Ferrant Vázquez, Jaume Ferrer, Joan Ferrer Miró, Giovanni da Fiesole, Mino da Fiesole, Alfred Figueras, Joaquim Figuerola Fernández, Josep Bernat Flaugier, Govert Flinck, Marià Foix i Prats, Enric Folgosa Martí, Francesc Fontanals Rovirosa, Joan Fontcuberta, Damià Forment, Pere Formiguera, Marià Fortuny Marsal, Fra Angelico, Jean-Honoré Fragonard, Jacques de França, Vincenzo Frediani, Ferran Freixa, Francis Frith, Arthur Burdett Frost, Manuel Fuxà Leal.

== G ==
Taddeo Gaddi, Thomas Gainsborough, Francesc d'Assís Galí Fabra, Fernando Gallego, Gaspare Galliari, Baldomer Galofre, Enric Galwey García, Josep Gamot Llúria, Raffaellino del Garbo, Pere Garcia de Benavarri, Antoni Garcia Lamolla, Pau Gargallo, Joan Gascó, Pere Gascó, Joaquim Gassó Jou, Antoni Gaudí, Georges Gaudy, Francesc Gazan, Vincenzo Gemito, Guerau Gener, Felice Giani, Corrado Giaquinto, Francesc Gimeno, Luca Giordano, Piero di Giovanni, Emili Godes i Hurtado, Simó Gómez, Joaquim Gomis, Antonio González Velázquez, Juli González Pellicer, José Victoriano González-Pérez, Gordon Craig, Xavier Gosé, Jan Gossaert, Francisco de Goya, Lluís Graner, Blasco de Grañén, Eugène Samuel Grasset, Joan Grau, il Grechetto, el Greco, Juan Gris, Grup Vergós, Adrià Gual Queralt, Jordi Guillumet, José de Gutiérrez Solana.

== H ==
Carlos de Haes, Noël Hallé, Juan van der Hamen y Leon, Adriaen Hanneman, John Hassall, Richard Heintz, Francisco Herrera, Adolf Hohenstein, Gaspar Homar, Pieter de Hooch, Wolf Huber, Manolo Hugué, Jaume Huguet, Manuel Humbert Esteve.

== J ==
Jacopo Bassano, Jacques de França, Eduard Jener Casellas, Eduard Jener González, Joan de Joanes, Joan de Tournai, Laurent Jiménez-Balaguer, Pere Joan, Jordi de Déu, Josep Maria Jujol, Antoni Juyol.

== K ==
Katsukawa Shun'ei, Edward Keïl, Bernardo Keilhau, Keisei Eisen, Adriaen Thomasz Key, Kikukawa Eizan.

== L ==
Francesc Labarta Planas, Francesc Lacoma i Fontanet, Francesc Lacoma i Sans, Manuel Laguillo, Giovanni Lanfranco, Nicolas de Largillière, Charles Le Brun, Joseph Christian Leyendecker, Josep Maria Lladó i Bausili, Joan Llaverias Labró, Joan Llimona i Bruguera, Josep Llimona i Bruguera, Joan Llobet, Jaume Llongueras Badia, Josep Llorens Artigas, Martí Llorens, Otho Saint Clair Lloyd, Lo Grech, Lo Scheggia, Lo Spagnoletto, Giovanni da Lodi, Alfonso Lombardi, Antoine de Lonhy, Diego Lopes, Bernat López Piquer, Vicent López i Portaña, Claudi Lorenzale, Lorenzo Mónaco, Lorenzo Lotto, Eugenio Lucas Velázquez, Sebastiano Luciani, Giuseppe Lucini, Battista Luteri, Giovanni Luteri.

== M ==
Jan Mabuse, Joan Macip, Vicent Macip, Federico de Madrazo, Mariano Salvador Maella Pérez, Francesco Maffei, Juan Bautista Maíno, Carles Mani, Kim Manresa, Carlo Maratta, Esteve March, Tomaso de Marchis, Ricard Marlet Saret, Mariano Ignasi Marroyo Rodriguez, Ramon Martí Alsina, Juan Martínez Montañés, José Martínez Sánchez, Bernat Martorell, Arcadi Mas i Fondevila, Josep Masana, Masillo, Oriol Maspons, Francesc Masriera, Josep Masriera, Lluís Masriera i Rosés, Joan Mates, Jaume Mateu, Salvador Mayol, Filippo Mazzola, Eliseu Meifrèn, Luis Egidio Meléndez, Andrés de Melgar, Pedro de Mena Medrano, Anton Raphael Mengs, Lorenzo Mercadante de Bretaña, Benet Mercadé, Jaume Mercadé i Queralt, Antonio Mercar, Mestre Alexander, Mestre d'Albatàrrec, Master of l'Adoració Thyssen, Master of l'Adoració von Groote, Mestre d'Albesa, Mestre d'Anglesola, Mestre d'Astorga, Master of Baltimore, Master of Boí, Master of Castelsardo, Master of Cruïlles, Master of la Conquesta de Mallorca, Master of l'Epifania d'Anvers, Mestre d'Estopanyà, Master of Forlì, Master of Frankfurt, Mestre Jacobo, Master ofl Judici Final, Master of Lanaja, Master of la Madonna Cini, Master of les mitges figures, Master of Palanquinos, Master ofl Papagai, Master of Pau i Bernabeu, Master of Pedralbes, Master of Pedret, Master of la Porciúncula, Master of Retascón, Master of Riglos, Master of Rubió, Master of Sant Esteve d'Andorra, Master of Sant Mateu, Master of Sant Pau de Casserres, Master of Santa Coloma d'Andorra, Master of Santa Coloma de Queralt, Master of Taüll, Master of la Seu d'Urgell (segle XII) i Master of la Seu d'Urgell (segle XIV), Master of Sixena, Master of Soriguerola, Master of Sorpe, Master of Vallbona de les Monges, Master of Villahermosa, Master of 1518, Apel·les Mestres, Cornelis Mestys, Quinten Metsys, Constantin Meunier, Henri Meunier, Hans Mielich, Tommaso Minardi, Joaquim Mir, Josep Mirabent i Gatell, Francesc Miralles i Galaup, Joan Miró Ferrà, Xavier Miserachs, Michel Molart, Pasqual Pere Moles, Esteve Monegal Prat, Monsu Bernardo, Bartolomeo Montagna, Pau Montaña i Cantó, Pere Pau Montaña i Llanas, Tomàs Moragas, Pere Moragues, Luis de Morales, Jacint Morató, Jaume Morera i Galícia, Alphonse-Marie Mucha, Philipp Heinrich Müller, Ramon de Mur.

== N ==
Robert Peters Napper, Harold E. H. Nelson, Rossend Nobas, Xavier Nogués, Isidre Nonell, Pere Nunyes.

== O ==
Josep Obiols i Palau, Jordi Olivé i Salvador, Pere Oller, Ricard Opisso i Sala, Eugeni d'Ors i Rovira, Salvador Ortiga Torres, José Ortiz-Echagüe, Jaume Otero Camps.

== P ==
Michele Pace, Michael Pacher, Tomàs Padró, Ramon Padró i Pijoan, Juan Pantoja de la Cruz, Francesc Xavier Parcerisa i Boada, Gregorio Pardo, Antoni Parera, Luis Paret y Alcázar, Maxfield Parrish, Josep Pascó i Mensa, Jean-Baptiste Pater, Josep Lluís Pellicer, Edward Penfield, Joseph Pennell, Gonçal Peris Sarrià, Perugino, Josep Pey, Giambattista Piazzetta, Pablo Picasso, Ramon Pichot i Gironès, Marià Pidelaserra, Piero di Giovanni, Sebastiano del Piombo, Giovanni Battista Piranesi, Pitocchetto, Giovanni Battista Pittoni, Francesc Pla, Joaquim Pla Janini, Eusebi Planas, Bonaventura Planella i Conxello, Josep Planella i Coromina, Antonio del Pollaiuolo, Leopoldo Pomés, Joan Ponç Bonet, Joan Porqueras, Ludovico Pozzetti, Josep Prat, Francisco Preciado de la Vega, Mattia Preti, Henri Privat-Livemont, Camilo Procaccini, Pseudo-boccaccino, Josep Puig i Cadafalch, Josep Puiggarí i Llobet.

== Q ==
Pieter Quast, Maurice Quentin de La Tour, Agustí Querol Subirats.

== R ==
Luigi Rados, Paolo de Ragusa, Armand Rassenfosse, Nicolau Raurich Petre, Tomaso Realfonzo, Joan Rebull Torroja, Ethel Reed, Darío de Regoyos, Hans Reinhart, Joan Reixac, Dionís Renart García, Joaquim Renart García, Josep Renau Berenguer, Miguel Renom, Josep Reynés, Francesc Ribalta, Joan Ribalta, Jorge Ribalta, Josep de Ribera, Romà Ribera, Segimon Ribó i Mir, Sebastiano Ricci, Pau Rigalt i Fargas, Lluís Rigalt i Farriols, Hyacinthe Rigaud, Alexandre de Riquer i Ynglada, Humberto Rivas, Francisco Rizi, Bartomeu de Robió, Jacopo Robusti, Vicenç Rodés i Aries, Auguste Rodin, Francesc Rodríguez Pusat, Joan Roig i Soler, Joan Roig Solé, Giovanni Francesco Romanelli, Eduardo Rosales Gallina, Henri Roussel, Peter Paul Rubens, Santiago Rusiñol, Salomon Jacobsz van Ruysdael.

== S ==
Olga Nicolajevna Sacharoff, Juan Battista Sacchetti, Marc Safont, Andreu Sala, Josep Sala Tarragó, Giovanni Battista Salvi, Manuel Salvador Carmona, Juan Sánchez de Castro, Pere Sanglada, Jaume Sans, Jean-Baptiste Santerre, Paolo da San Leocadio, Llorenç Saragossà, Ramon Sarsanedas, Segon Mestre de Bierge, Segon Mestre de Boí, Segon Mestre de Puigcerdà, Segon Mestre de Santa Maria de Taüll, Segon Mestre de Sorpe, Guillem Seguer, Agustí Sellent Torrents, Giovanni di Ser Giovanni, Pere Serafí, Antoni Serra Fiter, Eudald Serra Güell, Enric Serra Auqué, Josep Serra i Abella, Jaume Serra, Pere Serra, Josep Maria Sert i Badia, Josep Lluís Sert, Giuseppe Signorini, Diego de Siloé, Gil de Siloé, Joseph W. Simpson, Ton Sirera, Alfred Sisley, Ismael Smith Marí, Antoni Solà, Rafael Solanic Balius, Francisco de Solís, Francesc Soler i Rovirosa, Joaquim Sorolla Bastida, Massimo Stanzione, Gherardo Starnina, Théophile Alexandre Steinlen, August Stoehr, Matthias Stomer, Bernhard Strigel, Jeroni Suñol Pujol, Ramon Sunyer Clarà, Joaquim Sunyer Miró.

== T ==
Vincenzo Tamagni, Josep Maria Tamburini, Antoni Tàpies, Josep Tapiró Baró, Torquato Tasso, Teresa d'Entença, Ricard Terré i Marcellés, Doménikos Theotokópoulos, Giambattista Tiepolo, Giandomenico Tiepolo, Guillem Timor, il Tintoretto, Tiziano Vecellio, Todeschini, Josep de Togores, Juan Tol, Pere Torné Esquius, Francesc Torrescassana, Joaquim Torres-García, Henri de Toulouse-Lautrec, Josep Maria Tous Jové, Joan de Tournai, Fernand Toussaint, Otto Tragy, Francesc Tramulles, Manuel Tramulles i Roig, Nicolau Travé, Josep Triadó Mayol, Niccolò Tribolo, François de Troy.

== U ==
Manel Úbeda, Pietro Urbano, Ricard Urgell Carreras, Modest Urgell Inglada, Utagawa Kunisada, Utagawa Kuniyasu I, Miquel Utrillo.

== V ==
Andrea Vaccaro, Alejo de Vahía, Juan de Valdés Leal, Agapit Vallmitjana Abarca, Agapit Vallmitjana i Barbany, Venanci Vallmitjana i Barbany, Ignaci Valls, Carle Vanloo, Joaquim Vayreda, Diego Velázquez, Il Veronese, Francesc Vidal i Jevellí, Frederic Vidal i Puig, Élisabeth-Louise Vigée Le Brun, Antoni Viladomat, Aleardo Villa, Josep Vives, Ferdinand Voet.

== X ==
Miguel Ximénez, Rafael Ximeno i Planes

== Z ==
Domenico Zampieri, Bonanat Zaortiga, Tadeo Zuccari, Ignacio Zuloaga Zabaleta, Francisco de Zurbarán, Juan de Zurbarán.
