= Baldomer Gili i Roig =

Spanish painter

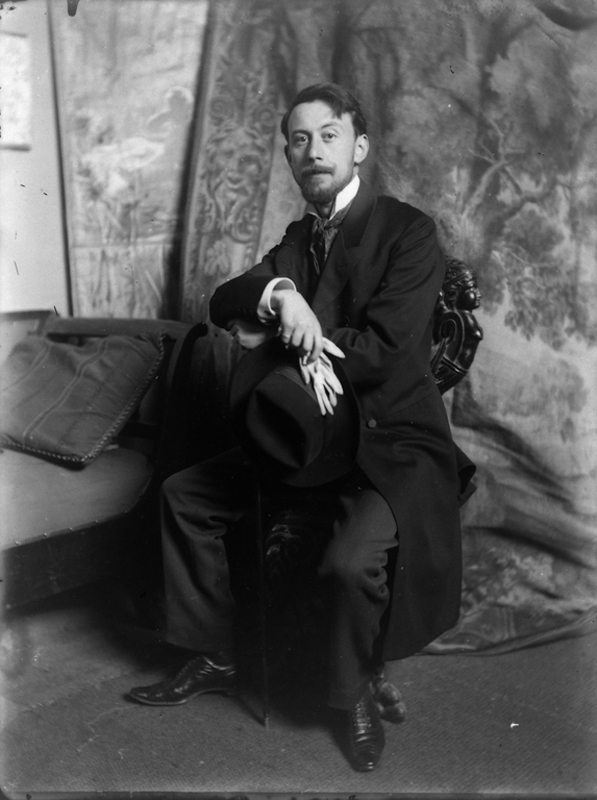
Baldomer Gili i Roig (1900s, self-taken)

Baldomer Gili i Roig (19 October 1873, Lleida – 31 December 1926, Barcelona) was a Spanish painter, draftsman and photographer.

== Biography ==
His father was a teacher and editor. His brother, Gustau (Gustavo, 1868–1945), became the founder of Editorial Gustavo Gili, a major publishing company. In 1882, the family moved to Irun, where he began his first art lessons with José Salís Camino, a marine artist and follower of Camille Corot. Six years later, the family returned to Barcelona and he enrolled at the Escola de la Llotja. It was there that he came under the influence of the Sorollistas and brightened his palette.

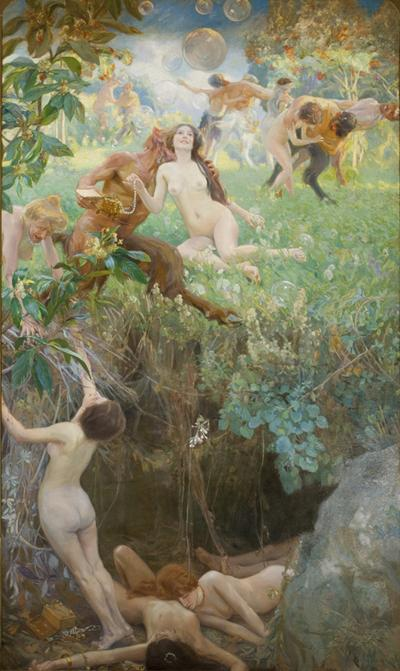
The Abyss (1906)

In 1890, he decided to go to Madrid and enter the "Escuela Especial de Pintura, Escultura y Grabado", attending the classes of Alejo Vera, who he admired. Seven years later, he ventured to Munich to further his studies at the Academy of Fine Arts, but was obliged to return home a year later due to the political crisis occasioned by the beginning of the Spanish–American War. In 1899, he had his first exhibition at the Sala Parés.

The following year, he held his first showing in his hometown and, with the help of Jaume Morera, received a stipend from the local government to study in Italy. At first, he lived in a Capuchin monastery near Rome, in Frascati, then at the Villa Strohl Fern in the Villa Borghese. While there, he sent paintings back to Lleida (to show that he was fulfilling the conditions of his stipend), and to an exposition in Paris. In 1901, he participated in the National Exhibition of Fine Arts.

=== A variety of interests ===
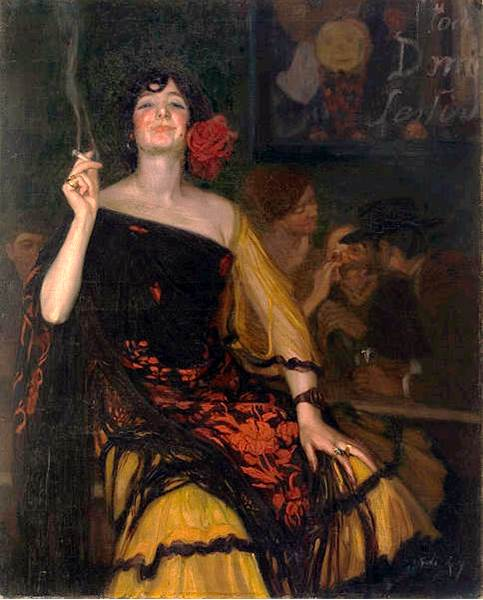
La Ricitos (1912). Loosely translated: "The Woman of the Little Curls" (of smoke?)

After four years, he returned to Barcelona. In addition to his paintings, he provided illustrations for several notable publications, including L'Esquella de la Torratxa. Many of his drawings were signed "L'Alegret" (possibly a reference to Alegret, the Gascon troubadour). He also tried his hand at being a playwright. In 1909, the Teatre Apolo premiered his musical comedy La Canción de la Ninfa; written under the nom-de-plume "Emilio Roig", with music by Pedro Enrique de Ferrán.

He was fascinated with photography as well and almost always went about with a camera on hand, producing over a thousand glass plates, documenting the places and people in his life, which his descendants presented to the Museu d'Art Jaume Morera in 2009. In fact, he had helped to organize the museum; travelling to Paris in 1915 to retrieve the paintings left there by Xavier Gosé, which would be the museum's first major acquisition.

Over the next decade, he continued to exhibit frequently and widely throughout Europe and South America, visiting Buenos Aires and Montevideo in 1925. He died of pneumonia at the end of 1926.
