= Todeschini =

Todeschini may refer to:

- Bruno Todeschini (born 1962), Swiss actor
- Federico Todeschini (born 1975), Argentine rugby player
- Jean-Marc Todeschini (born 1952), French politician
- Paolo Todeschini (1920–1993), Italian footballer
- Giacomo Francesco Cipper, also known as Il Todeschini - Austrian-Italian still life painter
- Giacomo Todeschini (born 1950), Italian historian
- Pope Pius III (1439–1503), born Francesco Todeschini
