= Darío de Regoyos =

Spanish painter (1857–1913)

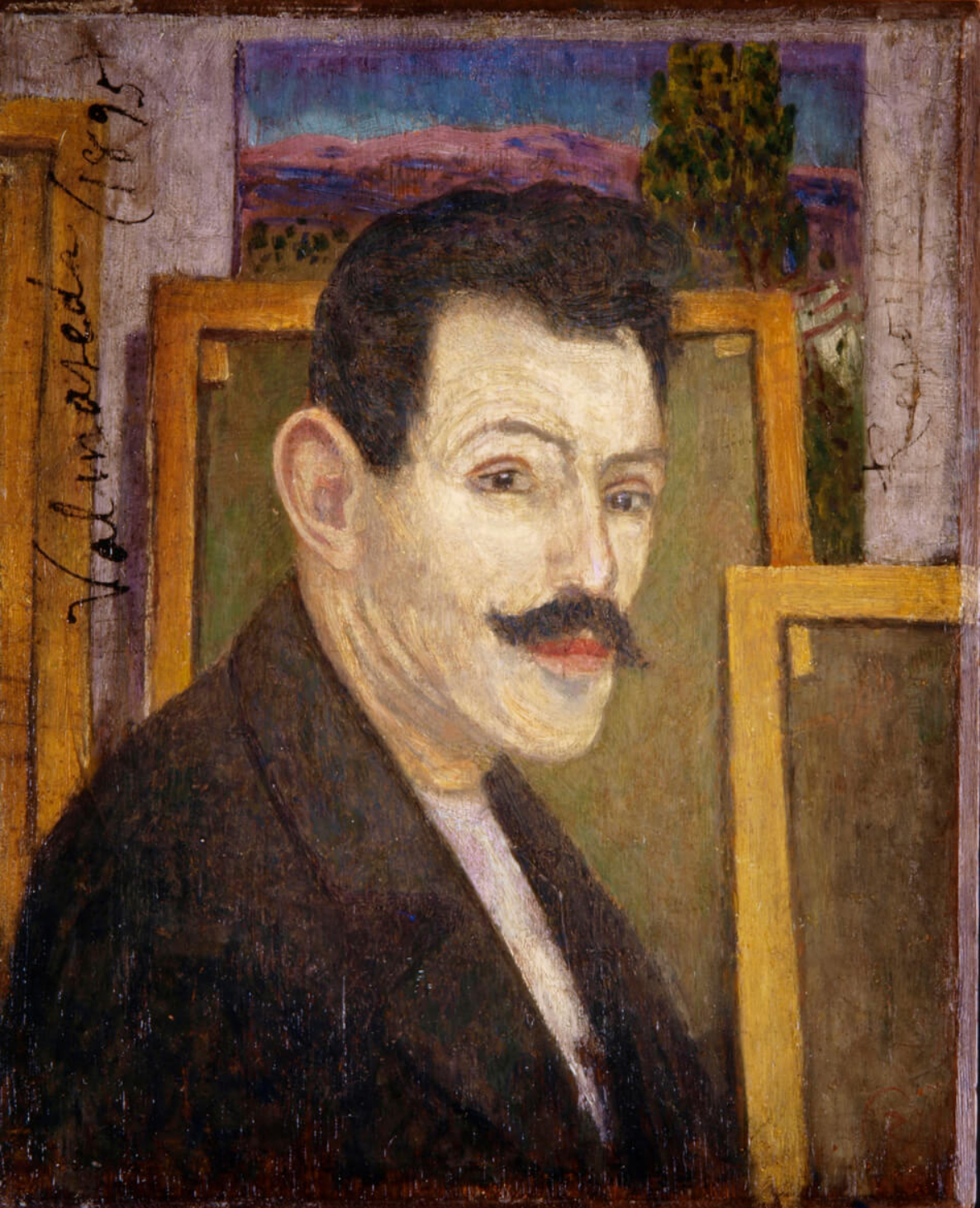
- Self-portrait of Darío de Regoyos y Valdés, which was featured on the 0,43€ stamp of Spain
- Born: November 1, 1857
- Died: October 29, 1913 (aged 55)
- Resting place: Sant Gervasi Cemetery, Barcelona
- Occupation: painter
- Known for: Notable for contributing to "the renewal of modern Spanish painting"

Darío de Regoyos y Valdés (November 1, 1857 – October 29, 1913) was a Spanish painter. He was notable for contributing to "the renewal of modern Spanish painting". A student of Carlos de Haes at the Real Academia de Bellas Artes de San Fernando in 1878, he later studied at the Académie Royale des Beaux-Arts in Brussels. He traveled extensively in the 1880s, accompanied by his friend, the painter Adolfo Guiard. He was a member of the art group L'Essor and a founding member of Les XX with the Belgian avant-garde scene. During these experiences he gained a significant influence from Impressionist and Neo-Impressionist painters.

His works include El paseo de Alderdi Eder (1894), Penaas de Duranguesado, La España Negra: Víctimas de la fiesta (1894), Mercado de Villarnaca de Oria (1909), Gallinero (1912) and Polluelos (1912). Though his work was not very popular during his lifetime, after his death, a tribute exhibition was devoted to him in the Biblioteca Nacional de España in Madrid. Collections of his art are held by the Bilbao Fine Arts Museum, the Museu Nacional d'Art de Catalunya in Barcelona, Abelló Museum in Vallès Oriental, and the Carmen Thyssen Museum in Málaga. He died in 1913 and was buried in the Sant Gervasi Cemetery, Barcelona.

== Early years ==
Regoyos was born in Ribadesella, the son of Darío Regoyos Morenillo, an architect and assistant of Public Works. In his youth, he moved to Madrid, entering the Real Academia de Bellas Artes de San Fernando in 1878. He was a student of Belgian Carlos de Haes. Invited by friends Enrique Fernández Arbós and Isaac Albéniz, and following the advice of Haes, Regoyos visited Brussels in the following year. He studied at the Académie Royale des Beaux-Arts and lived in the Belgian capital for ten years, his patron being Edmond Picard, who introduced him to the thriving art world in Brussels.

== Career ==
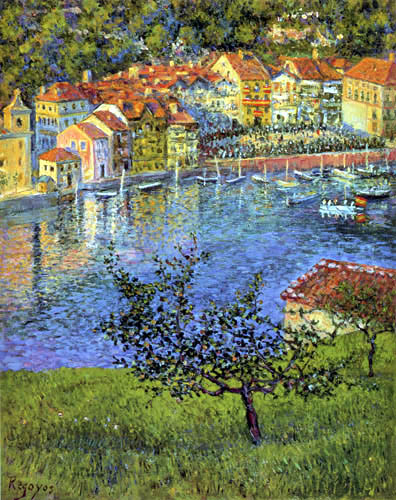
An En plein air work by Darío de Regoyos.

Between 1881 and 1893, he travelled between Belgium, the Netherlands, and Spain. In 1882, he travelled to Morocco and Spain with Théo van Rysselberghe and Frantz Charlet. In the 1880s, he made several trips to Paris, accompanied by his friend, painter Adolfo Guiard. During these experiences he gained a significant influence from Impressionist and Neo-Impressionist painters. He encouraged exhibitions, concerts and other cultural activities in order to develop modern art in Belgium. As such, he was a member of the art group L'Essor and a founding member of Les XX with the Belgian avant-garde scene. He mixed with painters such as Théo van Rysselberghe and Frantz Charlet, Pissarro, Seurat, and Signac. Regarding his 1912 oil on canvas, Le Poulailler ("The Henhouse"), José Ortega y Gasset said that Regoyos "seemed to kneel to paint a cabbage". He also painted several smoking locomotive paintings. In 1883, he accompanied several painters on a tour of Spain, settling in the country the following year. He married in Spain in 1895, but continued to make multiple trips out of the country.

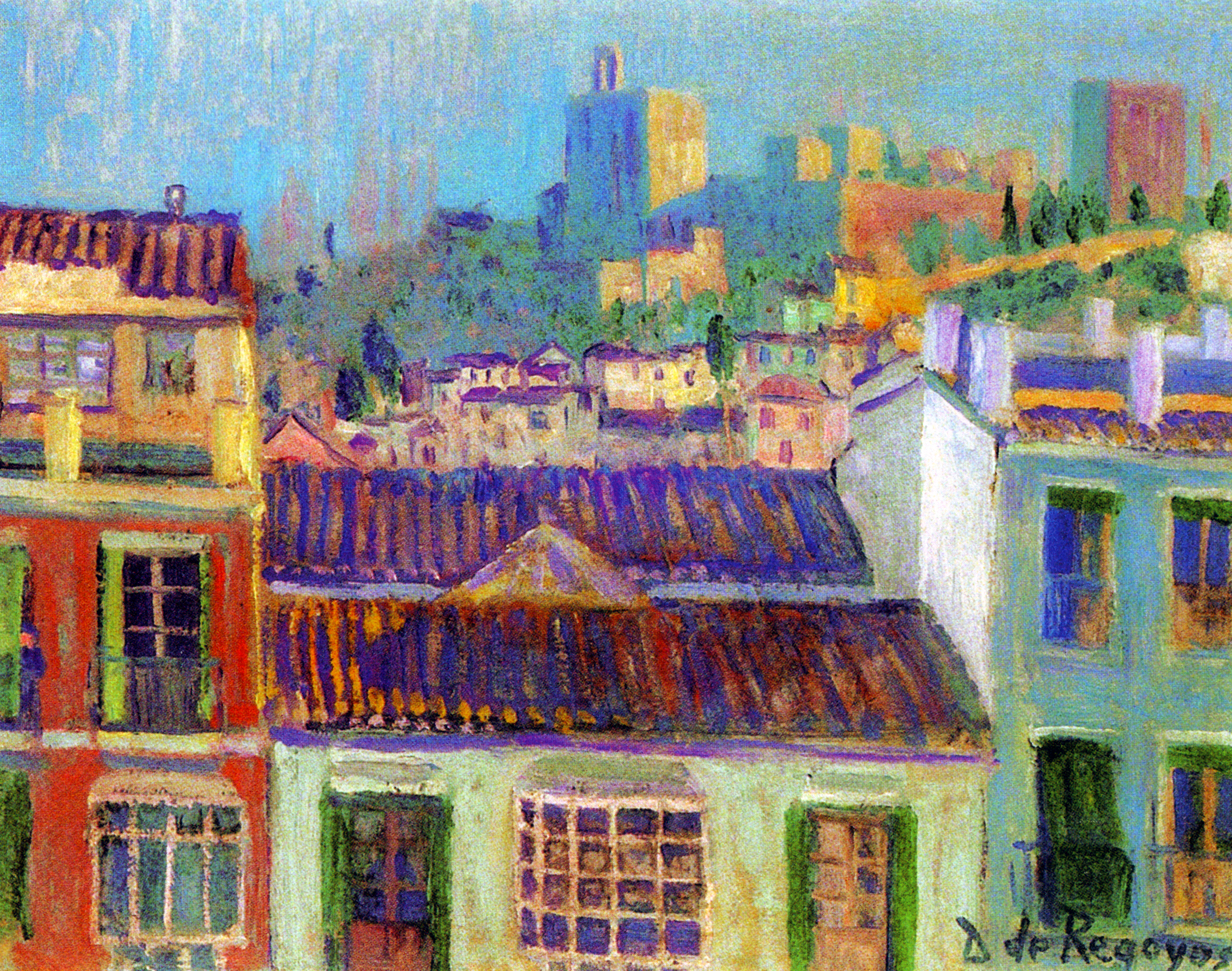
View of the Alhambra

Regoyos died of cancer in Barcelona in 1913. Though his work was not very popular during his lifetime, after his death, a tribute exhibition was devoted to him in the Biblioteca Nacional de España in Madrid. Collections of his art are held by the Bilbao Fine Arts Museum, the Museu Nacional d'Art de Catalunya in Barcelona, Abelló Museum in Vallès Oriental, and the Carmen Thyssen Museum in Málaga. There are streets in Oviedo, Ribadesella, Bilbao, Irun, Azuqueca de Henares, and Cabezon de Pisuerga honoring his name. In 2008, a €0,43 stamp was issued in Spain with his self-portrait.

== Style ==
In his early stage, Regoyos' painting evolved from Naturalism to pre-symbolism, an example being his series The black Spain, to Impressionism and Pointillism, being somewhat more daring than Ignacio Zuloaga and Joaquín Sorolla. In his mature stage, he created abundant landscapes en plein air of locations of Vizcaya and Guipúzcoa. His drawing was characterized as being somewhat primary, almost naive, in contrast to his colorful international taste, which was then largely unrivaled in Spain. Notable for contributing to "the renewal of modern Spanish painting", in Spain, he is best known for his introduction of Impressionism techniques.

== Gallery ==
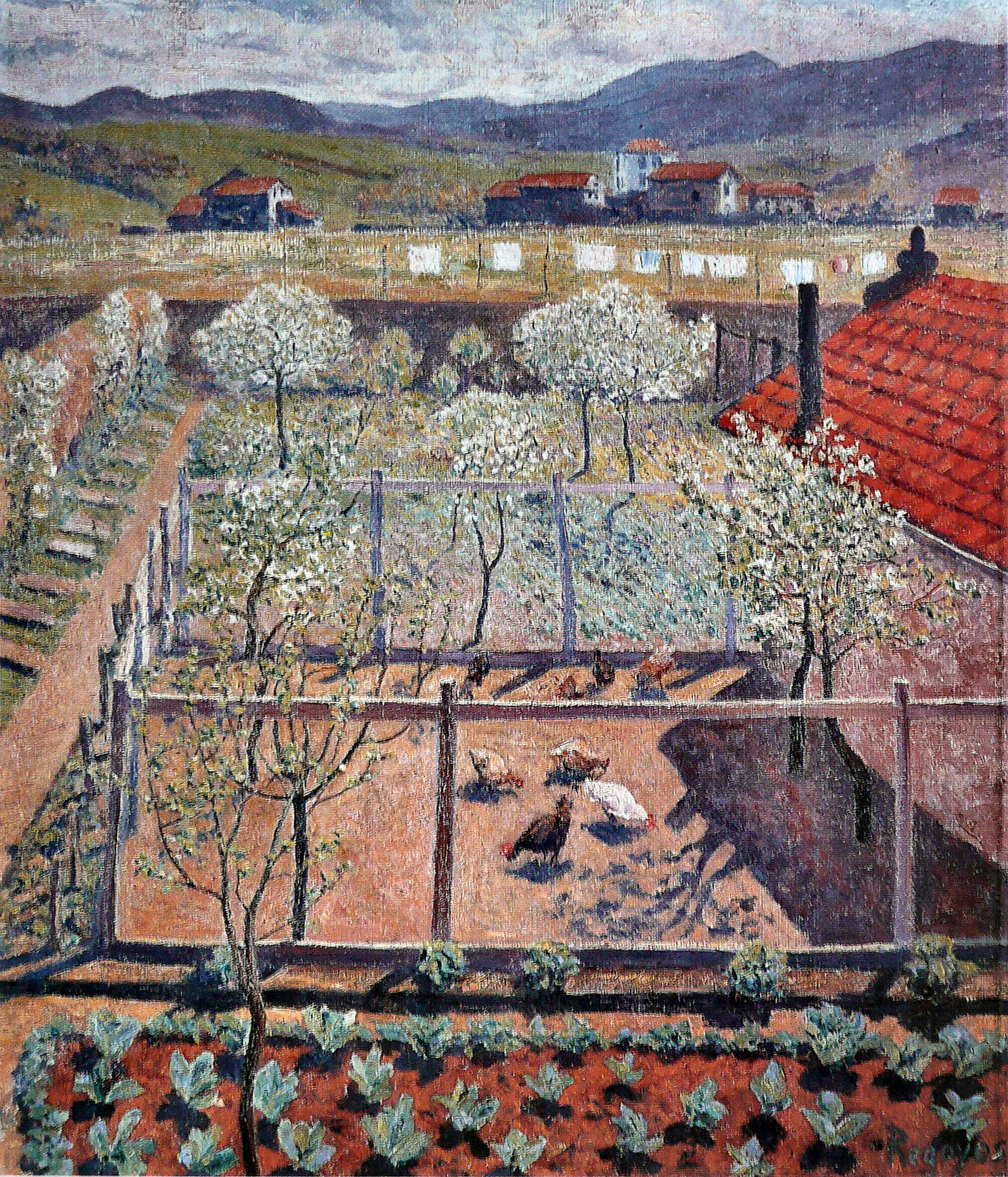
The Henhouse (1912)

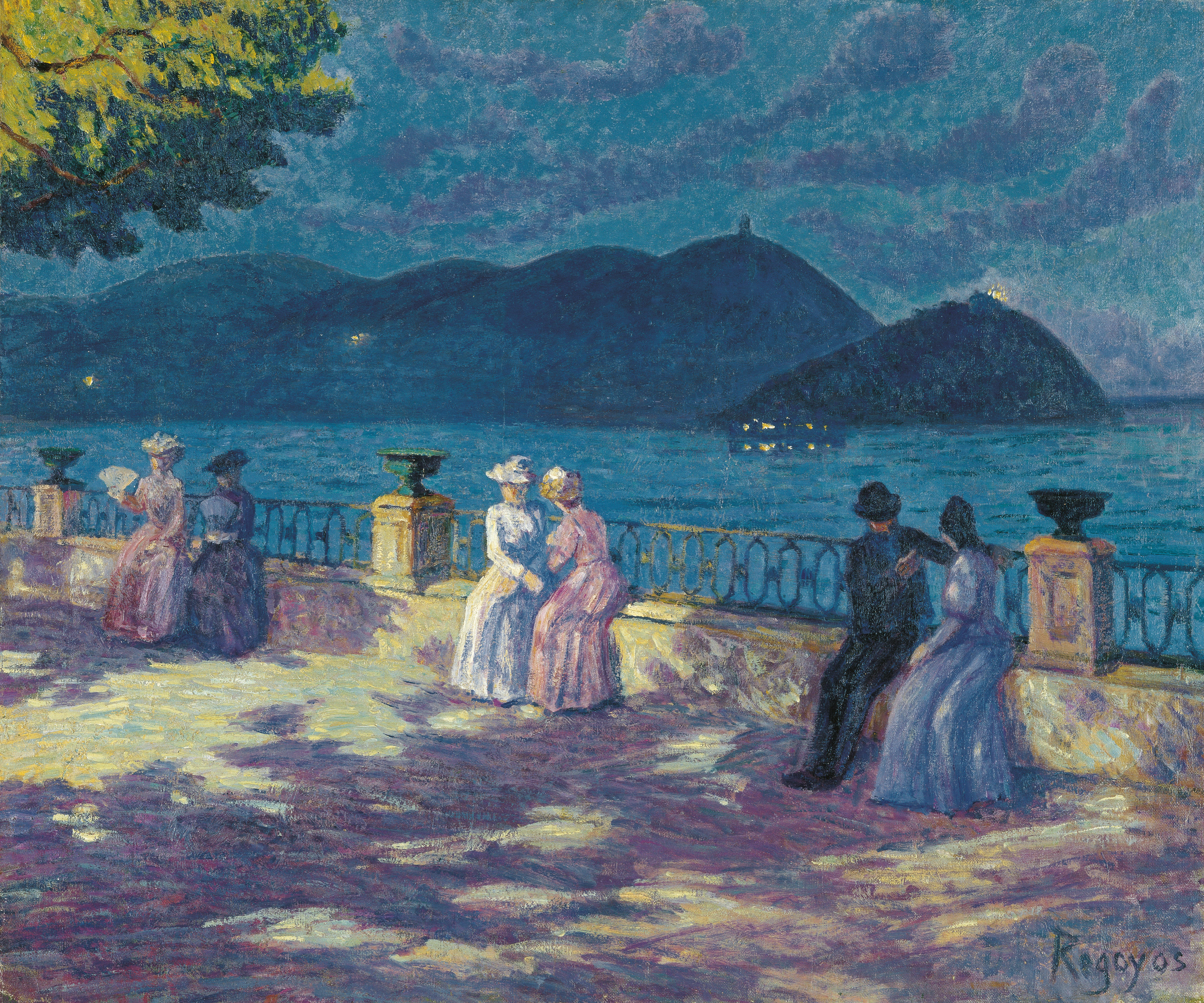
La Concha, nocturno ('La Concha at night") (c. 1905)

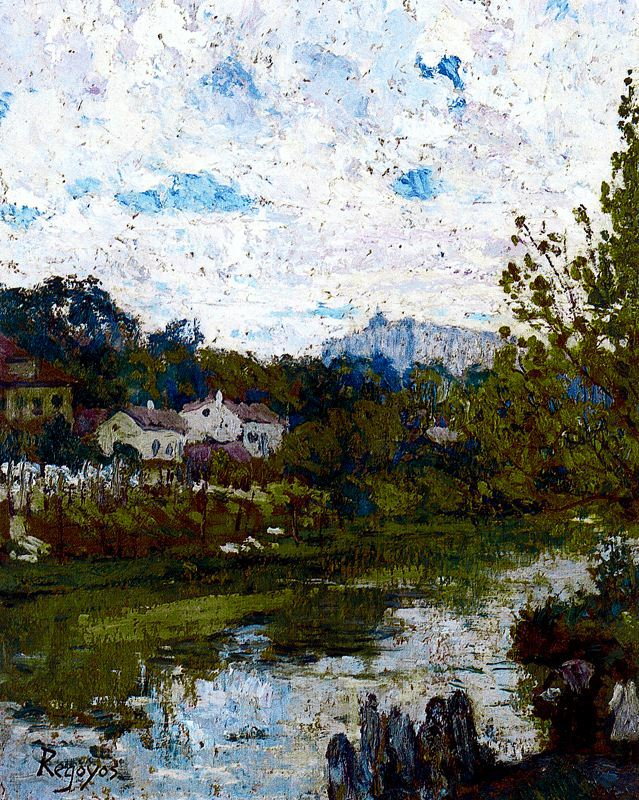
Rivera del Manzaneres (c. 1909)

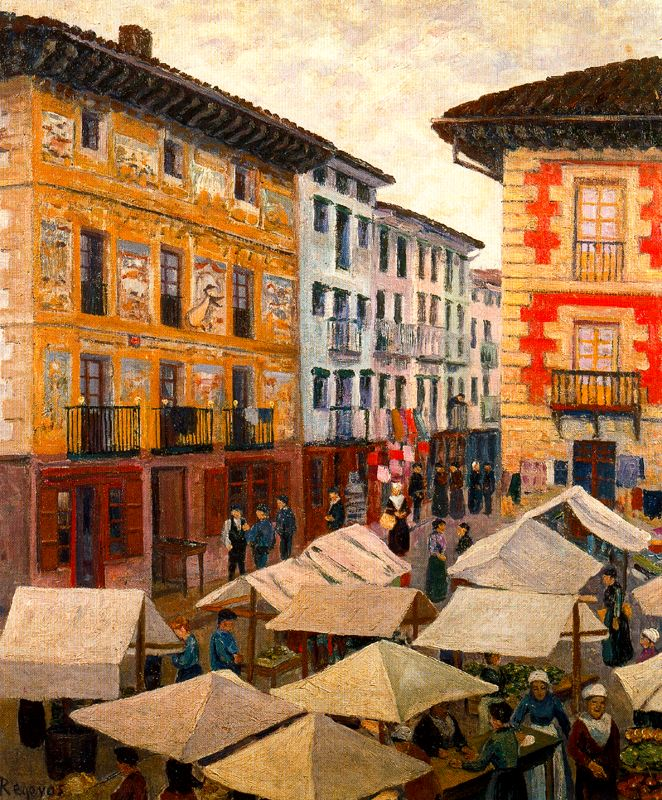
Mercado de Villafranca de Oria (1909)

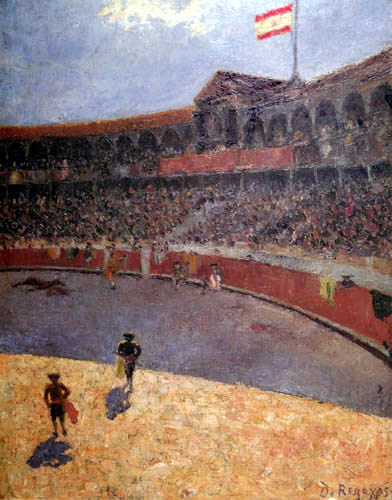
Tendido de sombra ("Pulling shadow") (1882)

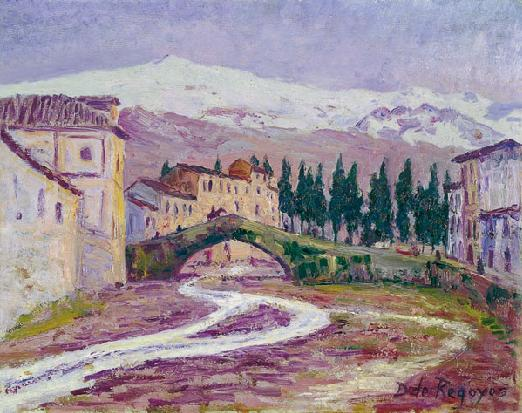
Sierra Nevada

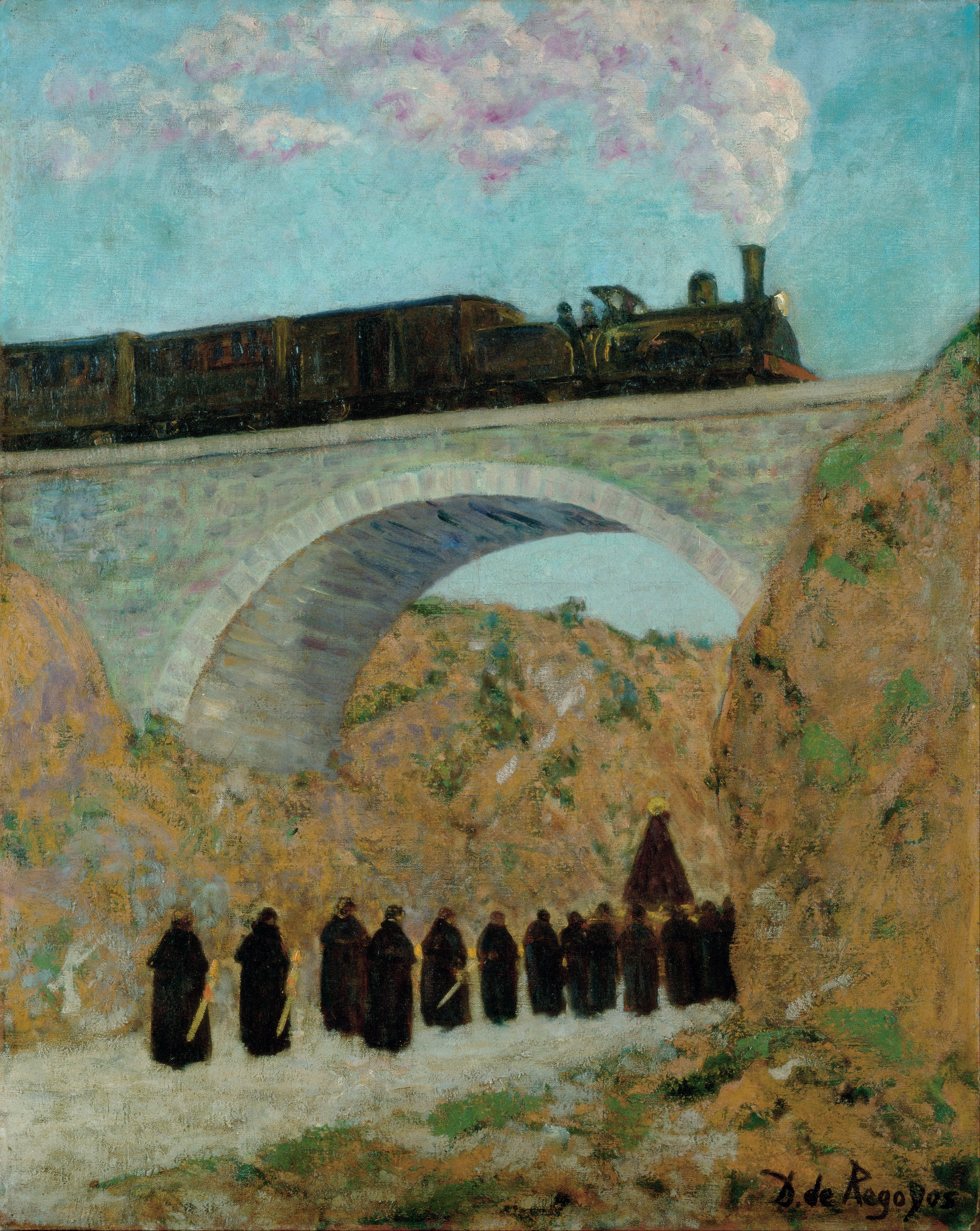
Vendredi Saint en Castille ("Good Friday in Castile")

== See also ==
- List of artists from the MNAC collection
