= Domingo Álvarez Enciso =

Spanish painter (1737–1800)

Don Domingo Álvarez Enciso (1737 – 23 October 1800), also called Domingo Alvarez and Domingo Alvarezenciso, was a Spanish painter and copyist, active in Madrid and Rome in the second half of the 18th century.

== Life ==
The origins of Domingo Álvarez Enciso are unclear. He was apparently born in 1737 in the town of Mansilla, Burgos, or in Mansilla de la Sierra. However, records related to his stay in Rome in 1758 reveal that he considered himself a native of the Riojan town of Ventosa.

From 1752 he studied painting at the Real Academia de Bellas Artes de San Fernando in Madrid, and in 1758 he won a scholarship competition that allowed him to visit Rome, with the support of Preciado de la Vega. He sent back to Madrid copies of the Rape of the Sabine Women, by Pietro da Cortona (formerly attributed to Guido Reni) and a Tarquinio y Lucrecia ('Tarquinius and Lucretia').

In 1766 he was made a supernumerary member of the Academia de San Fernando in recognition of the picture Diana y Endimion ('Diana and Endymion').

After a short stay in Madrid, he travelled again to Rome. Commissioned by Charles III, he painted copies of works by Raphael and others from the Vatican collections.

In 1788 he was appointed director of painting at the Escuela de Nobles Artes in Cádiz. In 1795 he was made an honorary member the Accademia di San Luca in Rome. He died in Jérez de la Frontera on 23 October 1800.

== List of works ==
Image	Title	Date	Dimensions	Collection
	The Rape of the Sabines (Spanish: El rapto de las Sabinas)	18th century	185 x 285 cm	Real Academia de Bellas Artes de San Fernando (Madrid)
	Tarquinius and Lucretia (Spanish: Tarquinio y Lucrecia)	18th century	170 x 128 cm	Real Academia de Bellas Artes de San Fernando (Madrid)
	Endymion and the Moon (Spanish: Endimión y la Luna)	second half of the 18th century	137 x 101 cm	Real Academia de Bellas Artes de San Fernando (Madrid)
	Aurora (Spanish: La Aurora)	18th century	100 x 200 cm (77 x 137 cm)	Real Academia de Bellas Artes de San Fernando (Madrid)
	The Fire in the Borgo (Spanish: El incendio del Borgo)	18th century	62 x 88 cm	Real Academia de Bellas Artes de San Fernando (Madrid)
	The Expulsion of Heliodorus from the Temple (Spanish: Heliodoro expulsado del templo)	18th century	63 x 89 cm	Real Academia de Bellas Artes de San Fernando (Madrid)
	Disputation of the Holy Sacrament (Spanish: La disputa del Sacramento)	18th century	63 x 89 cm	Real Academia de Bellas Artes de San Fernando (Madrid)
	The School of Athens (Spanish: La escuela de Atenas)	18th century	62 x 88 cm	Real Academia de Bellas Artes de San Fernando (Madrid)
	The Transfiguration (Spanish: La escuela de Atenas)	18th century	233 x 162 cm	Real Academia de Bellas Artes de San Fernando (Madrid)
	Saint Michael the Archangel (Spanish: San Miguel Arcangel)	18th century	136 x 99 cm	Real Academia de Bellas Artes de San Fernando (Madrid)
	Pedro Ansúrez and Alfonso I the Battler (Spanish: Pedro Ansúrez y Alfonso I el Batallador)	1758	104 x 125 cm	Real Academia de Bellas Artes de San Fernando (Madrid)
	Martyrdom of Saint Stephen (Spanish: Martirio de San Esteban)	1763		Real Academia de Bellas Artes de San Fernando (Madrid)
	The Supper at Emmaus (Spanish: La cena de Emaús)	1795	124 x 64 cm	Real Academia de Bellas Artes de San Fernando (Madrid)

== Bibliography ==
- Ossorio y Bernard, Manuel (1868). "Álvarez Enciso (D. Domingo)". Galería biográfica de artistas españoles del siglo XIX. Vol. 1. Madrid: Ramón Moreno. pp. 24–25.
