= Carlos de Haes =

Spanish painter from Belgium

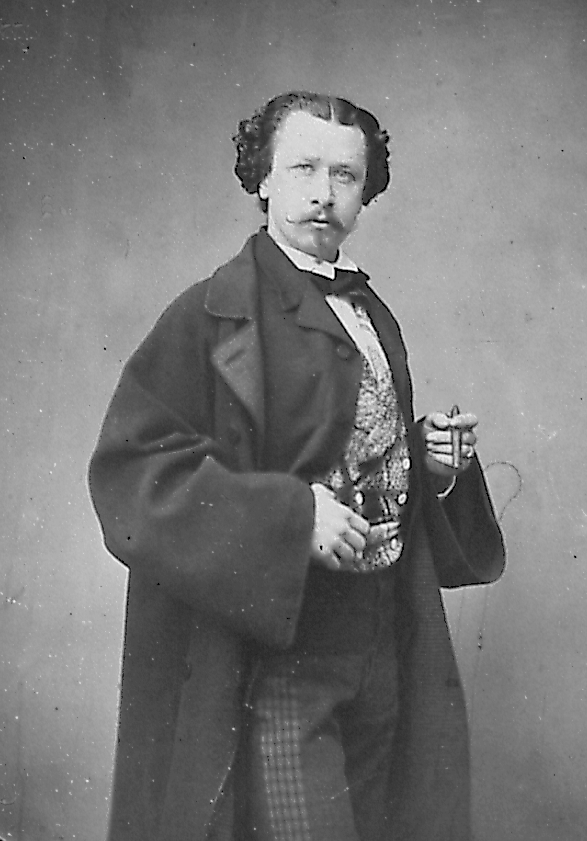
- Born: January 25, 1829; Belgium
- Died: June 17, 1898 (aged 69)
- Known for: Painting
- Notable work: Monasterio de Piedra
- Movement: Realism

Carlos Sebastián Pedro Hubert de Haes (January 25, 1829 – June 17, 1898) was a Spanish painter from Belgium. He was noted for the Realism in his landscapes, and was considered to be the "first contemporary Spanish artist able to capture something of a particularly Spanish 'essence' in his work". He was cited along with Jenaro Perez Villaamil and Aureliano de Beruete as one of the three Spanish grand masters of landscape painting, the latter of which was his pupil.

In the 1850s, Haes was involved in the rise of the Realist school of landscape. Coincidentally his landscape and wildlife paintings of the Monasterio de Piedra occurred at the time of an academic opening for the Painting School of the Real Academia de Bellas Artes de San Fernando, the selection to be made by a landscape competition. In 1857 he became the first professor of landscape painting, the first in Spain to teach painting directly from nature. In 1860, he became an Academic at the Royal Academy. In 1876, he presented at the National Exhibition with La Canal de Mancorbo en los Picos de Europa ("The Canal of Mancorbo in the Picos de Europa") later acquired by the Spanish state to be part of the collection of the Museo del Prado, because of its significance as a realistic Spanish landscape painting.

== Early years ==
Haes was born in Brussels to a family of bankers. The family moved to Spain, settling in Málaga in 1835, where Haes studied with the Neoclassical portrait painter Luis de la Cruz y Ríos. In 1850, Haes decided to continue his art training by studying with the great Flemish landscape masters. His encounter with Joseph Quinaux, who mentored Haes from 1850 through 1855, influenced his painting outdoors, and defined his artistic works as a whole. In Brussels, he came in contact with other notable European painters at the annual exhibition of the Brussels Salon. He traveled throughout Holland, France, and Germany.

== Career ==
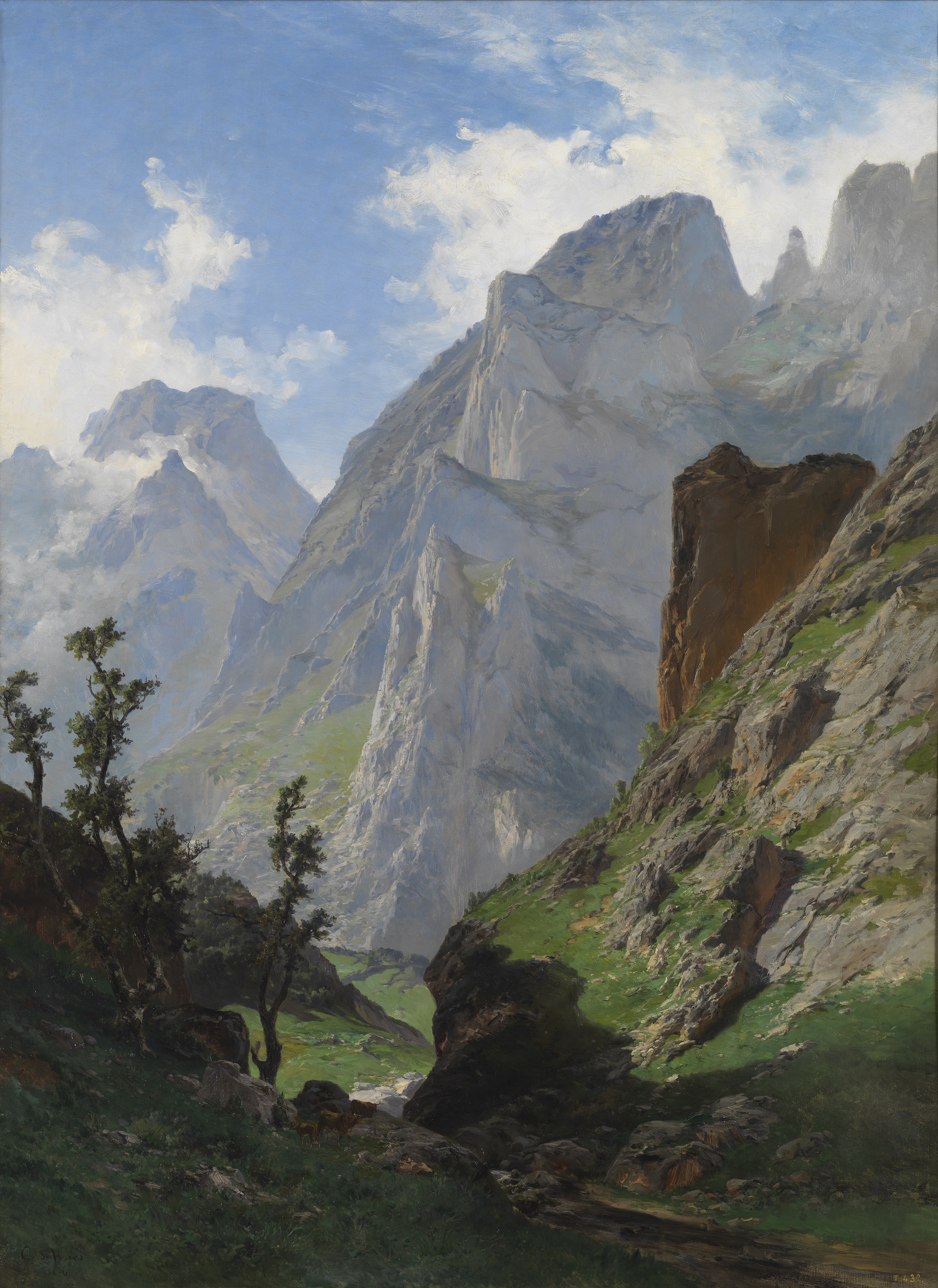
La canal de Mancorbo en los Picos de Europa ("The Canal of Mancorbo in the Picos de Europa"), 1876, by Carlos de Haes (Museo de Prado).

After returning to Spain, he entered the National Exhibition of Fine Arts, winning a third place medal for landscapes created around Brussels. Haes was involved in the 1850s rise of the Realist school of landscape. It was coincidental that Haes' landscape and wildlife paintings of the Monasterio de Piedra occurred at the time of an academic opening for the Painting School of the Real Academia de Bellas Artes de San Fernando, the selection to be made by a landscape competition. He received the academic appointment in 1857, becoming professor of landscape painting, and becoming the first in Spain to teach painting directly from nature. Among his students were Jaime Morera, Aureliano de Beruete, and Darío de Regoyos. Haes took his students with him to paint in the countryside; under his teaching the "painters proliferated and took advantage of the new railway system to explore the furthest corners of the nation's topography." He influenced the Spanish novelist, Azorín, who perfected his writing technique by repeatedly viewing Haes' works at the museum.

In addition to teaching, he continued his painting production, and in 1858, Haes received the first medal at the National Exhibition. In 1860, he became an Academic at the Royal Academy, and received a medal for his Memories of Andalusia. In 1862, he medaled with his landscape, Vista del Lozoya. In 1876, he again presented at the National Exhibition with La Canal de Mancorbo en los Picos de Europa ("The Canal of Mancorbo in the Picos de Europa"); its preparatory sketch was dated in situ in 1874. Though it did not win a prize, it was acquired by the Spanish state to be part of the collection of the Museo del Prado, because of its significance as a realistic Spanish landscape painting. He became ill in 1890 and died in Madrid in 1898.

== Style ==
Following the ideals of an academic, Haes believed that the end result of art should be the truth found in the imitation of nature, the source of all beauty. The painter should imitate nature as closely as possible, and to do so, you must know nature and not rely on imagination. Leaving behind Romanticism, he was early to embrace the En plein air style, working from outdoor preparatory sketches which were completed within a workshop. In terms of technique, his strokes have Impressionists connotations, though he lacks the treatment of light and color, and moves away from the spontaneity and immediacy of this art movement. Towards the end of his career, he developed a looser and more direct style associated with the Barbizon school. The best of his extensive work (four thousand pictures and notes) can be seen in the Carmen Thyssen Museum in Málaga, the Lleida Museum, and the Museo del Prado, which received 183 works of Haes which were donated by the Museum of Modern Art. His work has been documented by the likes of Rubén Darío.

== See also ==
- List of artists from the MNAC collection

== Gallery ==
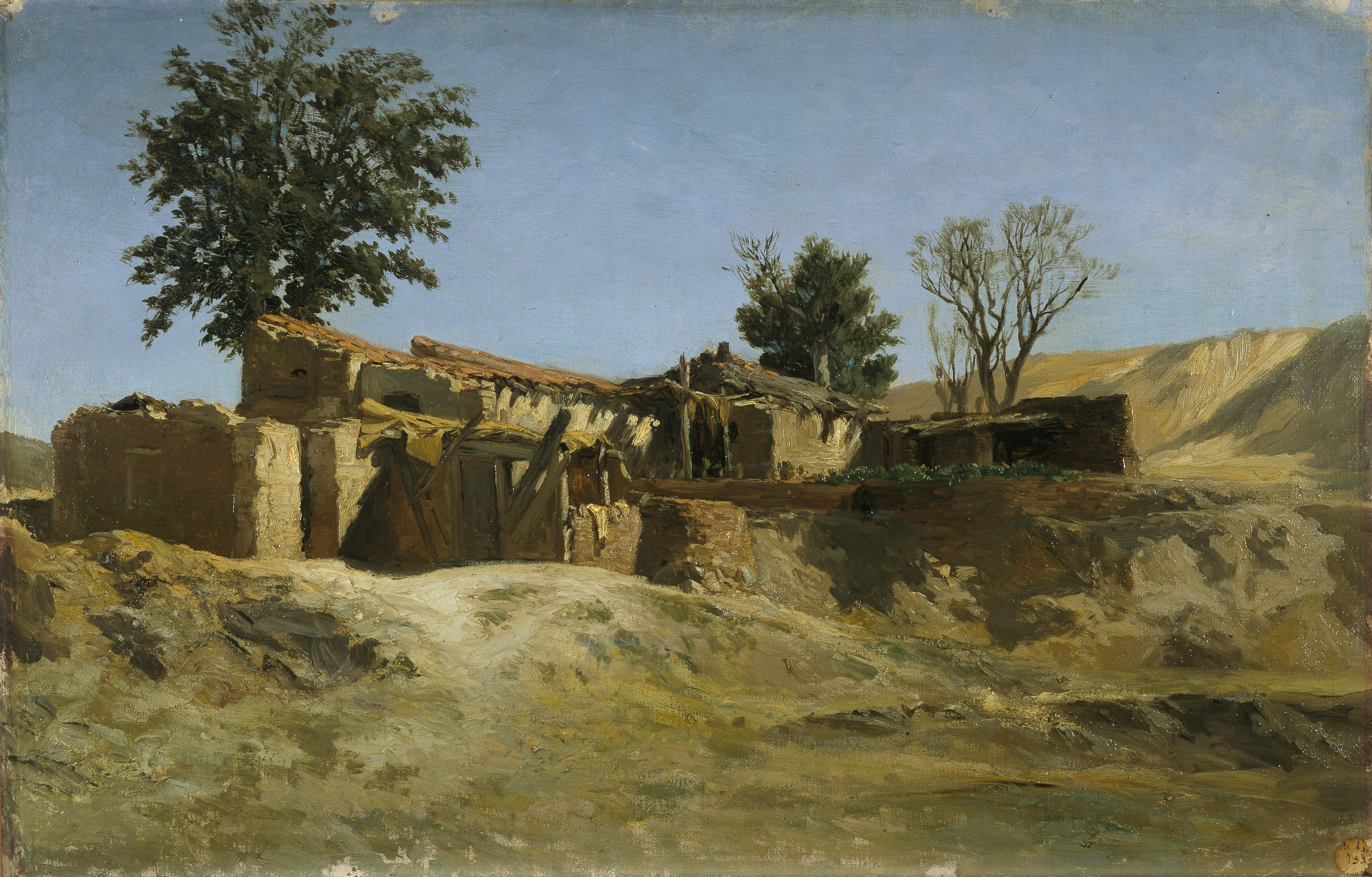
Tileworks in the Principe Pio Mountains

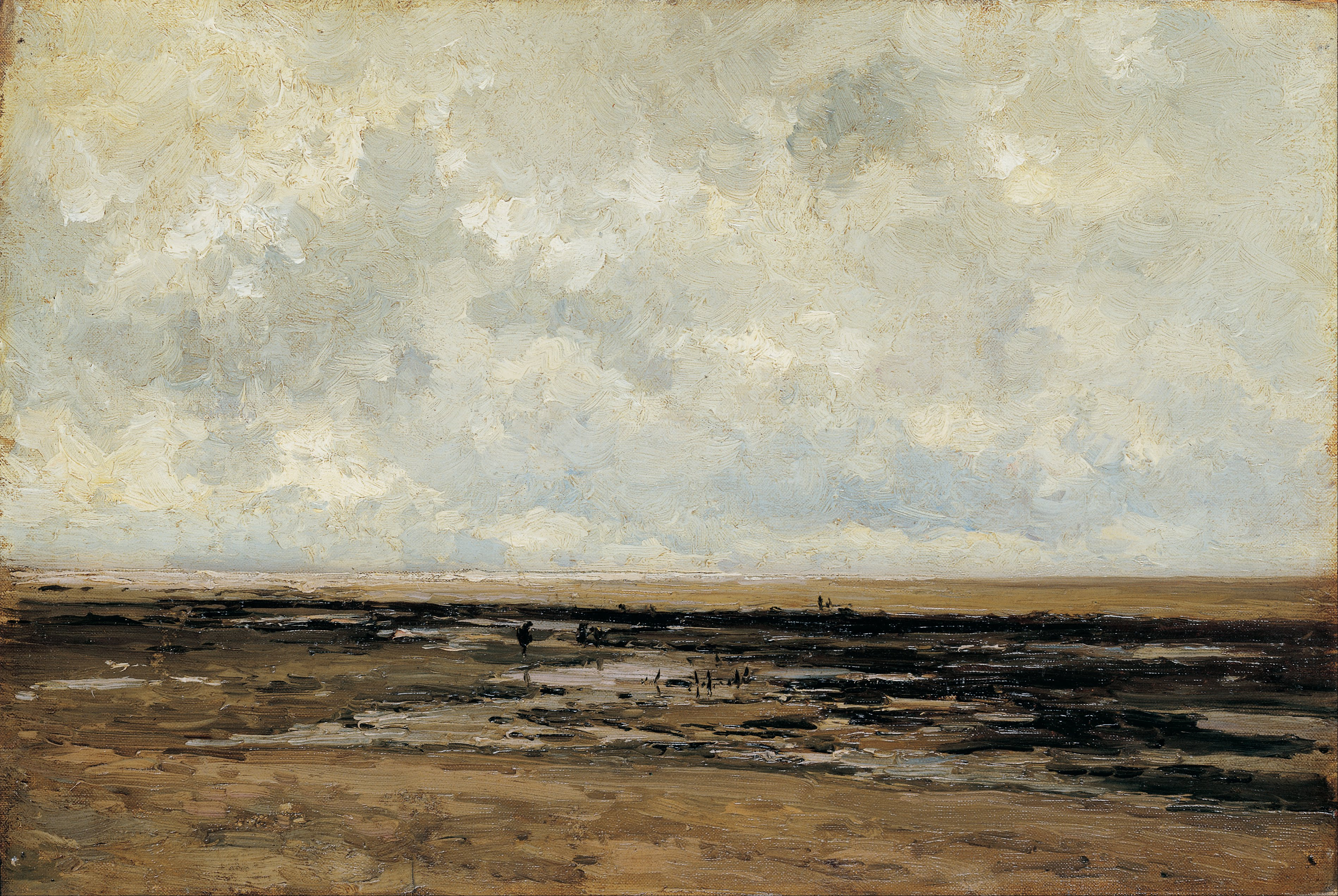
Villerville Beach, Normandy

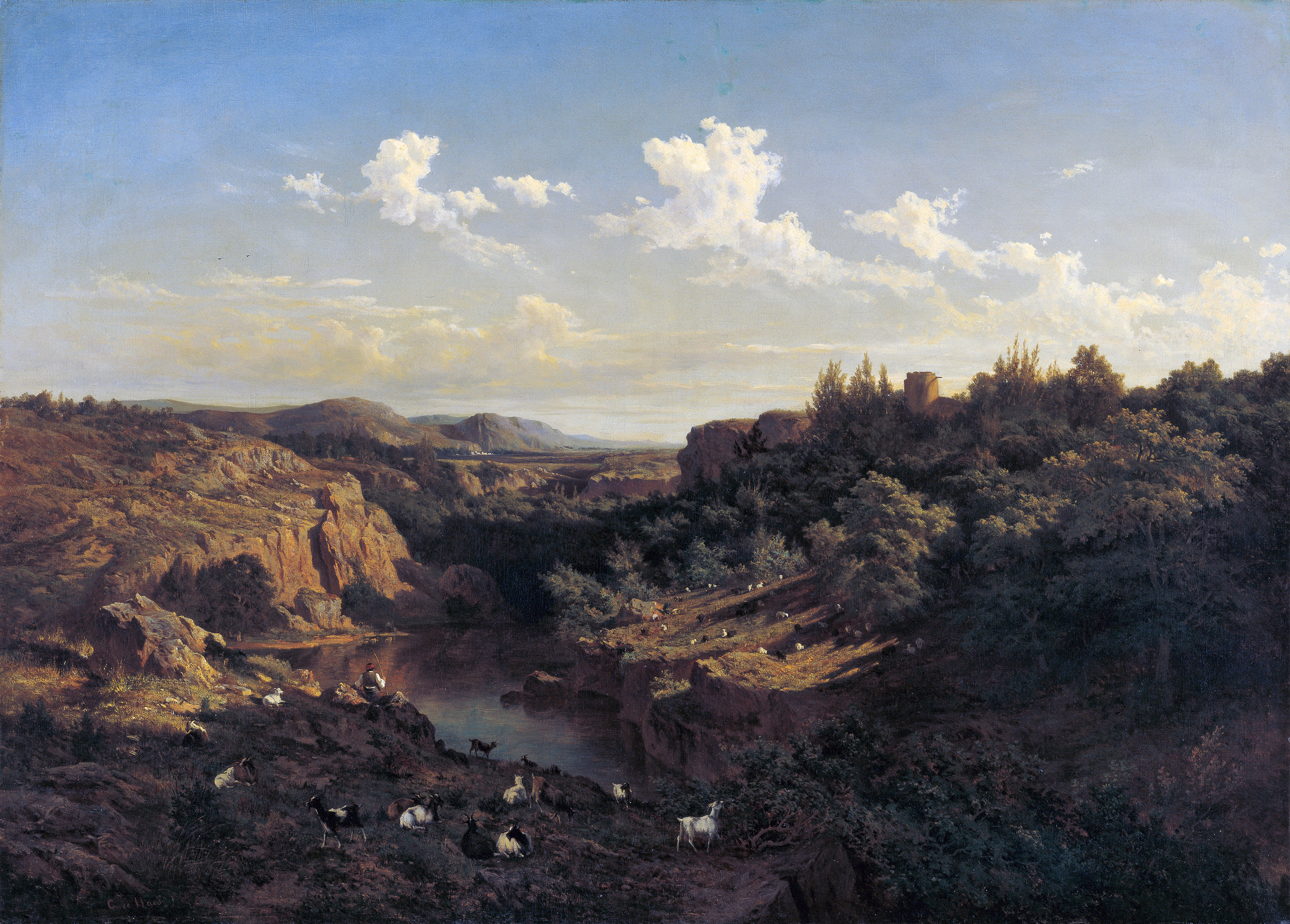
View near Monasterio de Piedra

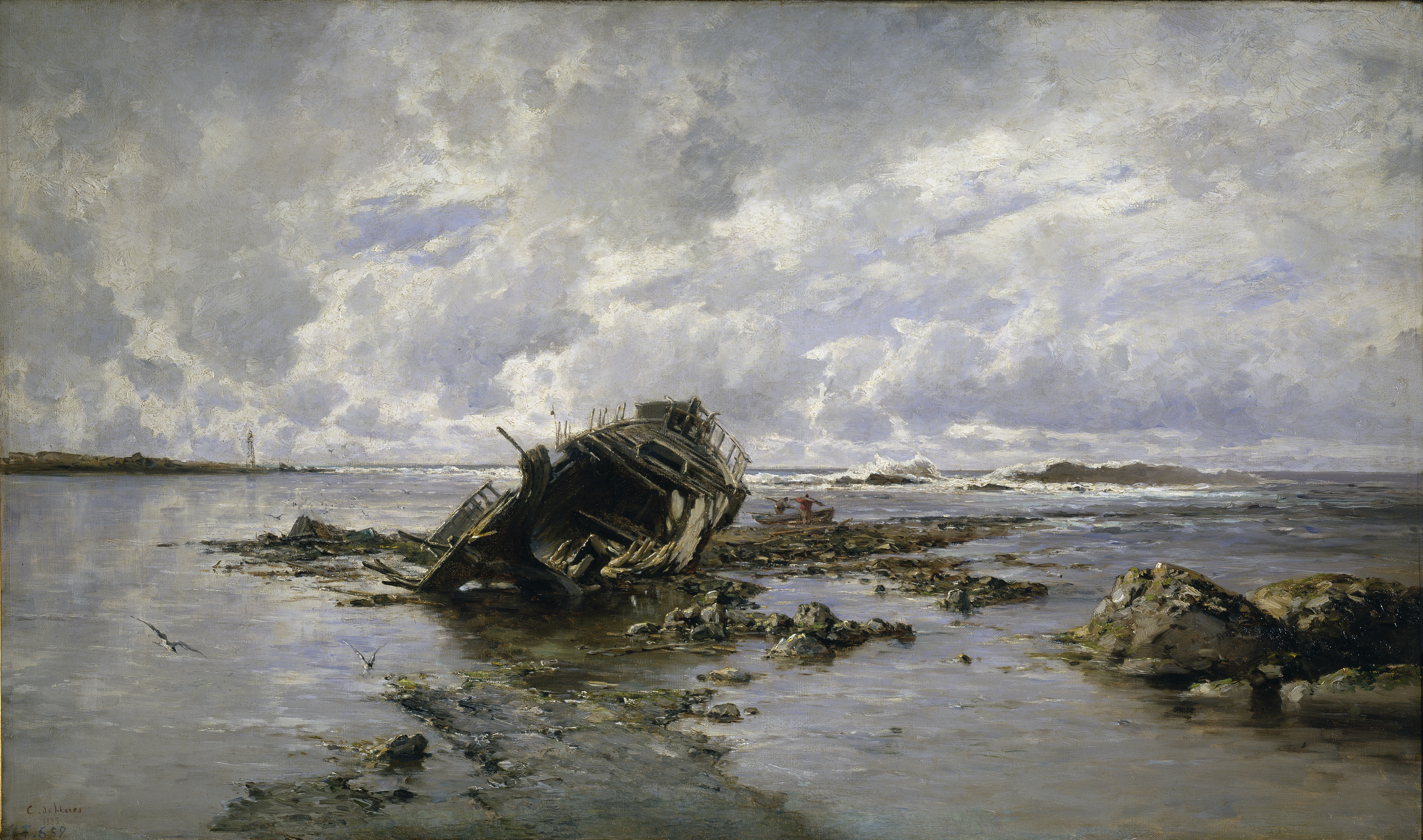
Un barco naufragado

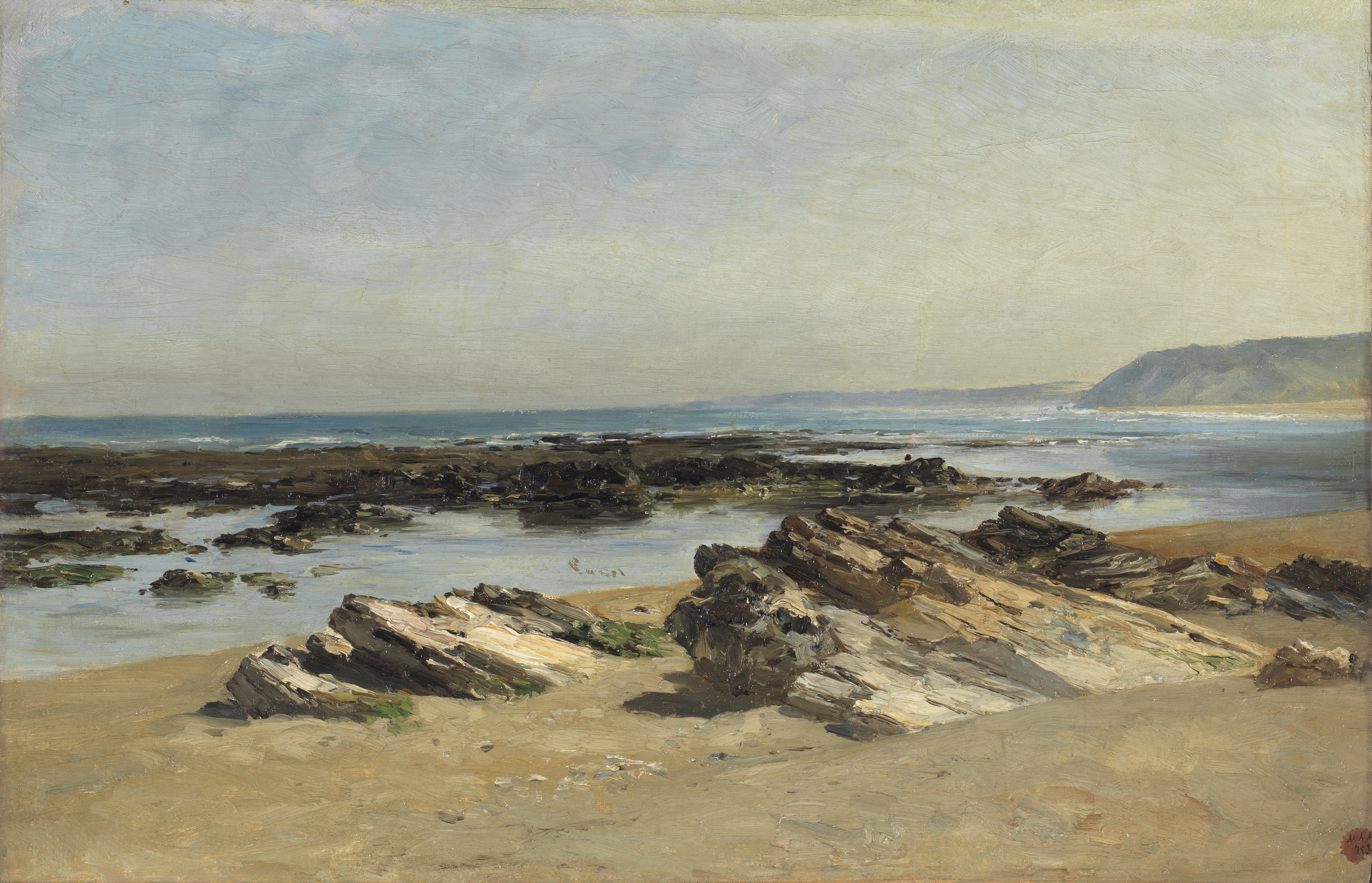
Bajamar en Guetaria

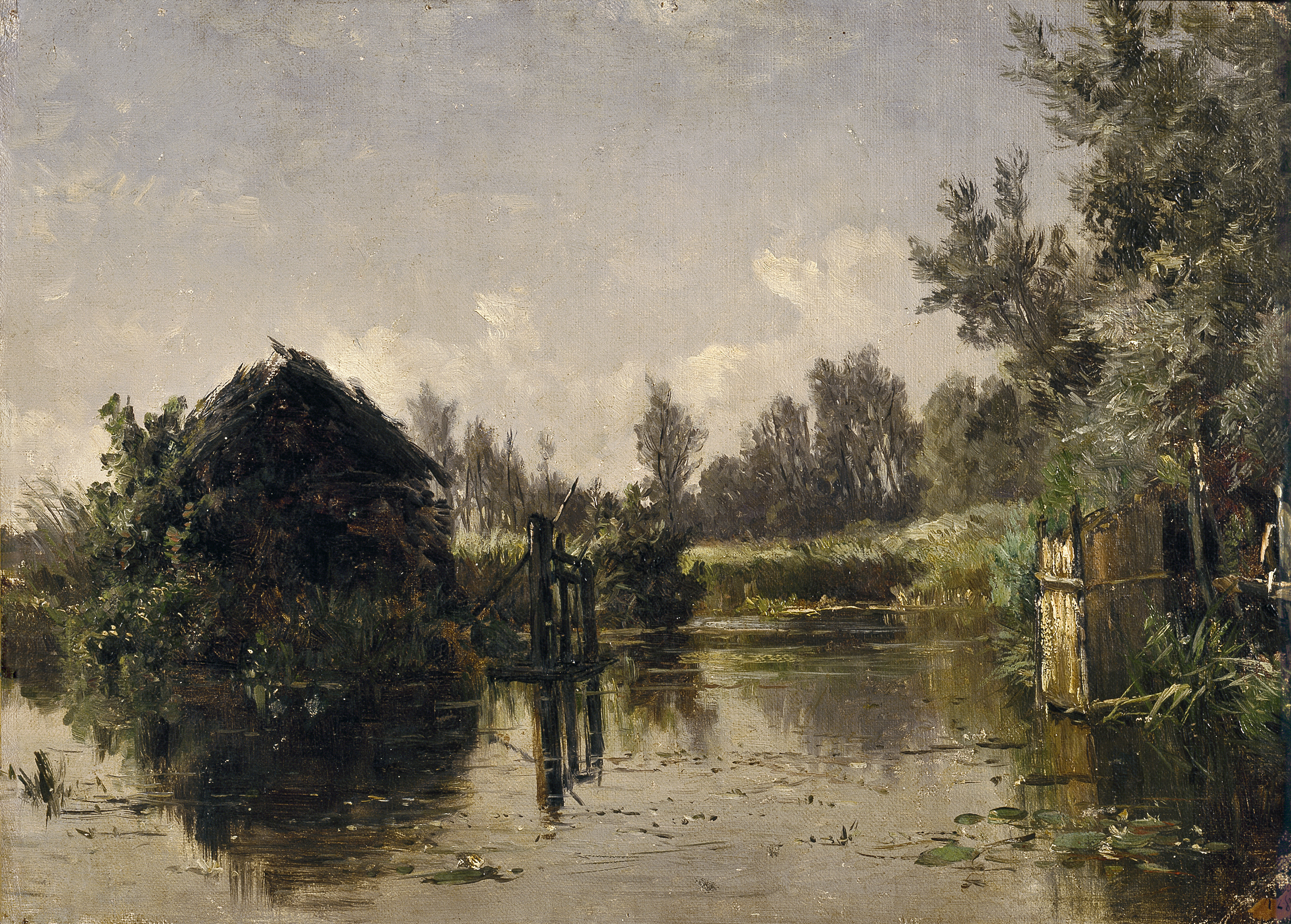
Canal abandonado. Vriesland
