= Pere Moragues =

Catalan sculptor and goldsmith

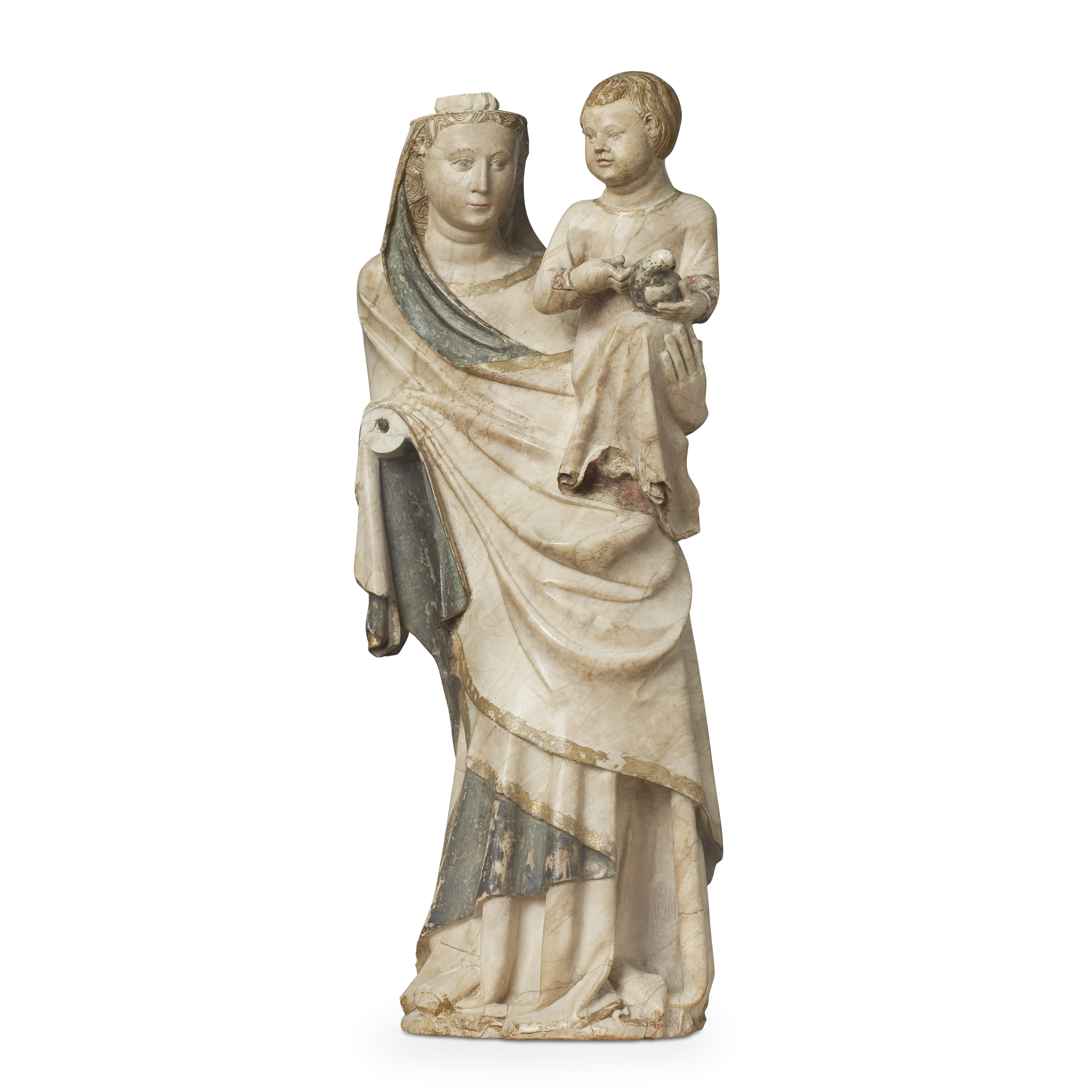
Virgin and Child by Pere Moragues, Museu Frederic Marès collection.

Pere Moragues (c. 1330-1388) was a Catalan sculptor and goldsmith active in the second half of the 14th century. He was active in Barcelona, and "made the statues for the royal mausoleums at Poblet, and had executed other commissions for the Aragonese crown."

One of his most famous works is silver tabernacle at the Colegiata de los Corporales de Daroca executed in Zaragoza in 1386.

== Scientific study of his works ==
Scientific testing was done on one of his works, the Recumbent Cleric in the Museu Catalunya (Museum stock #9923 Image of the sculpture at the Google Cultural Institute) to see if the provenance of the alabaster could be determined. When the isotopic signatures of the oxygen and sulphur of this alabaster piece are compared with those of the geological raw materials of it and similar items, there is accordance, in general, with the historical documentation. Most of the items tested with unknown provenances were consistent with a Tertiary marine origin.

== Locations of his works ==
The Museu Frederic Marès holds some of his sculptures. The Museu describes him as "one of the most highly esteemed artists of the Gothic era within the Crown of Aragon".
