= Rape of the Sabines (Pietro da Cortona) =

Paintings by Pietro da Cortona

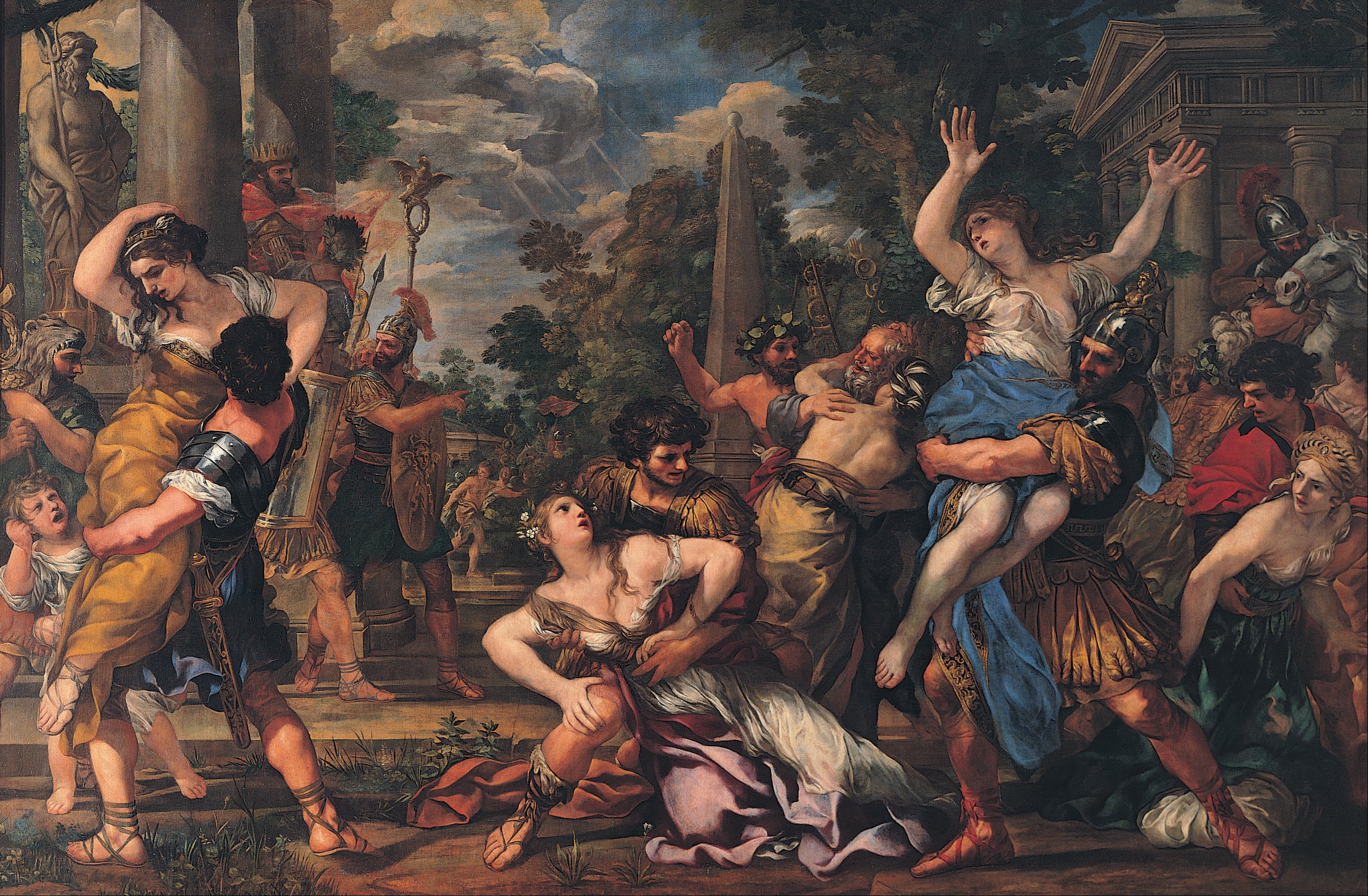
Capitol picture, c. 1630 (280 x 426 cm)

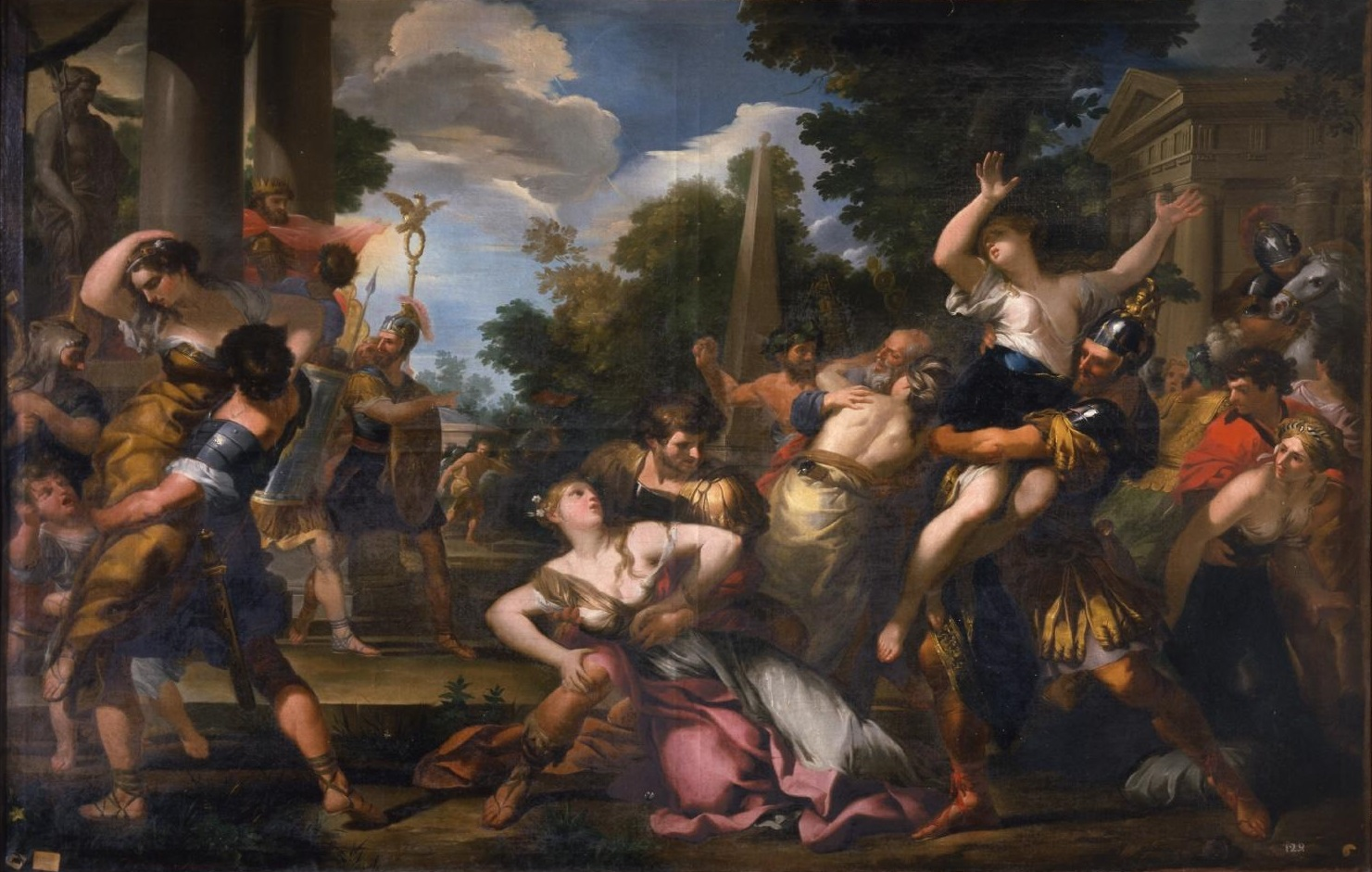
Copy by Domingo Álvarez Enciso (Real Academia de Bellas Artes de San Fernando)

Rape of the Sabines (Italian: Ratto delle Sabine) may refer to either of two oil paintings by the Italian Baroque artist Pietro da Cortona, created c. 1629-1630. One is in the Capitoline Museums, Rome. The other is listed in 19th century catalogues of the art collection at Blenheim Palace, Oxfordshire. Both pictures depict the legendary rape of the Sabine women. (Note: The story is told by Livy and Plutarch. Romulus, his people having been refused the right of connubium or legal marriage by the Sabines and the Latins, instituted games in honour of the god Consus and invited his neighbours with their wives and children to the festival. When they were assembled, the Roman youths seized and carried off the virgins and made them their wives. This led to war, and both parties were nearly exhausted with the struggle when the Sabine women rushed in among the combatants and brought about a reconciliation between their husbands and their fathers.)

== Capitol picture ==
At right, a woman in a soldier's embrace, raises her hands in supplication; at left, another, borne away by a Roman, looks pityingly at her infant, who cries and seeks to follow her; in middle, a third energetically resists her aggressor.

Copy by J. C. Naigeon, Dijon Museum. Engraved by P. Aquila.

== Blenheim picture ==
Waagen expresses his opinion that this picture is one of the painter's best and most careful works, exhibiting unusual force of colouring and careful execution. Figures the size of life. Painted on canvas.

== Bibliography ==
- Champlin, John Denison Jr.; Perkins, Charles C., eds. (1887). Cyclopedia of Painters and Paintings. Vol. 4. New York: Charles Scribner's Sons. p. 96.
- Scharf, George (1862). Catalogue Raisonné, or a List of the Pictures in Blenheim Palace. Vol. 1. London: Dorrell & Son. p. 17.
- Waagen, Gustav Friedrich (1884). Treasures of Art in Great Britain. Vol. 3. London: John Murray. p. 126.
