= Manel Esclusa =

Manel Esclusa (born 13 April 1952, Vic, Catalonia) is a Catalan photographer and Professor of Photography at the Eina School in Barcelona and the Institute of Photographic Studies of Catalonia. Since 1979 his photographic series, Venezia, Sulla lepsis Ships, Urbs night and Aiguallum pose a reflection on the urban landscape and night scene, night exploring the reality of cities, spaces and objects from their hidden and anonymous to those architectural elements are illuminated perceived as symbols of a city.

== Awards ==
- 1985- Barcelona. LAUS/ADGFAD Award
- 1985- Barcelona. Línea d'imatge per Quaderns d'Arquitectura i Urbanisme.
- 1988- Arlés. Prix du Livre Photo for Barcelona, ciutat imaginada.
- 1988- LAUS/ADGFAD Award for Barcelona, ciutat imaginada
