= Josep Masana =

- Born: Josep Masana i Fargas; May 16, 1892; Granollers, Vallès Oriental, Spain
- Died: January 4, 1979 (aged 86); Barcelona, Spain
- Occupation: Photographer
- Known for: Pictorialist and advertising photography
- Movement: Pictorialism

Josep Masana (16 May 1892 – 4 January 1979) was a Spanish pictorialist photographer associated with the development of artistic and advertising photography in Catalonia in the first half of the twentieth century. His work combined noucentista sensibilities, pictorialist techniques and later avant‑garde approaches, earning him recognition as a versatile figure within Catalan photography.

== Biography ==
=== Early life and training ===
Josep Masana Fargas was born in Granollers, in the Province of Barcelona, on 16 May 1892. Sources on his early years are scarce, but biographical summaries indicate that he showed an early interest in photography and entered the medium at a young age. Masana’s formative years coincided with the consolidation of pictorialism in Catalonia, a movement that sought to assert photography as an art form in dialogue with painting and graphic arts. He became part of a generation that also included Joan Vilatobà, Joaquim Pla Janini and Josep Maria Casals Ariet, who collectively helped shape a specifically Catalan variant of pictorialism

=== Pictorialist work and style ===
Masana is described in the specialist literature as one of the representatives of Catalan pictorialism, noted for his versatility and for the variety of themes and visual strategies present in his work. His images frequently employed soft focus, atmospheric lighting and carefully staged compositions aligned with romantic and symbolist tendencies. Within this pictorialist context, Masana explored recurring motifs such as the female body, allegorical figures and expressive portraiture, often with a marked interest in mood and psychological suggestion. Studies of Catalan pictorialism highlight his series on biblical and literary subjects, including images of Salome that combine sensuality and dramatic symbolism.

=== Avant‑garde and applied photography ===
From the late 1920s and 1930s, Masana participated in the renewal of photography in Barcelona, engaging with avant‑garde visual languages and applied photographic practices. He is mentioned among the pioneers of advertising and industrial photography in Catalonia, alongside figures such as Josep Sala, contributing photomontages and commercial images that integrated modernist graphic design. Works like the photograph commonly titled “Radiators”, preserved at the Museu Nacional d’Art de Catalunya, exemplify his interest in formal abstraction, industrial motifs and close framing. In these images, everyday objects and technical devices are transformed into rhythmic structures, aligning his practice with broader European experiments in New Vision photography.

== Exhibitions, reception and legacy ==
Masana was active in Catalan photographic circles and participated in exhibitions that helped legitimize photography as an artistic medium, although detailed exhibition chronologies remain limited in the published record. Later assessments in catalogues and overviews of Catalan photography characterize him as a mid‑twentieth‑century “grandmaster” whose oeuvre bridges pictorialism and later modern trends.

His photographs form part of public collections, notably at the Museu Nacional d’Art de Catalunya and the Museo Reina Sofía, where they are cited in relation to the history of avant‑garde and advertising photography in Spain. Scholarly studies of pictorialism and of the body, allegory and landscape in Catalan photography frequently use Masana’s work as a case study, situating him within a broader network of artists who contributed to the artistic recognition of photography in Catalonia.

=== Selected exhibitions ===
Title	Curator(s)	Museum or gallery	Location
Josep Masana 1892–1979	Cristina Zelich; Pere Formiguera	Centre d’Art Santa Mònica	Barcelona, Spain
Josep Masana 1892–1979	Cristina Zelich; Pere Formiguera	Centre d’Études Catalanes, Université Paris-Sorbonne	Paris, France
Masana, fotògraf. Granollers 1892, Barcelona 1979		Casa de Cultura / Fundació Caixa de Pensions (exhibition series)	Granollers, Spain
Praga, París, Barcelona. La modernidad fotográfica 1918–1948	Olga Sviblova; Anne-Marie Beckmann; others (as per catalogue)	Museu Nacional d’Art de Catalunya (MNAC)	Barcelona, Spain
Josep Masana (retrospective within Primavera Fotogràfica a Catalunya 1984)		Various venues within Primavera Fotogràfica (including Barcelona)	Catalonia, Spain
Traces of Dalí (Huellas dalinianas)	Jaime Brihuega	Artium Museoa	Vitoria-Gasteiz, Spain
The Cult of Beauty	(curatorial team of CCCB; see exhibition credits)	Centre de Cultura Contemporània de Barcelona (CCCB)	Barcelona, Spain

== Selected literature ==
- Zelich, Cristina (1994). Josep Masana, 1892–1979 (in Catalan). Barcelona: Generalitat de Catalunya, Departament de Cultura. ISBN 8439328249. [
- Ribot Bayé, Cristina (2017). "Una aproximación al pictorialismo en Cataluña: cuerpo, alegoría y paisaje en la fotografía de Vilatobà, Pla Janini, Masana y Casals Ariet". Communication Papers (in Spanish). 6 (11): 67–84.
- Formiguera, Pere (1995). Fotografia catalana del nostre segle (in Catalan). Barcelona: Generalitat de Catalunya, Departament de Cultura.
- Zelich, Cristina (1995). "Josep Masana". In Zelich, Cristina (ed.). Fotografia catalana del nostre segle (in Catalan). Barcelona: Generalitat de Catalunya, Departament de Cultura.
