= Francesc Torrescassana =

Catalan landscape painter (1845–1918)

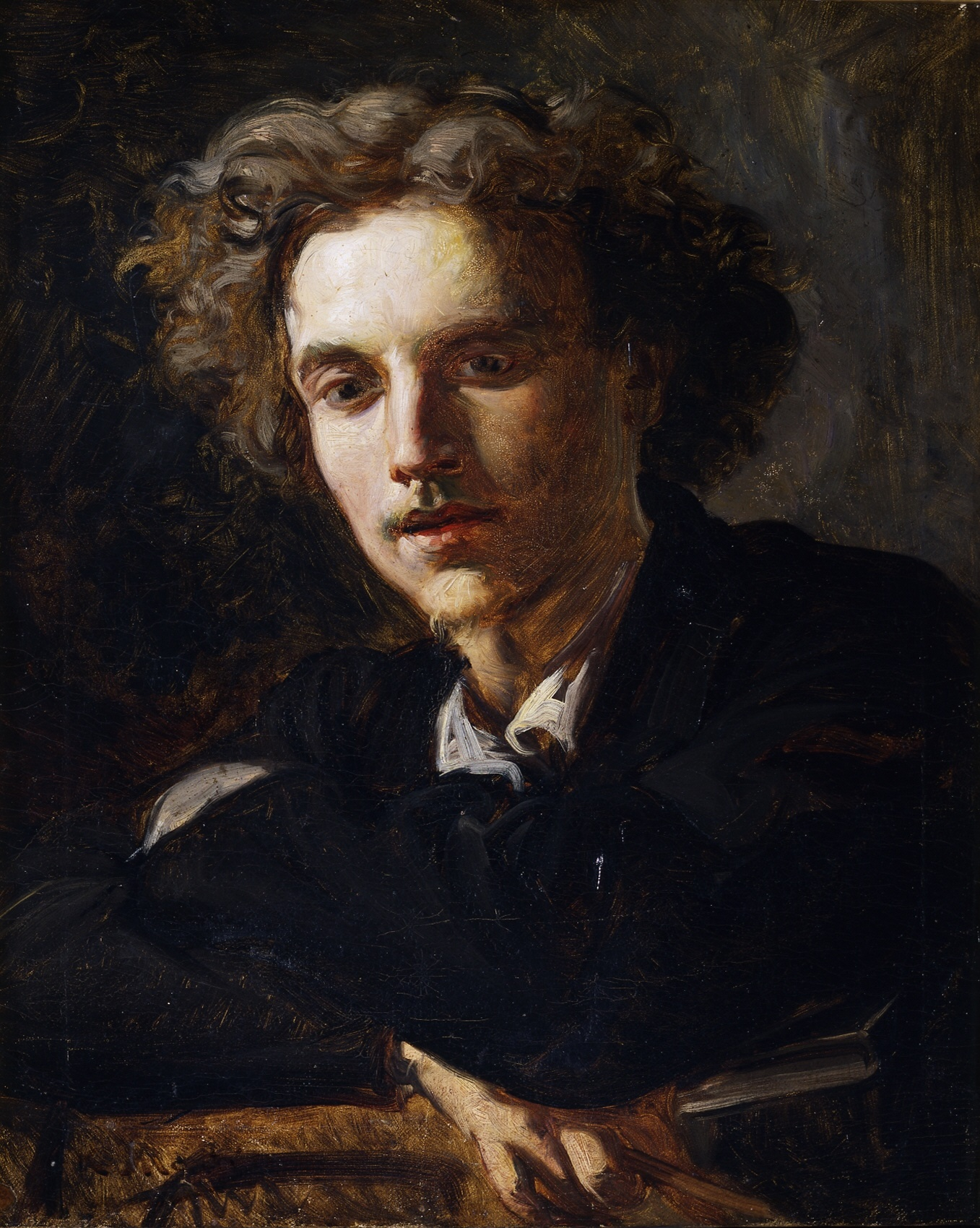
Francesc Torrescassana; portrait by Ramón Martí Alsina

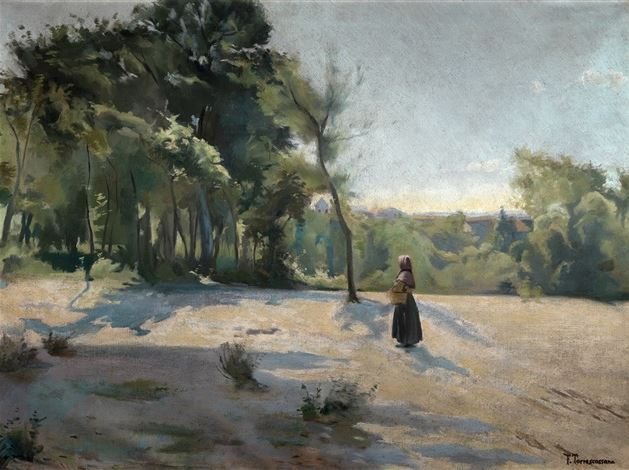
Peasant Woman in a Landscape

Francesc Torrescassana i Sallarés (1845, Barcelona – 1 March 1918, Barcelona) was a Catalan painter, primarily of landscapes.

== Biography ==
From 1859 to 1865 he attended the Escola de la Llotja in Barcelona, where he studied with Ramón Martí Alsina and had his first showing in 1864 at the National Exhibition of Fine Arts. It is not known if he received a stipend to continue his studies in Rome, but he likely went to Paris, where two of his works were presented at the Exposition Universelle in 1867. Two years later, he travelled to the Suez Canal to attend the opening ceremonies and paint the first Spanish ship to cross through.

He was a regular exhibitor at the Sala Parés and, from 1891, the Exposición General de Bellas Artes en Barcelona. Although his initial presentation was well received, the large history painting he featured at the exposition of 1894 was criticized for being overambitious and unnatural.

In 1910, he was elected vice-president of the board of directors at the Reial Cercle Artístic de Barcelona and placed in charge of organizing the Catalonian contribution to the Exposición Internacional del Centenario in Buenos Aires.

His works may be seen at MNAC, the Biblioteca Museu Víctor Balaguer, the Museu d'Art de Girona, and the collection of the Banco Sabadell. However, the largest display of his canvases, thirty-four in total, is in the dining room of the Casa Vicens and is from the personal collection of the stockbroker Manel Vicens (1836–1895).
