= Alegret =

12th-century Gascon troubadour

Alegret was a Gascon troubadour, one of the earliest lyric satirists in the Occitan tongue, and a contemporary of Marcabru (fl. c. 1145). Only one sirventes and one canso survive of his poems. Nonetheless, his reputation was high enough that he found his way into the poetry of Bernart de Ventadorn and Raimbaut d'Aurenga. The work of Alegret is also intertextually and stylistically related to that of Peire d'Alvernhe.

Alegret was also one of the first troubadours to employ the feudal metaphor to describe courtly love. He describes his relationship to his domna (lady) as that of vassalage by calling himself her endomenjatz (basically, vassal or liegeman). Pelligrini saw this passage as imitating Bernart de Ventadorn, considered the master of this metaphor:

De sol aitan mi tengr'ieu per pagatz Quel vengues, mas jontas, denan El mostres de ginolhs ploran Cum suy sieus endomenjatz,	I should be satisfied simply if I might come before her with hands joined and show her, weeping, on my knees, how I am her endomenjatz,

Marcabru parodied the structure of Alegret's Ara pareisson li'aubre sec in his own poem Bel m'es quan la rana chanta. In his typically moralising tone he accuses of Alegret of being a flatterer who cuckolds his lord. Alegret is implicitly compared to the Tristan of legend for he wears la blancha camiza (the white shirt symbolising a sexual relationship). In his own work Alegret criticses marritz drutz (faithless husbands), but primarily, like Cercamon, because they encourage promiscuity in women.

== Works in translation ==
- Aissi cum selh qu'es vencutz ("Just as the one who's beat"), translated by James H. Donalson (2005)
- Ara pareisson ll'aubre sec ("Now all the trees appear dried up"), translated by James H. Donalson (2005)

== Sources ==
- Gaunt, Simon, and Kay, Sarah. "Appendix I: Major Troubadours" (pp. 279–291). The Troubadours: An Introduction. Simon Gaunt and Sarah Kay, edd. Cambridge: Cambridge University Press, 1999. ISBN 0-521-57473-0.
- Gaunt, Simon B. "Did Marcabru Know the Tristan Legend?". Medium aevum, 55 (1986) pp. 108–113.
- Gaunt, Simon B. "Marginal men, Marcabru and orthodoxy: the early troubadours and adultery". Medium aevum, 59 (1990) pp. 55–72.
- Léglu, Catherine. "Moral and satirical poetry". The Troubadours: An Introduction. Simon Gaunt and Sarah Kay, edd. Cambridge: Cambridge University Press, 1999. ISBN 0-521-57473-0.
- Paterson, Linda M. The World of the Troubadours: Medieval Occitan Society, c. 1100–c. 1300. Cambridge: Cambridge University Press, 1993. ISBN 0-521-55832-8.
- Van Vleck, Amelia E. Memory and Re-Creation in Troubadour Lyric. Berkeley: University of California Press, 1991.
