= Robert Peters Napper =

Welsh photographer

- Born: 23 December 1818
- Died: 1867
- Occupations: Photographer, artist

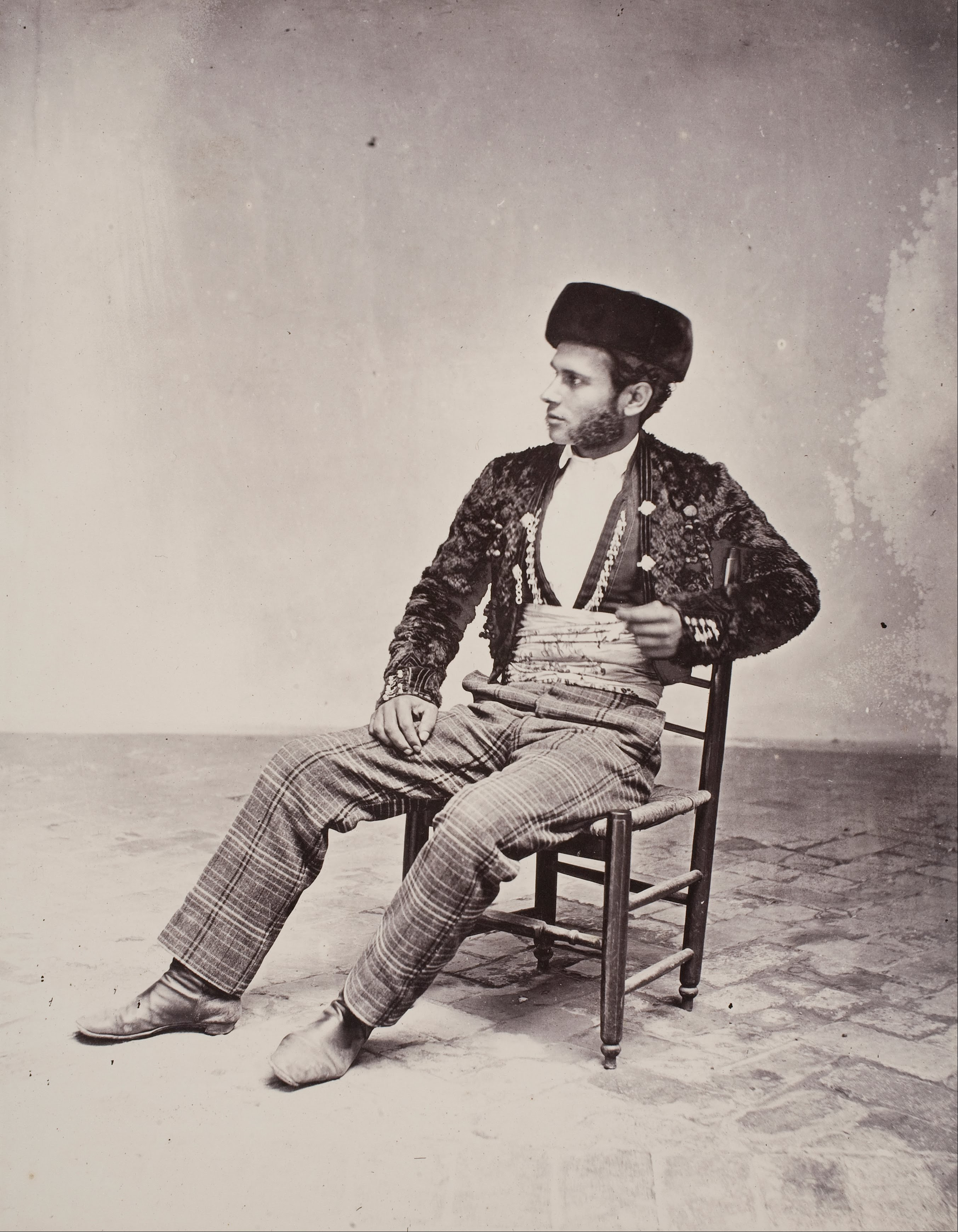
Robert Peters Napper - Seville, Gypsy boy dressed as a 'majo' - Google Art Project.jpg

Robert Peters Napper (1818–1867) was a Quaker who published albums of photographs from Andalusia, Spain and the Vale of Neath, Wales.

== Life ==
The son of Peter and Mary Napper, he was born in Newport, Wales on 23 December 1818.

He became interested in natural history and sailed for Sydney, Australia, in 1841. From there he went to collect specimens among the Aborigines around Moreton Bay, Queensland. He then moved on to business in Manila, Philippines for 12 years. In 1856 he returned to Britain via America, where he learnt about photography. He was a partner in a London photographic company, McLean, Melhuish, Napper & Co. from 1859 to 1861. He is most famous for photographs taken as an employee of Francis Frith in Spain, particularly Andalucia, in the early 1860s.

He died, after a year of illness, on 31 October 1867.

== Publications ==
- Views in Andalusia (1862), sold for '8 or 10 guineas
- Views in Wales. The Vale of Neath (by R. P. Napper. Photographed by the British and Foreign Portrait Company. With descriptive letterpress by C. H. Waring) (1864)

== Photographic works ==
e.g.

- Loja, Granada|Loja, from Views in Andalusia
- Dinas Rock, from Views in Wales
