= Juan Sánchez de Castro =

Juan Sánchez de Castro was a Spanish painter active in Seville from 1478 to 1502. His late Gothic and Hispano-Flemish style differs greatly from that of an homonymous artist, Juan Sánchez de San Román, also active in Seville during the same period.

== Works ==
His works or those of his circle can be found in the Seville Cathedral, the Museum of Fine Arts of Seville and the Museu Nacional d'Art de Catalunya.

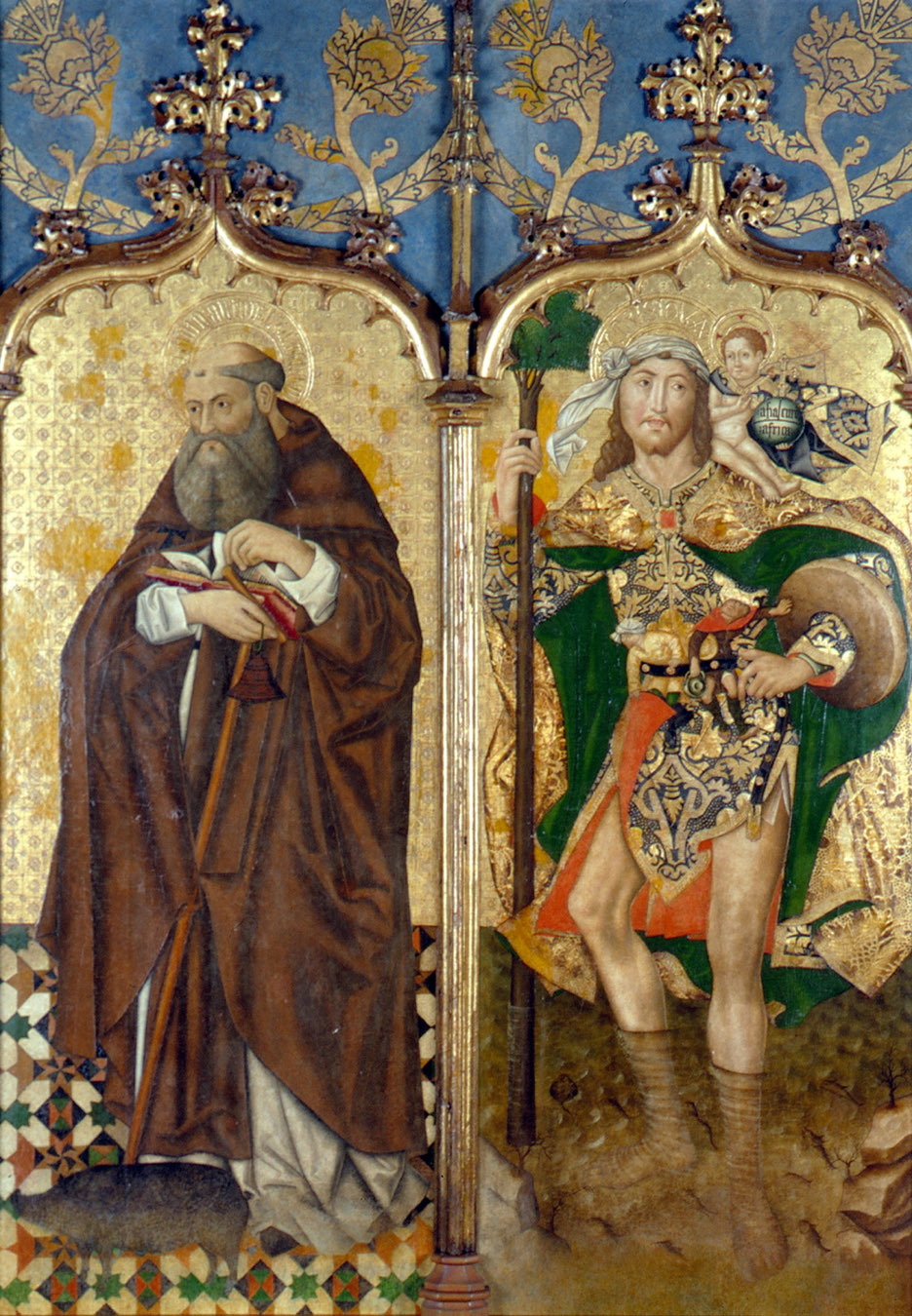
Detail from a work attributed to the Circle of Sánchez Castro, in the Museo de Bellas Artes de Sevilla.
