= Jaume Morera i Galícia =

Spanish painter

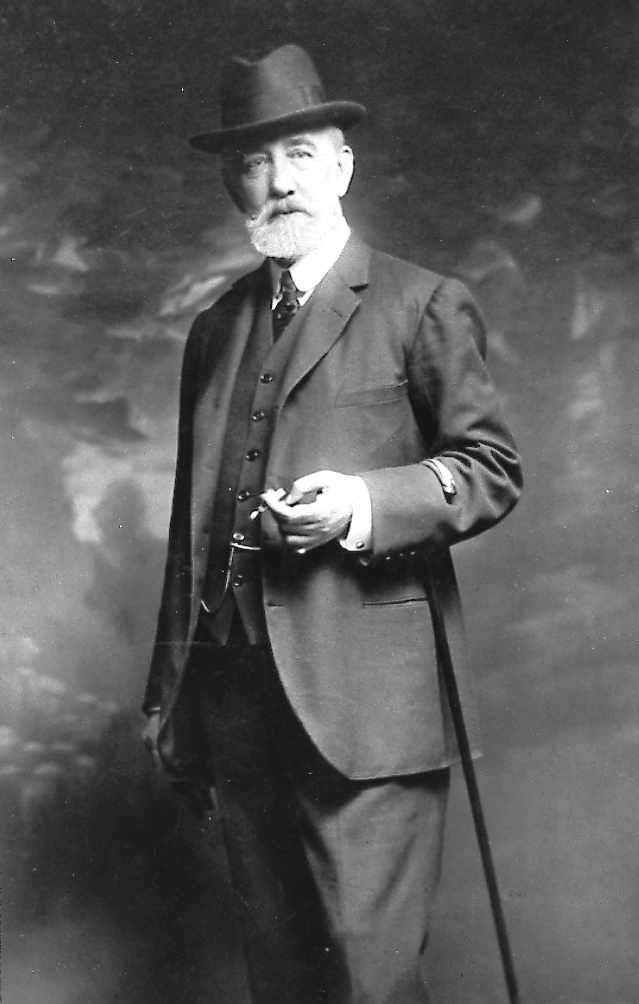
Jaume Morera i Galícia (date unknown)

Jaume Morera i Galícia (1854 – 24 April 1927) was a Catalan landscape painter.

== Biography ==
He was born in Lleida. His family was from a small town and had been attracted to Lleida by business opportunities. He moved to Madrid to study landscape painting at the Real Academia de Bellas Artes de San Fernando under Carlos de Haes. In 1874, he was chosen to be one of the first students at the newly founded Spanish Academy in Rome, together with Francisco Pradilla, Casto Plasencia and Alejandro Ferrant. While there, he produced many paintings of the Italian countryside in the Academic style.

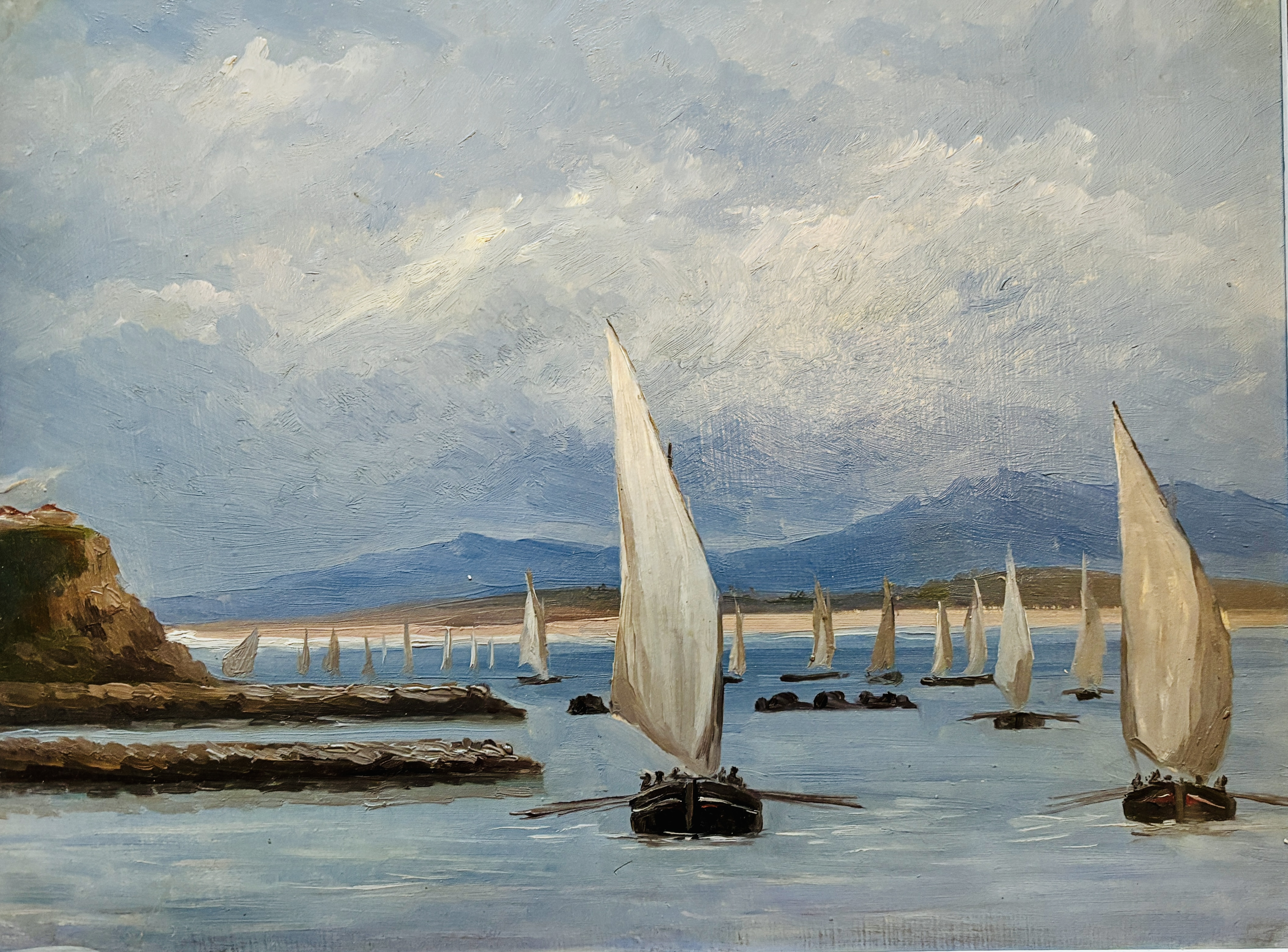
La Regata (ca. 1911)

Upon his return to Spain in 1877, he stayed only briefly in Lleida, then established himself in Madrid. Nevertheless, he maintained a lifetime connection to his native city. From his base in Madrid, he travelled widely, often accompanied by Haes, visiting the Netherlands, Belgium and France. From these places, he produced works that he displayed at the annual National Exhibition of Fine Arts, winning several medals.

In 1900, he married María Felisa Alday, who had been Carlos de Haes' caretaker during the latter's final days. The couple took up residence on a farm near a small village between Madrid and the Basque Country.

In 1915, he returned to his hometown to help establish the "Museu d'Art Modern de Lleida", a large portion of which was devoted to the works of Haes that had been left to him in Haes' will. Eventually, his contributions to the museum were considered so significant that it was renamed the Museu d'Art Jaume Morera in 1924.

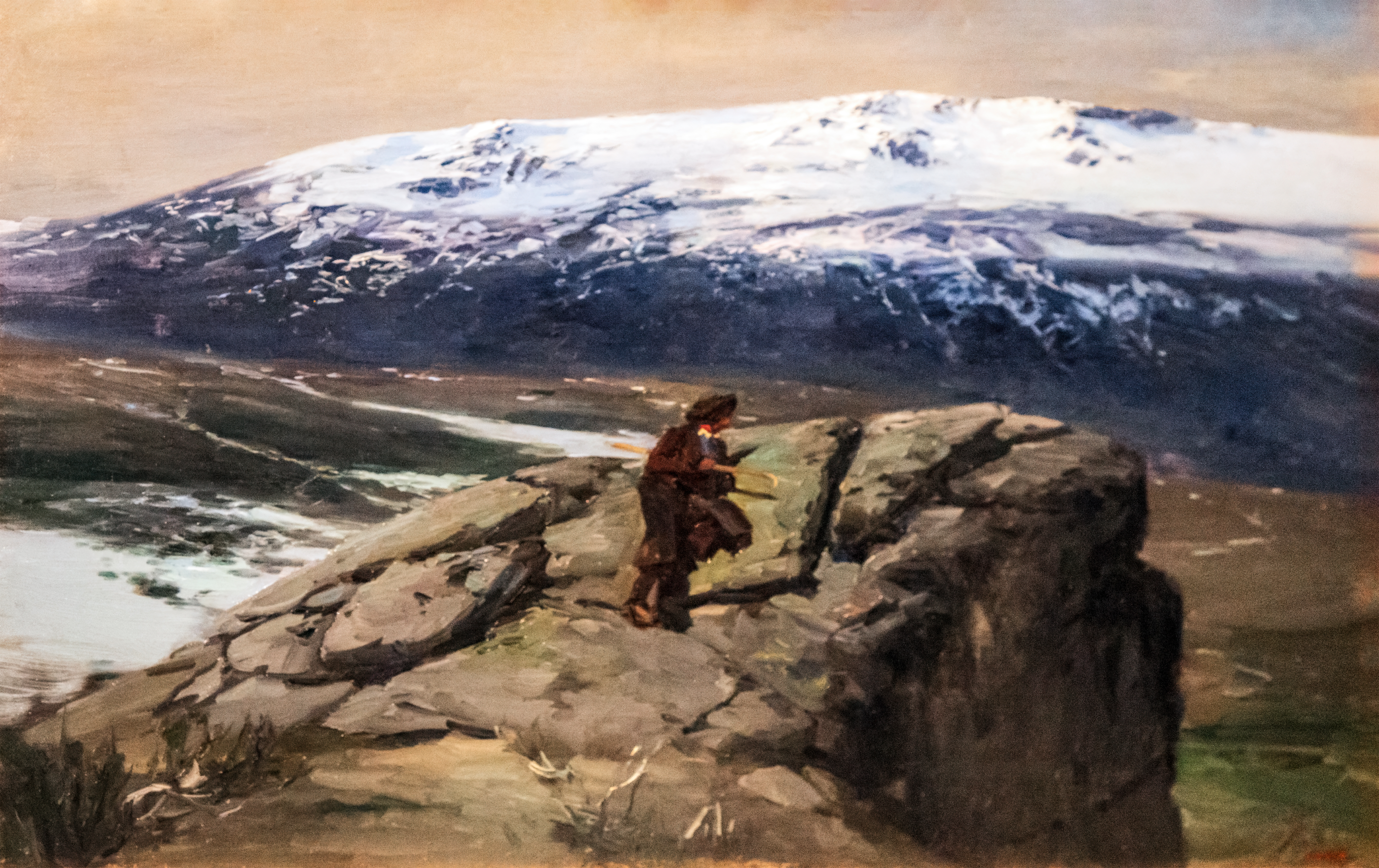
Peñalara in the Sierra de Guadarrama (c.1891)

He was attracted to Nordic-style landscapes and spent much of his time painting in the Sierra de Guadarrama. He also painted along the coast of Northern Spain near Algorta. He died in Madrid.

His brother was the politician and poet Magí Morera.

His work has been offered at auction multiple times, and show up around 2-3 times a year across the globe with realized prices ranging up to 35,000 USD. In 2004 Plaza de la Iglesia Santa Coloma de Queralt, sold at Christie's London in 2004 for 35,000 USD.
