= Xavier Gosé =

Spanish painter and artist (1876-1915)

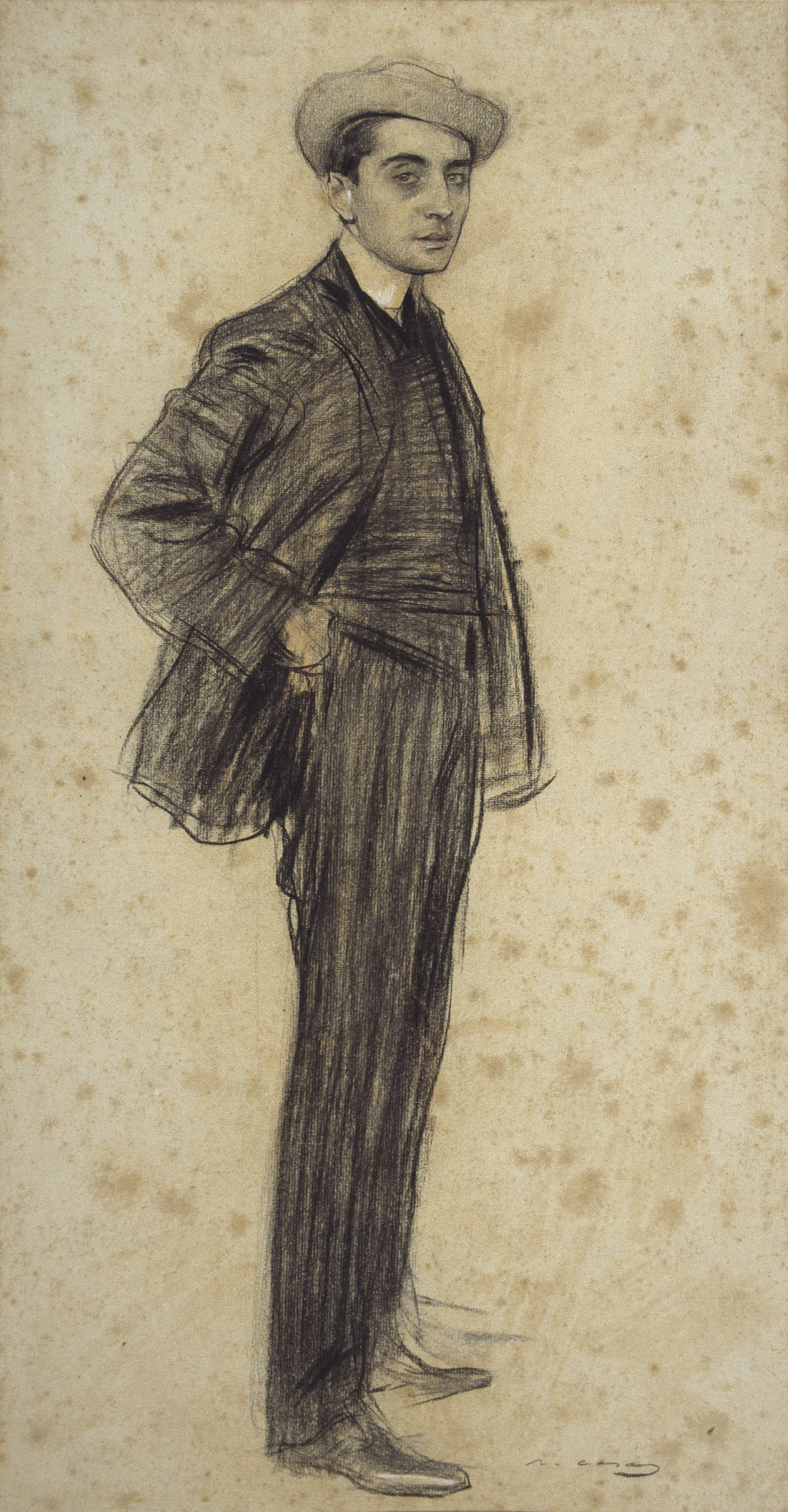
Xavier Gosé, by Ramon Casas (date unknown)

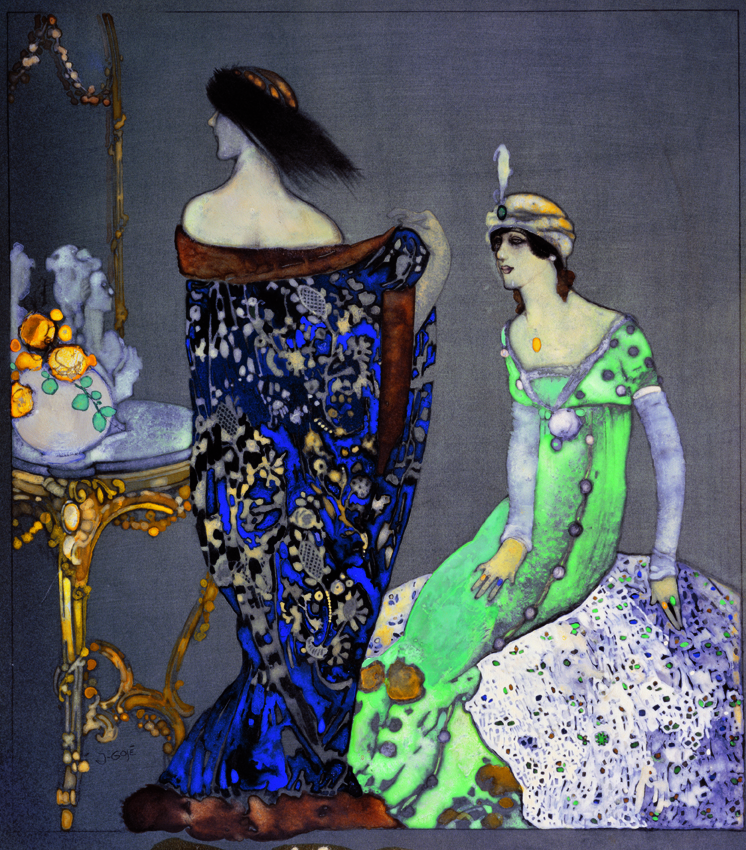
The Blue Mantle (1912)

Xavier Gosé i Rovira (1876, Alcalá de Henares – 16 March 1915, Lleida) was a Catalan painter and illustrator who worked in the Art Nouveau and Art Déco styles.

== Biography ==
His father was an agronomist and died when Xavier was only four years old. The family then returned to Barcelona, where he was enrolled at the Escola de la Llotja in 1894, and studied with Josep Lluís Pellicer. From 1895 to 1898, he provided illustrations for several well-known magazines including L'Esquella de la Torratxa. A frequent customer at Els Quatre Gats, he held an exhibition of his drawings there in 1899.

In 1900, he moved to Paris and, two years later, where he contributed as a caricaturist for two satirical magazines: Le Rire (The Laugh) and L'Assiette au Beurre (The Plate of Butter), while continuing to provide drawings for publications in Barcelona. He also contributed to the German Art Nouveau magazines Jugend and Simplicissimus. During these years, he also participated in several exhibitions throughout Spain and in Mexico, on the occasion of that country's centenary. In 1912, he participated in a major exhibition devoted to artists from Lleida Province and, the following year, his works were shown in Buenos Aires.

When World War I began to have its effects in Paris, he returned to Catalonia and died of tuberculosis shortly thereafter. That same year, a retrospective of his work was organized at the "Reial Cercle Artístic de Barcelona" and his paintings became the first major acquisition for the Museu d'Art Jaume Morera, which has also held retrospectives; one as recently as 2009.
