= Giacomo Francesco Cipper =

Italian painter (1664–1736)

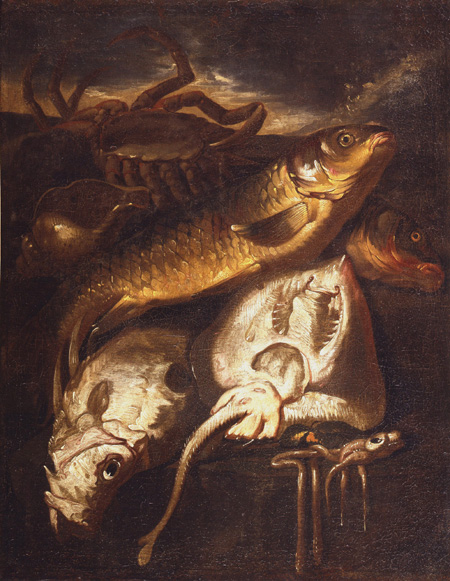
Still life of fish and shellfish by Giacomo Francesco Cipper

Giacomo Francesco Cipper, also known as Il Todeschini, (1664–1736) was an Austrian painter in Milan from 1696 to 1736.

== Biography ==
Cipper was born in Feldkirch, Austria. He was working in Milan in the first half of the 18th century. A highly productive painter of landscapes in the Caravaggesque style, his first attributed work is dated 1700. He operated in Lombardy and in the Veneto (see for instance his Hunters and greengrocers, at the Gallery Campori, Modena; and his Family of peasants at Venice in the Galleries of the Academy). Subsequently, the artist, perhaps under the influence of the Giacomo Ceruti (some of whose works were once attributed to him), moved away from the scrupulous observation of detail, replacing it with a less representational vision, one more sensitive to the play of light.

His last known work is Self-portrait (1736), now at Hampton Court Palace.
