= Pelegrí Clavé =

Spanish painter

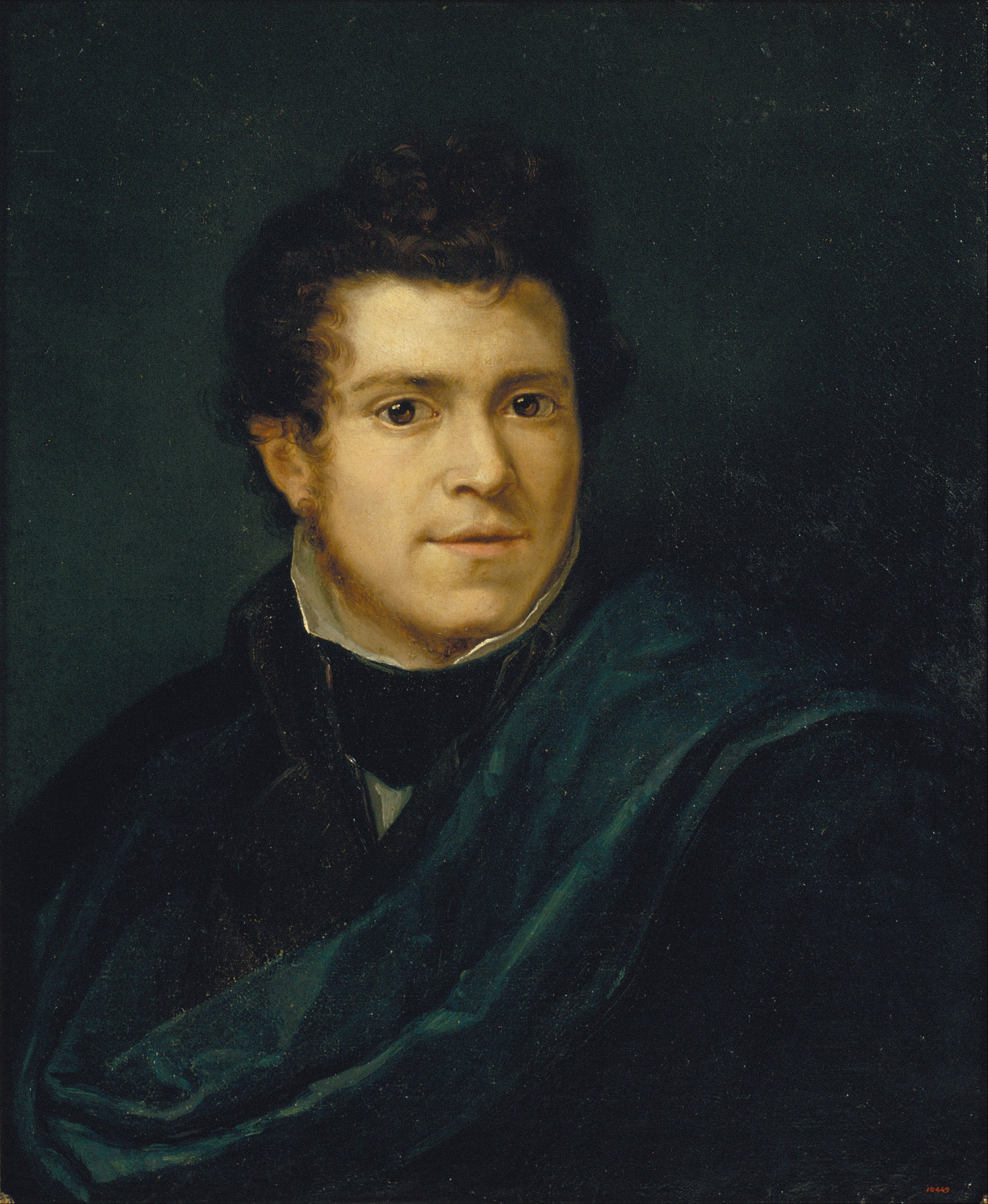
Self-portrait (1835)

Pelegrí Clavé i Roqué sometimes Pelegrin Clavé (17 June 1811, Barcelona – 13 September 1880, Barcelona) was a Spanish painter in the Romantic style who lived and taught in Mexico for many years.

== Biography ==
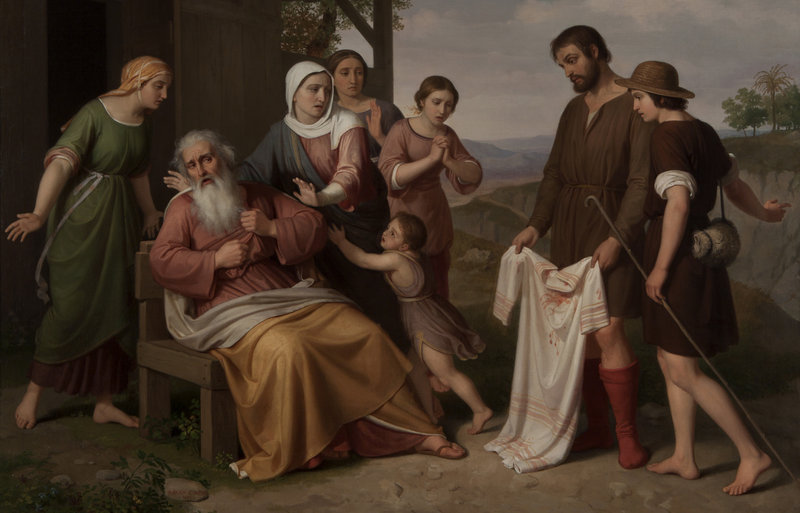
Jacob Receives the Bloody Robe of his son Joseph (1842)

From 1822 to 1833, he studied at the Escola de la Llotja; his teachers included Salvador Mayol and Pau Rigalt. While there, he received several awards. After graduating, he became one of the first recipients of a study grant from the "Junta de Comerç" (Board of Trade).

In the Spring of 1834, he went to Rome where he enrolled at the Accademia di San Luca; studying with Pietro Tenerani and Tommaso Minardi, who introduced him to Friedrich Overbeck and the Nazarene school of painting. During this period, he travelled widely throughout Italy and France and exhibited in Milan. When he had finished his fellowship, he decided to stay in Rome and attempt to earn his living as a painter.

In July 1846, the Chargé d'affaires of Mexico in Rome contracted him and his friend, Manuel Vilar, to become, respectively, the Directors of painting and sculpture at the Academy of San Carlos in Mexico City, where they took up their positions in August. Vilar died there in 1860, and Clavé remained until 1868.

In addition to his official duties, he did portraits of many of the members of Mexican high-society. He and his students also helped to decorate the cupola of the Temple of San Felipe Neri ("La Profesa") in 1867. Unfortunately, their work and much of the cupola was destroyed by a fire in 1914.

In 1868, he returned to Barcelona and was elected to the Reial Acadèmia Catalana de Belles Arts de Sant Jordi, where many of his early works are now housed. He became a member of the jury that decided who is awarded the fellowships for study in Rome. In 1876, he chose Antoni Fabrés, who in his turn would become Director at the Academy of San Carlos.
