= Borsa de Barcelona =

Stock exchange of Barcelona, Spain

Barcelona Stock Exchange
- Borsa de Barcelona
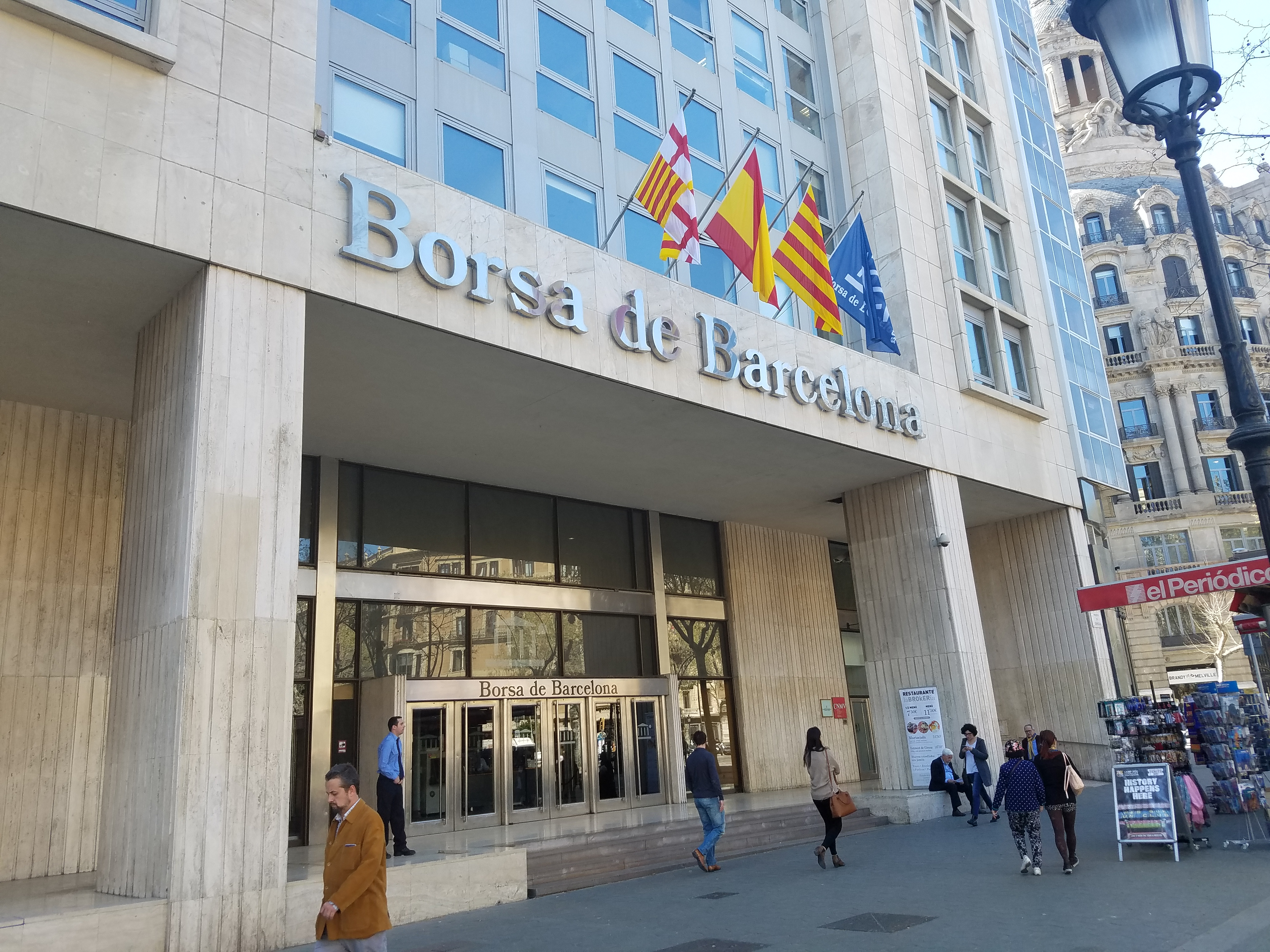
- The Stock Market's facade
- Type: Stock Exchange
- Location: Barcelona, Spain
- Founded: 1915
- Owner: Bolsas y Mercados Españoles
- Currency: Euro

The Stock Exchange of Barcelona (abbreviation, BCN) (Market Identifier Code: XBAR) is a stock exchange located in Barcelona, and is one of the main exchanges in Spain. It is located in the Eixample District, on Passeig de Gràcia.

== History ==
The exchange opened in 1989, but was officially founded in 1915, using the Llotja de Barcelona from 1989 to 1994 when it moved to the building of the present day.

== Operations ==
It is one of the four main stock exchanges in Spain. In 2001, there were 715 companies that had equity in the exchange. The market cap on the equities totaled about €515.4 billion.

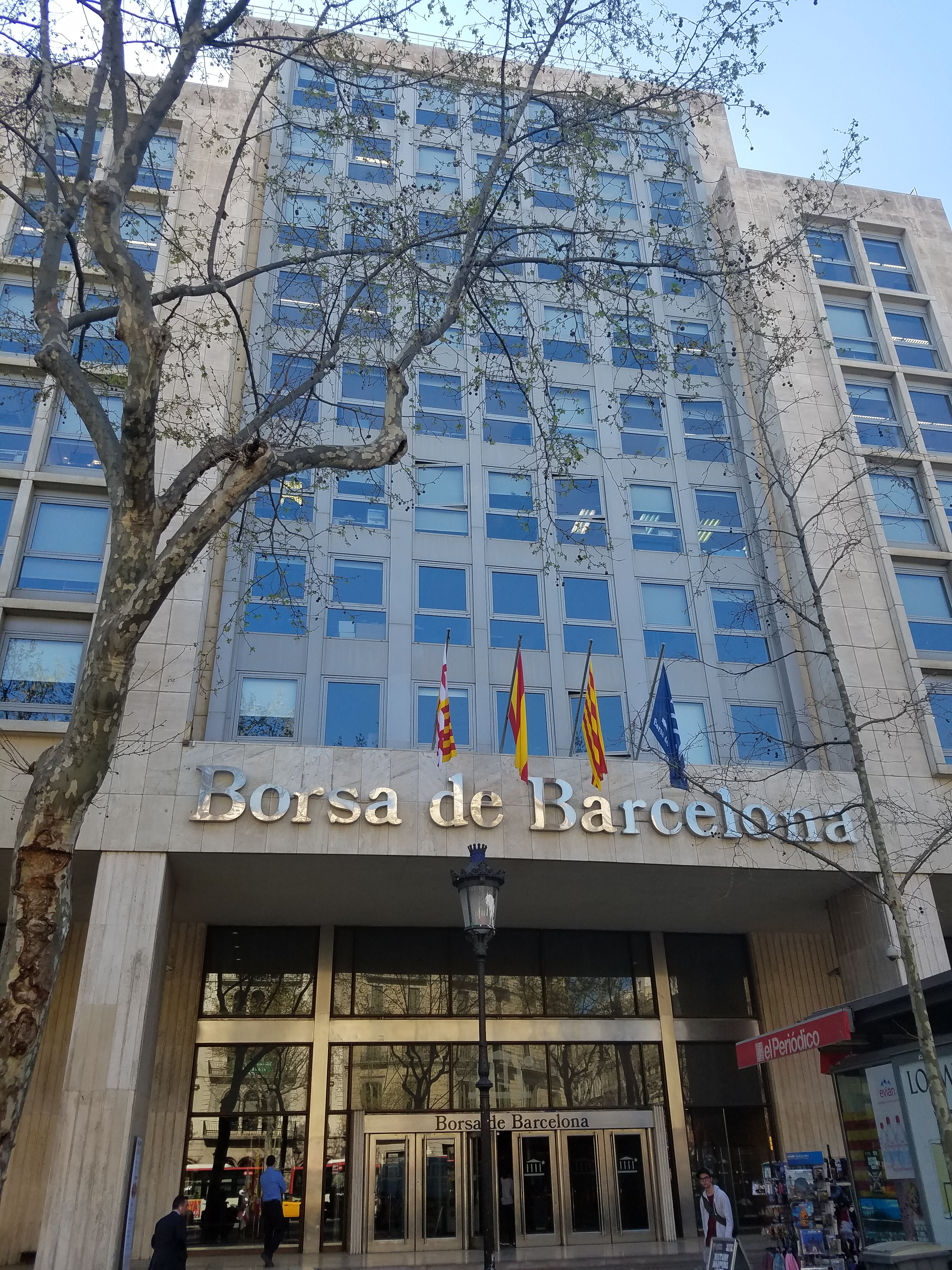
Front of the entire building

== See also ==
- Maria Angels Vallvé, first ever woman stockbroker in Spain
