= Reial Acadèmia Catalana de Belles Arts de Sant Jordi =

Art school in Barcelona, Spain

Coordinates: 41°22′56.65″N 2°11′0.91″E

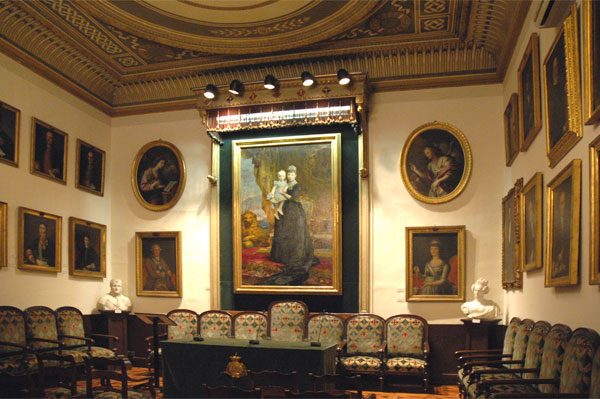
Hall of the Academy, in the second floor of the Llotja de Mar, Barcelona

The Reial Acadèmia Catalana de Belles Arts de Sant Jordi (Catalan pronunciation: [rəˈjal əkəˈðɛmi.ə kətəˈlanə ðə ˈβeʎəz ˈaɾdz də ˈsaɲ ˈʒɔɾði]; English: "Royal Catalan Academy of Fine Arts of Saint George") is a Spanish art school located in Barcelona, Catalonia. The president is the architect Jordi Bonet i Armengol.

The institution was founded as a cost-free school of painting, sculpture and architecture under the former name Escola Gratuïta de Disseny by the Catalan trade council in 1775. In 1849 the school became a member of the provincial academies of arts in Spain (Acadèmies Provincials de Belles Arts), and in 1900 it became autonomous. Today, the ancient school is divided into the faculty of fine arts of the University of Barcelona and the vocational art school, named Escola Superior de Disseny i d'Art Llotja. In 1930 the RACBASJ lost its provincial character and thenceforward it has perceived itself as the Catalan academy of arts. The courses offered include also music and other fine arts.

== Notable alumni ==
- Enric Casanovas i Roy
- Emília Coranty Llurià
- Llucià Navarro i Rodón
- Maties Palau Ferré
- Joan Baptista Porcar i Ripollés
- Leonci Quera i Tísner
- Soledad Sevilla
- Josep Riera i Aragó
Gallery: painting

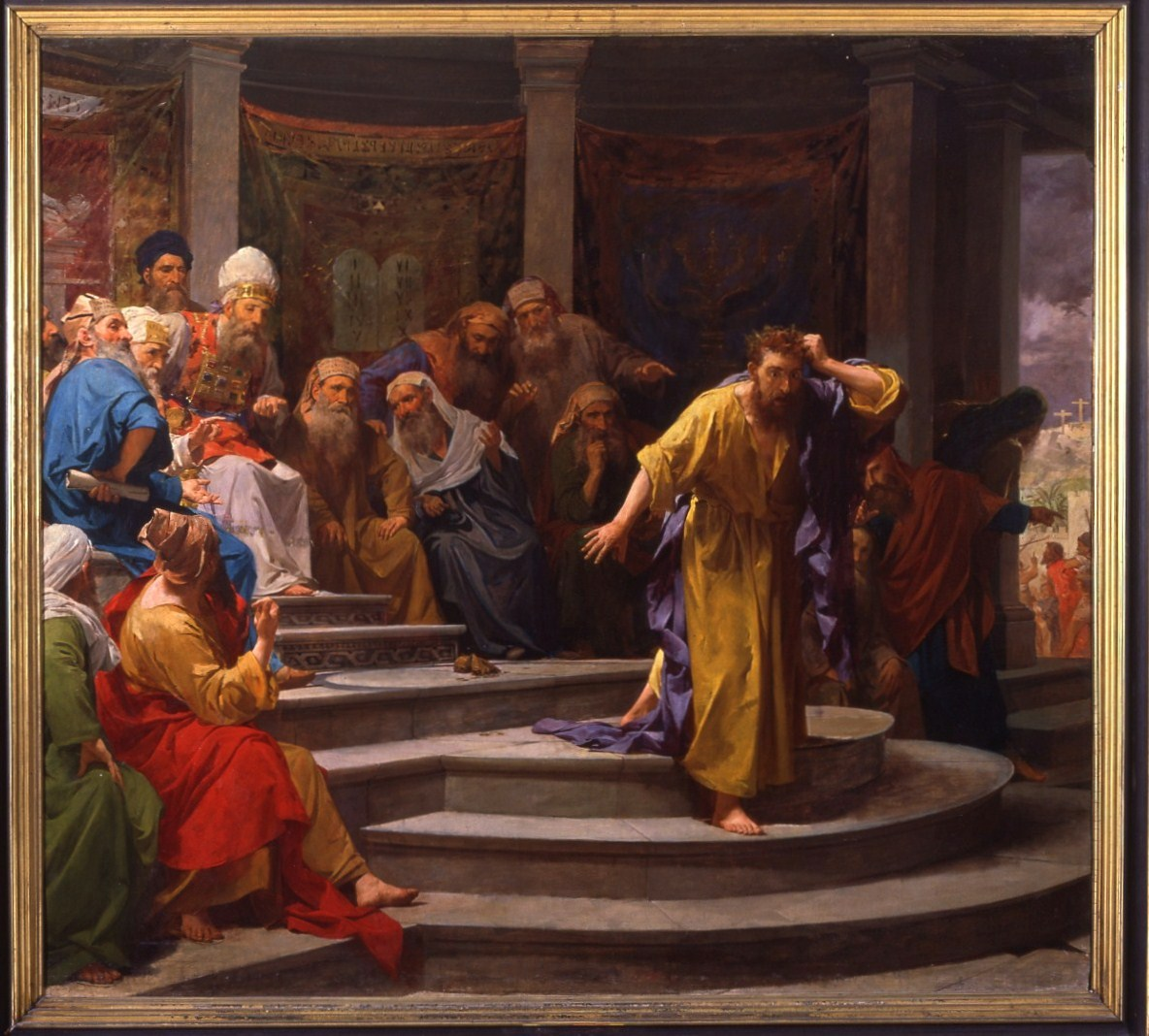
Arrepentimiento de Judas (1874), by Antoni Caba.

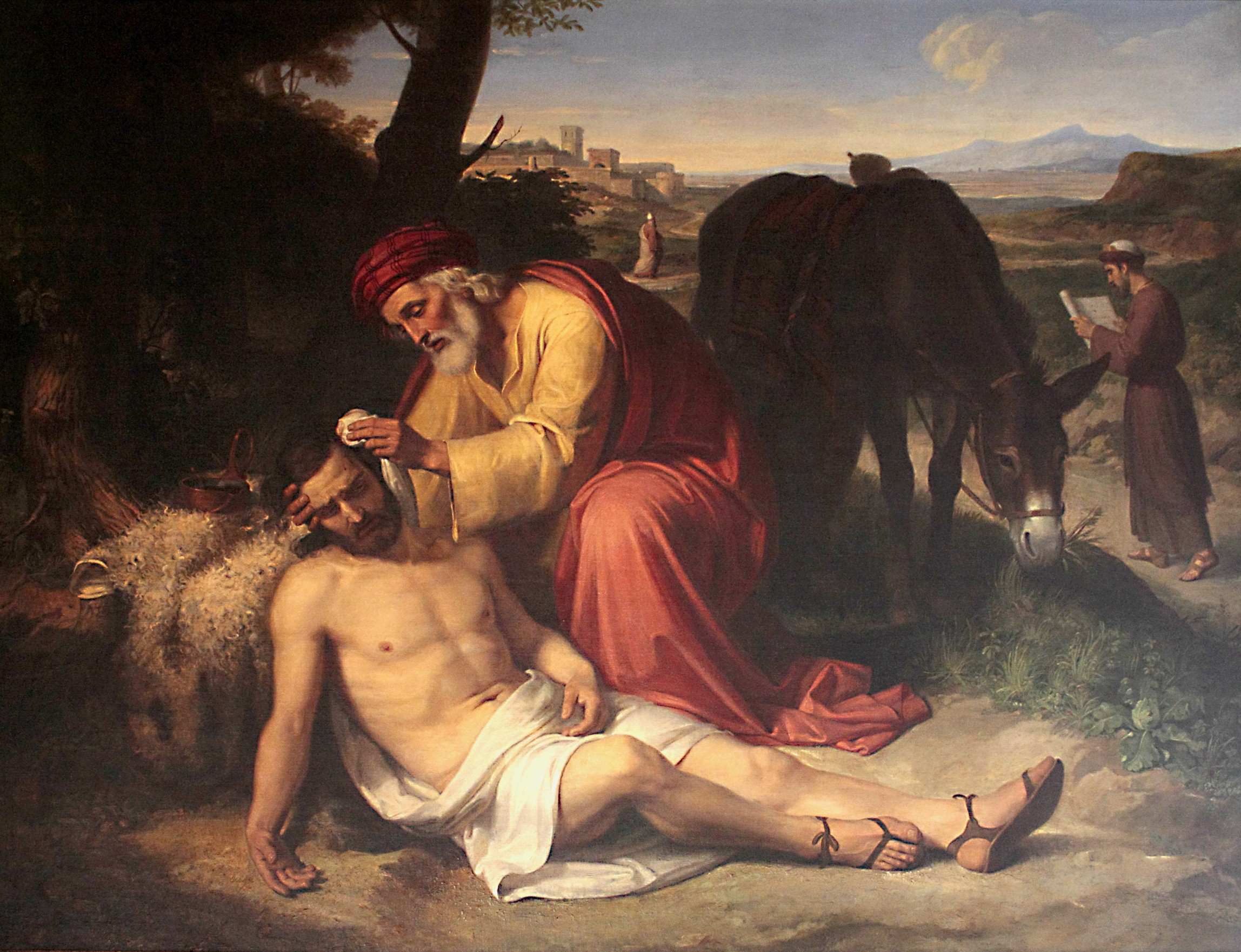
El buen samaritano (1838), by Pelegrí Clavé.

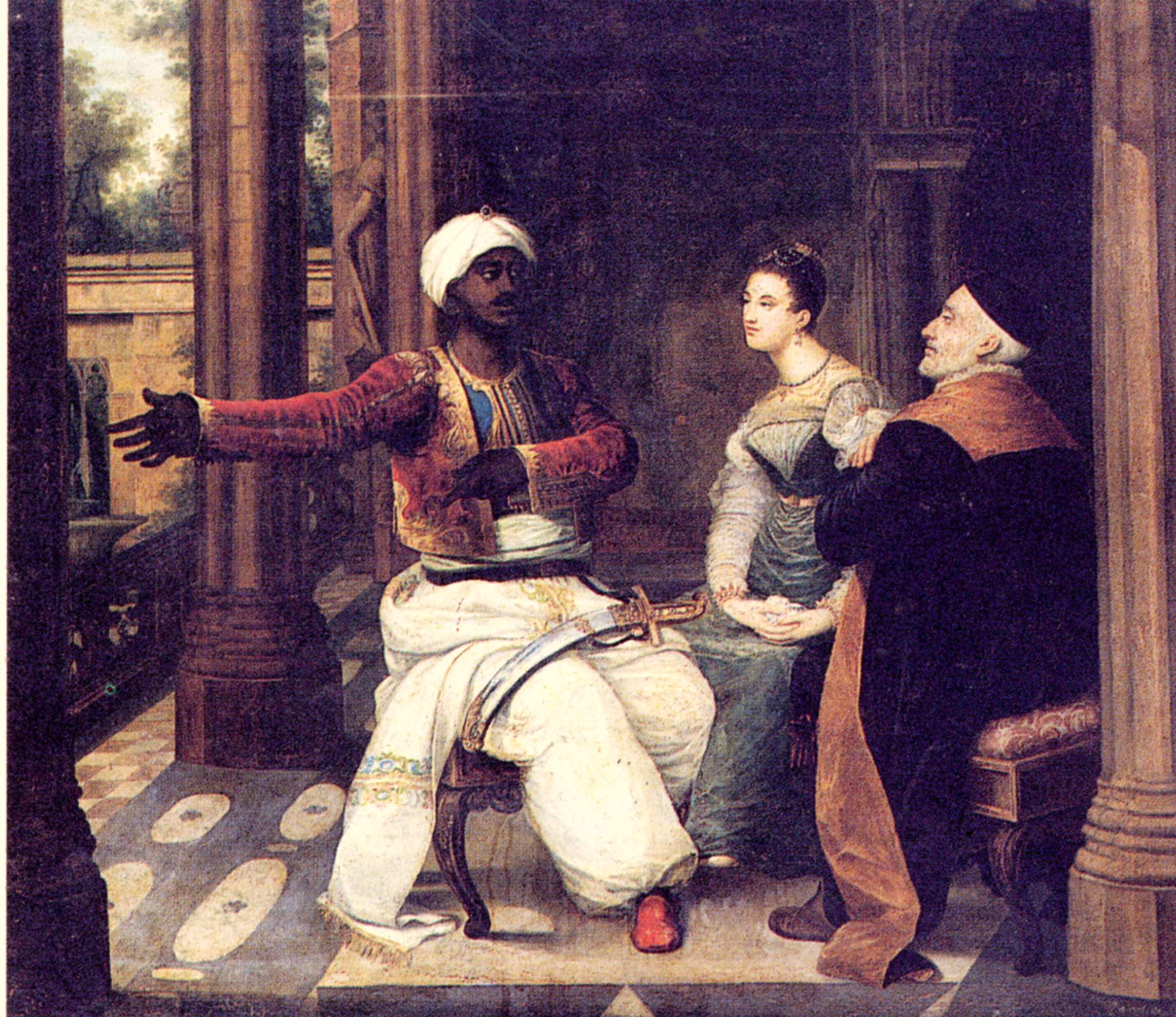
Otelo presentándose al dux de Venecia y a su hija (1837), by Antonio Ferrán.

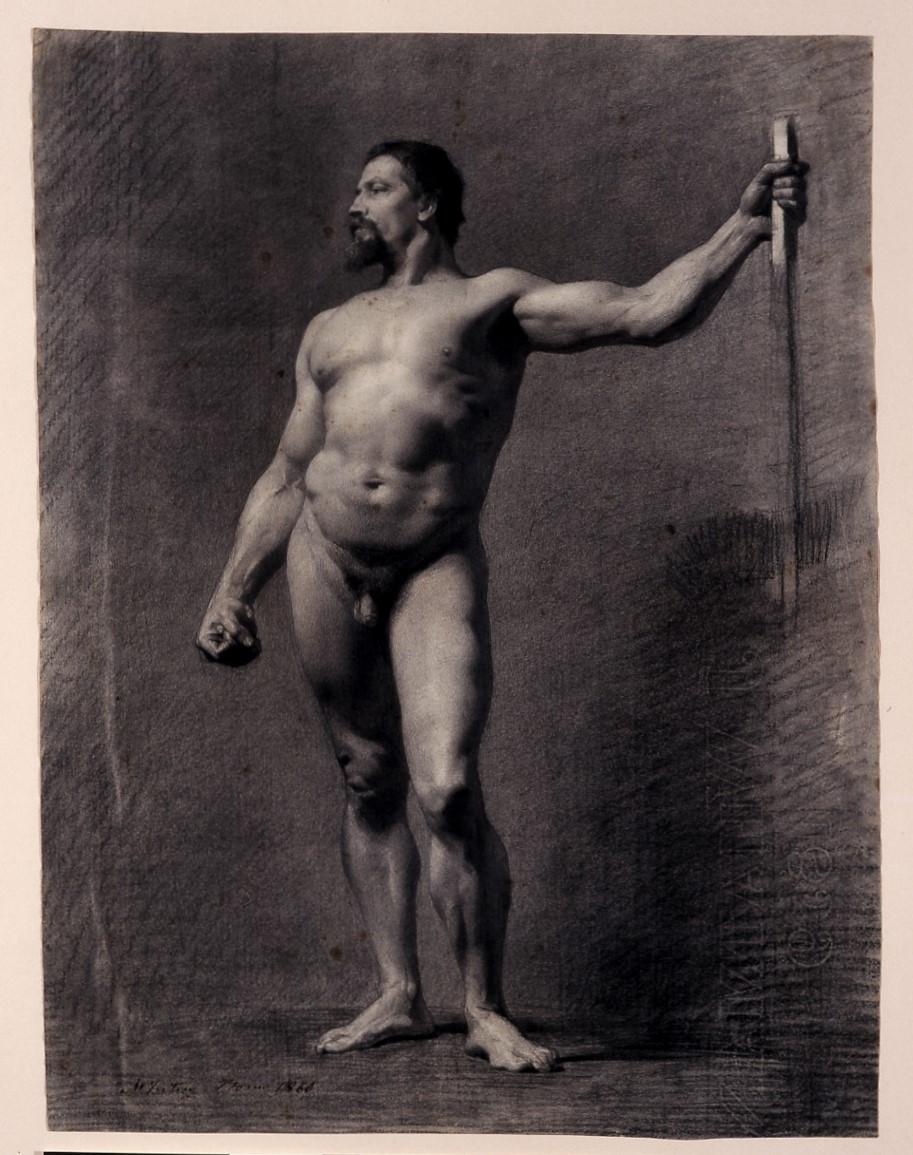
Desnudo masculino con lanza (1860), by Mariano Fortuny.

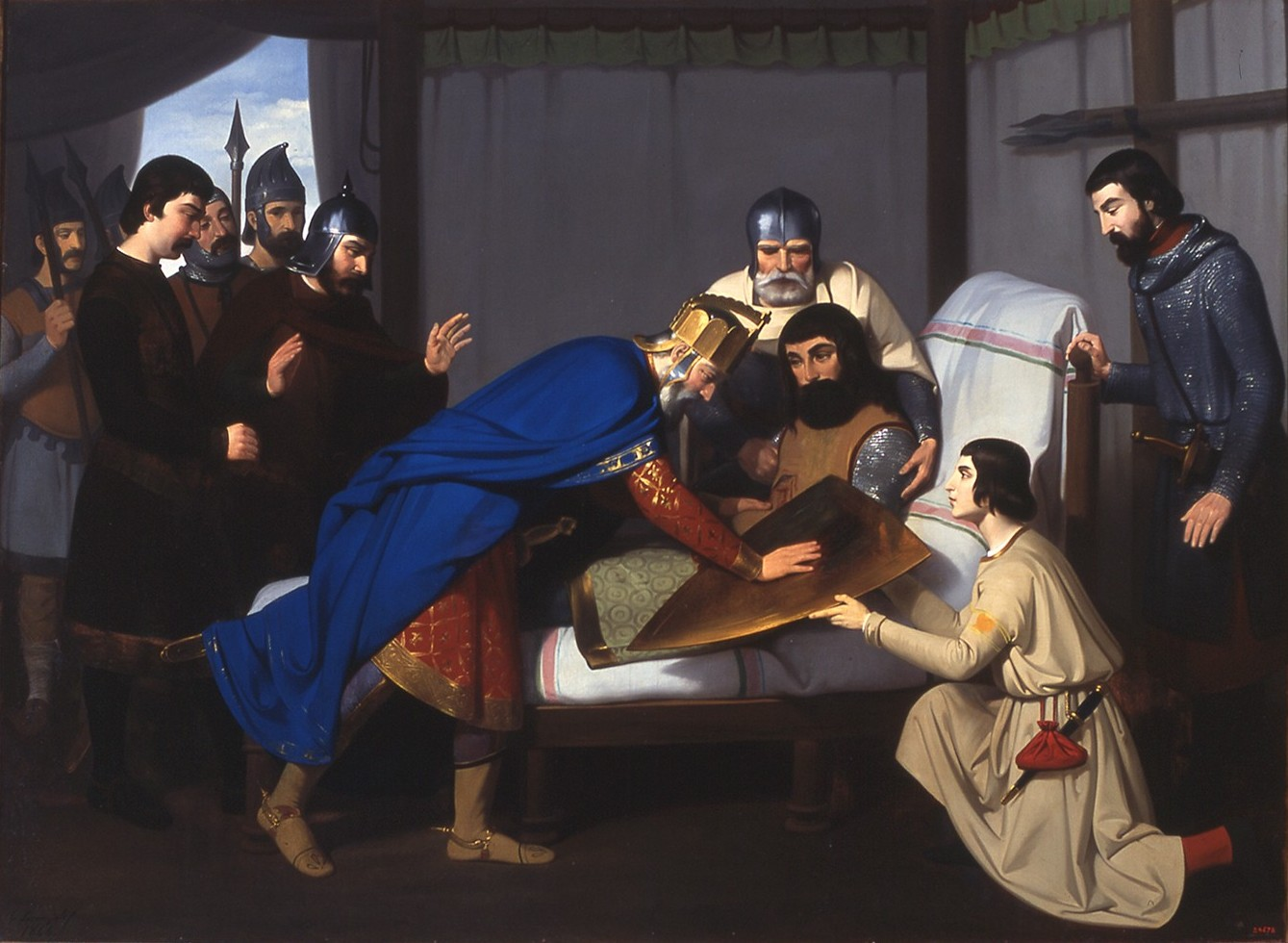
Origen del escudo del condado de Barcelona (1843-1844), by Claudi Lorenzale.

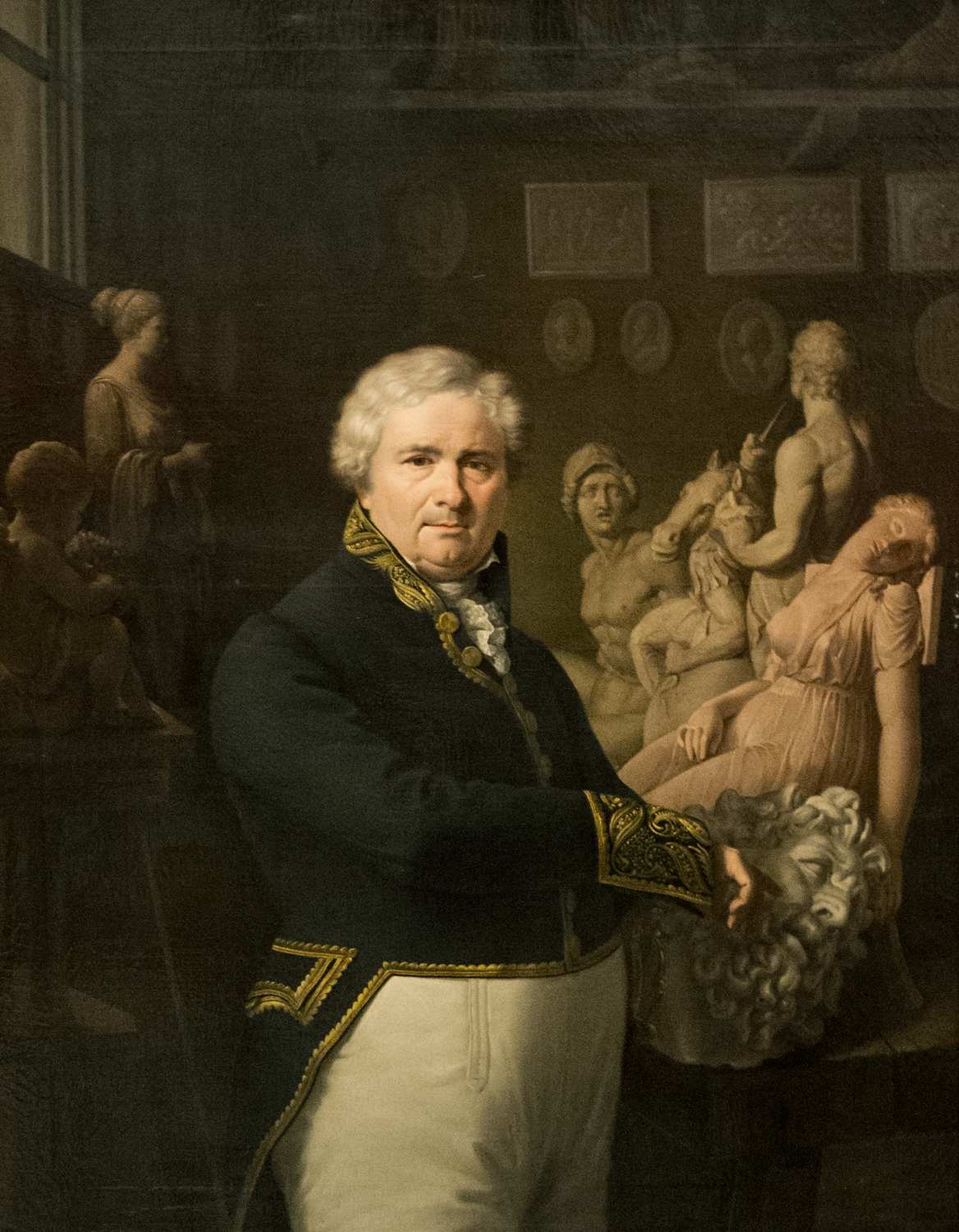
Retrato de Damià Campeny (1838), by Vicente Rodés.

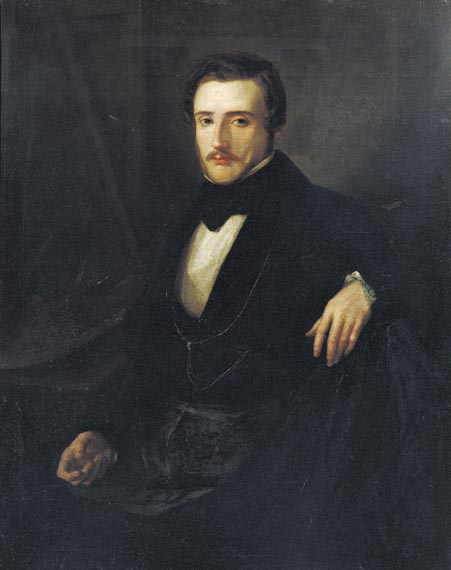
Retrato de Lluís Rigalt (1840), by Ramon Vives Ayné.
Gallery: sculpture

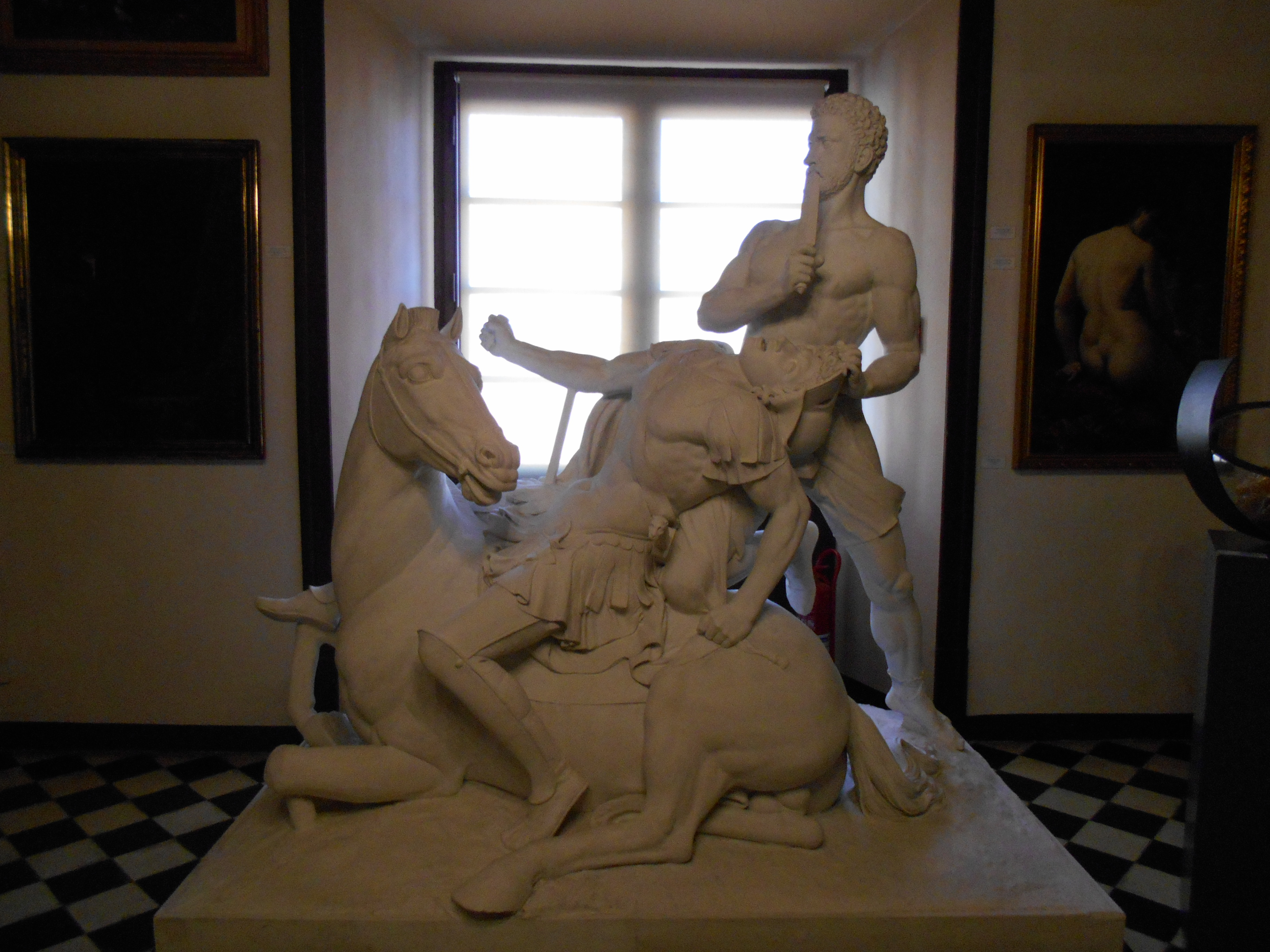
Almogáver matando un caballero francés (1836), by Damià Campeny.

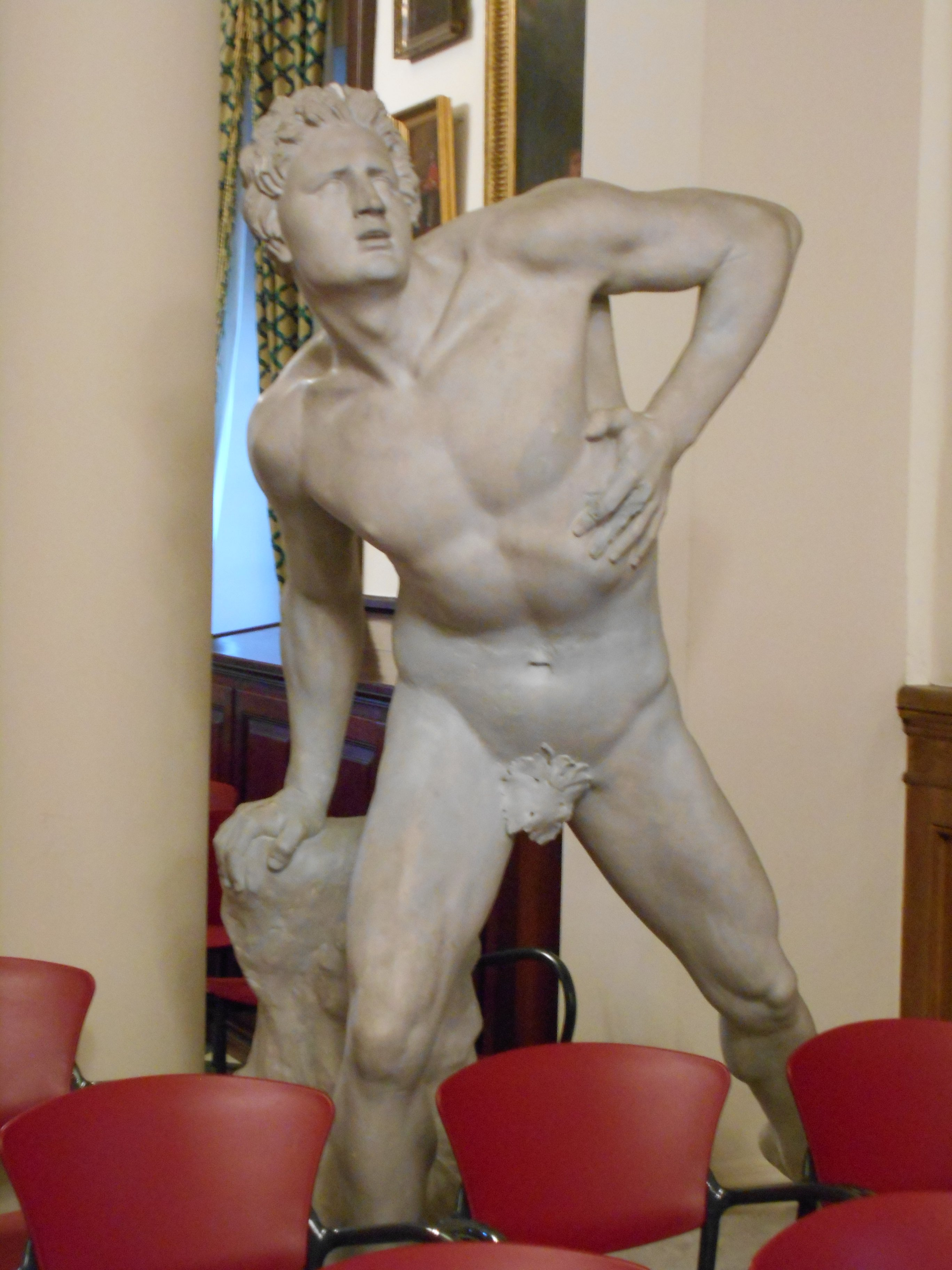
Gladiador herido (1825), by Josep Bover.

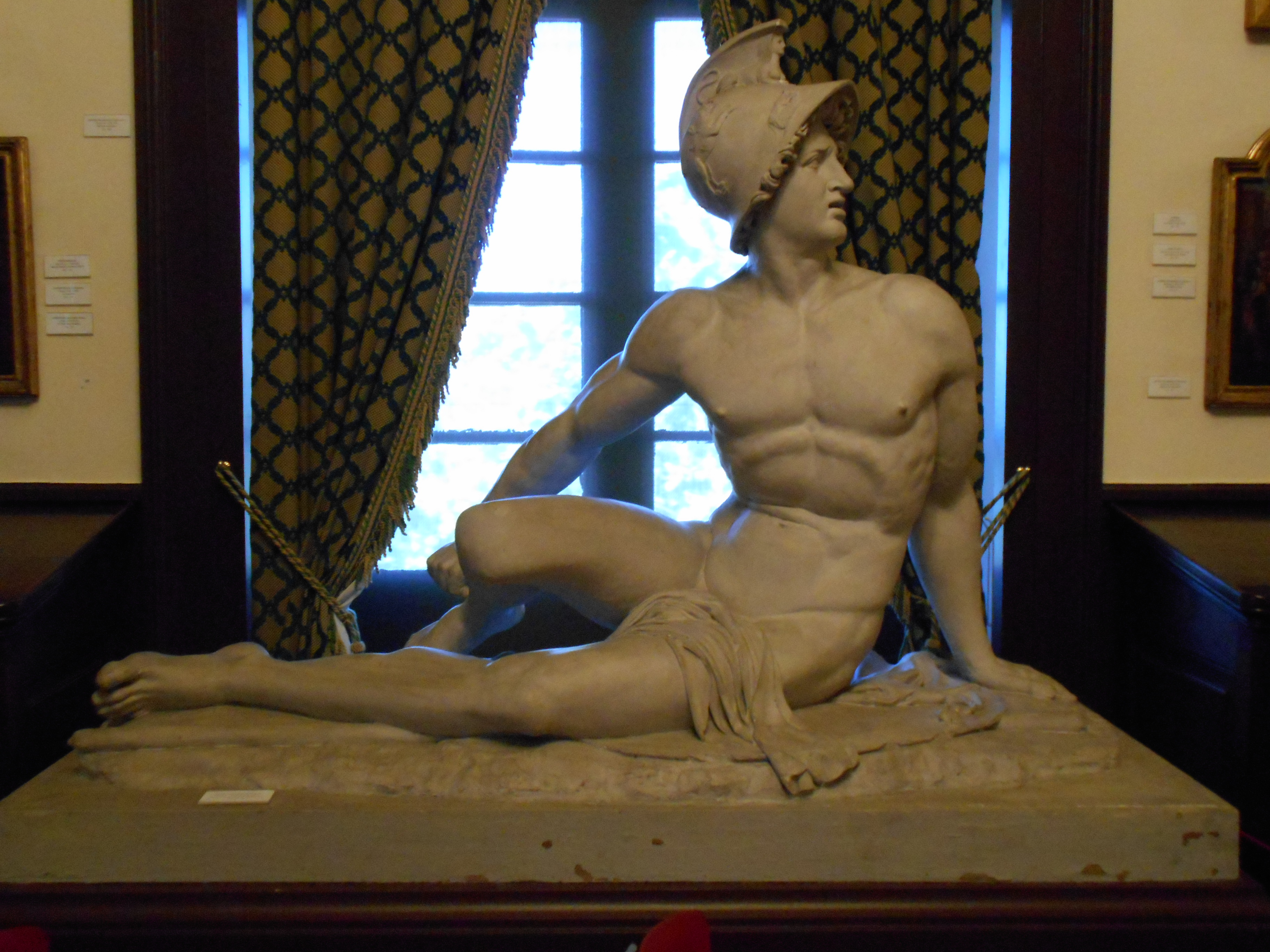
Aquiles arrancándose una flecha (1837), by Damià Campeny.

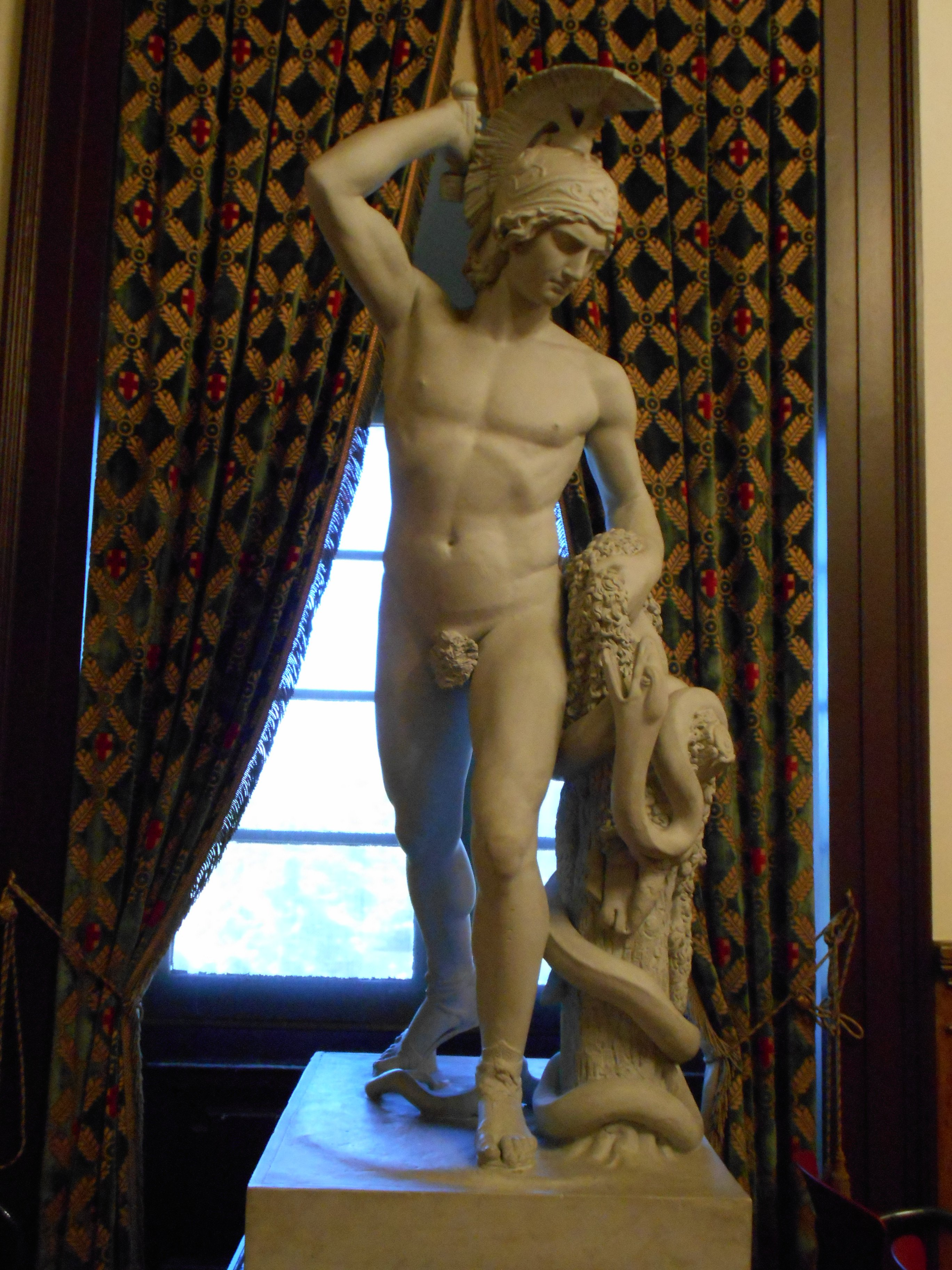
Jasón robando el vellocino de oro (1836), by Manuel Vilar.

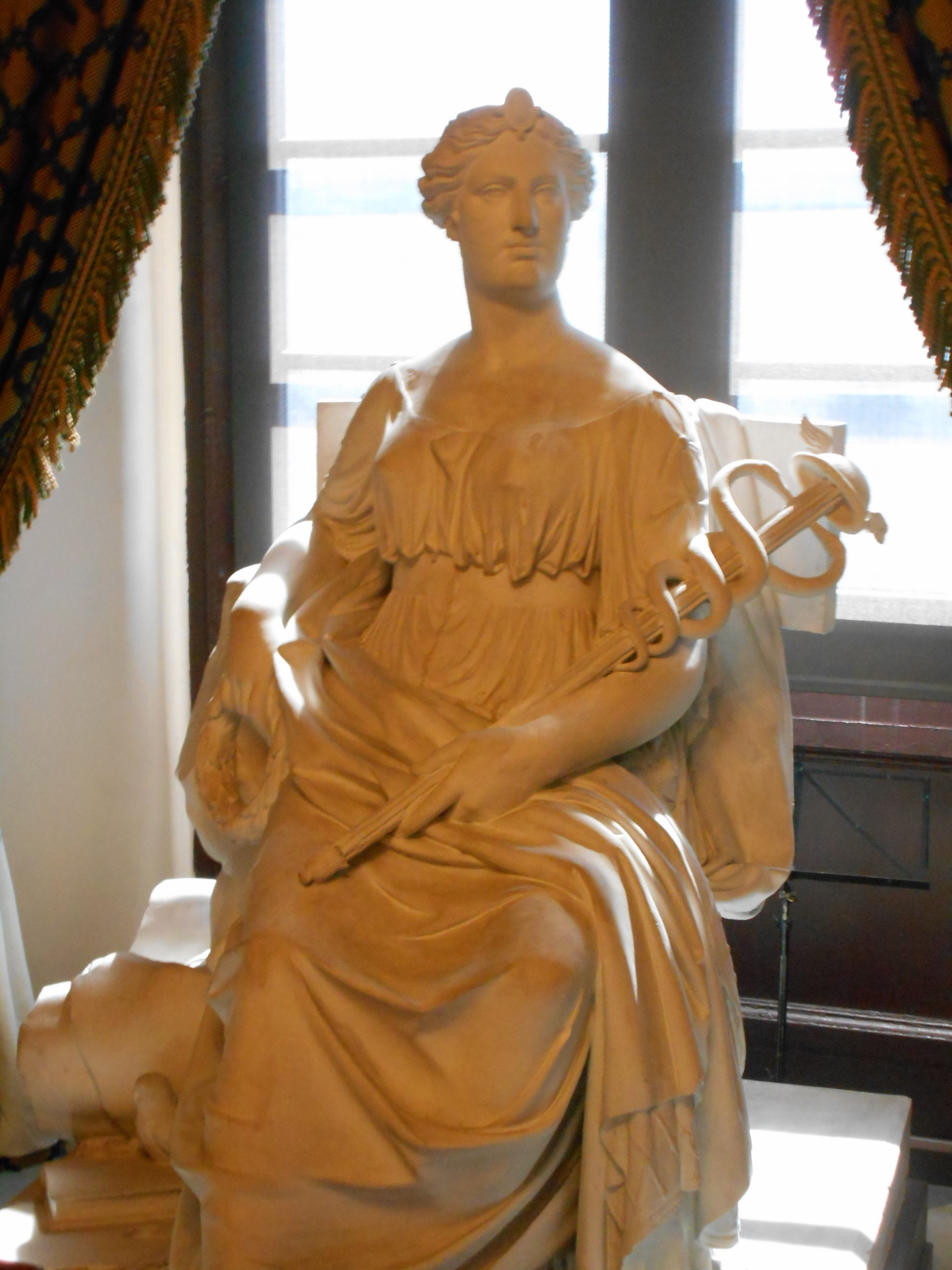
Junta de Comercio (1838–47), by Josep Bover.

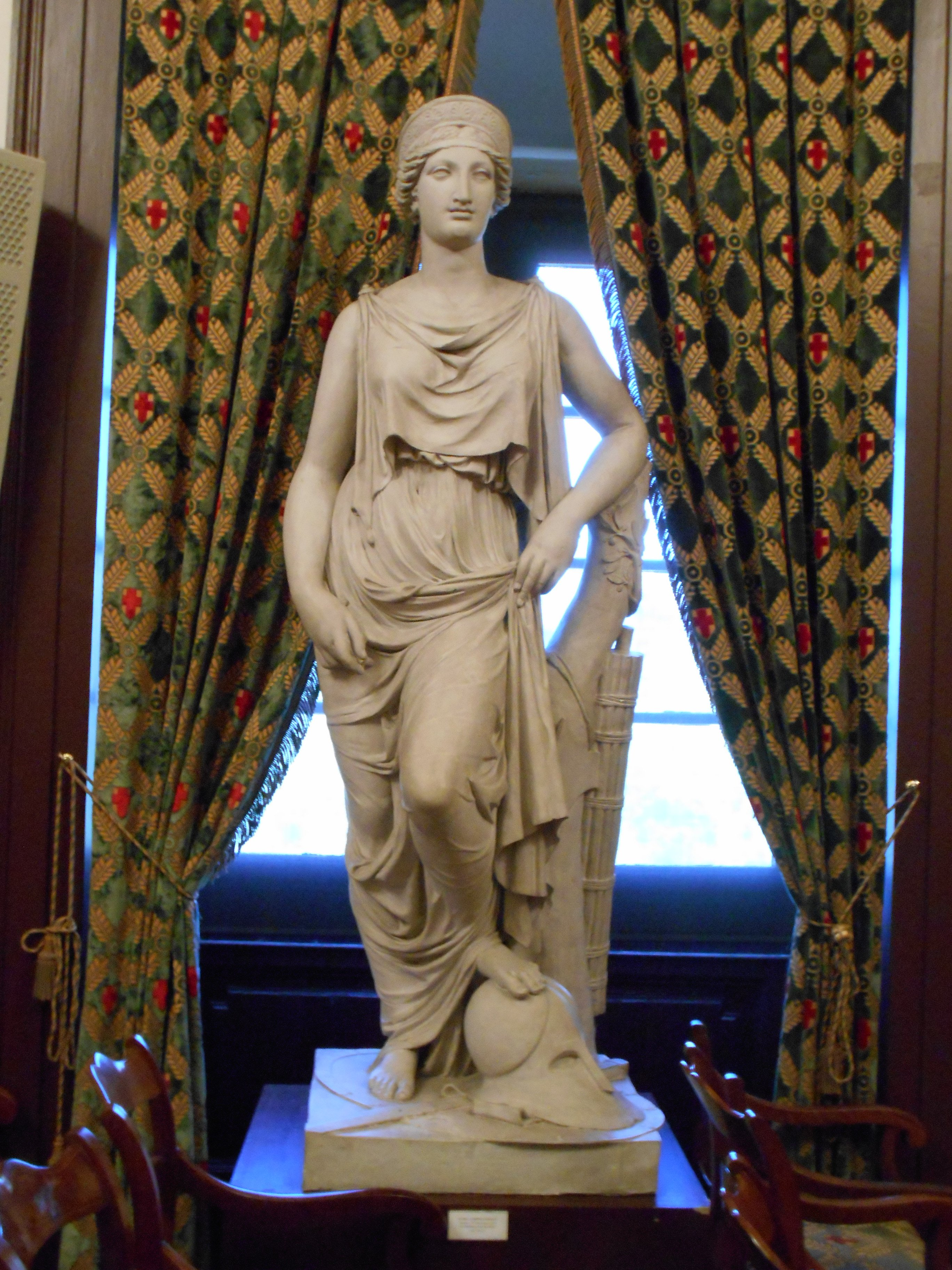
Clemencia o Paz (1827), by Damià Campeny.

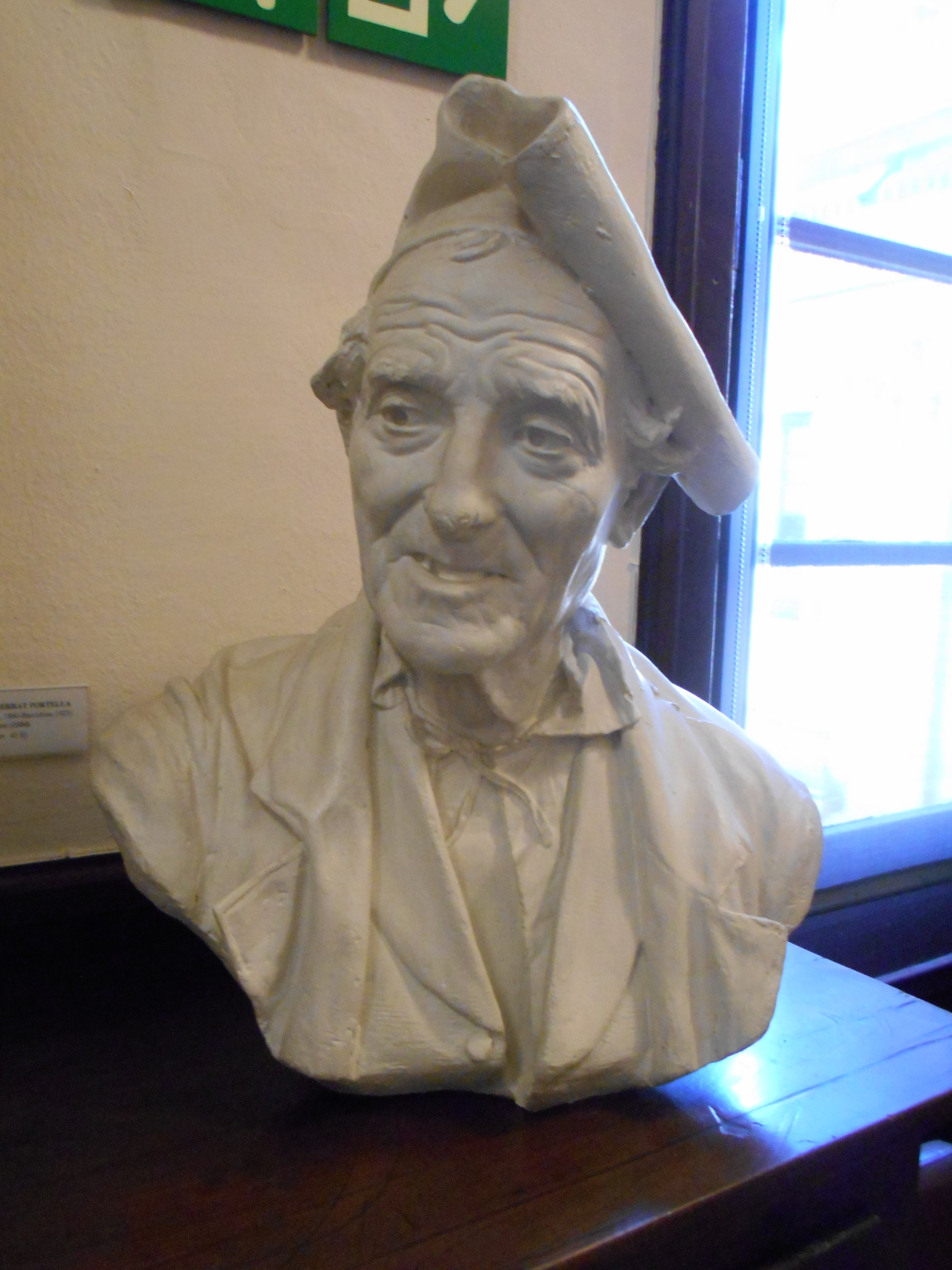
El abuelo (1884), by Josep Montserrat.
