= Lluís Rigalt =

Spanish landscape painter and graphic artist

Lluís Rigalt i Farriols
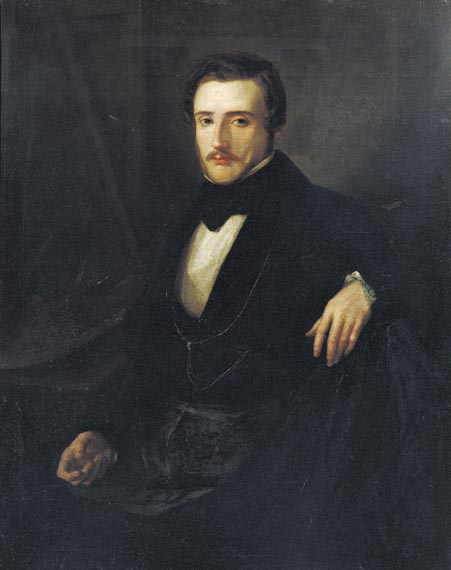
- Portrait of Lluís Rigalt (1840) by Ramon Vives Ayné
- Born: 1814; Barcelona
- Died: 1894 (aged 79–80); Barcelona
- Known for: Painter
- Movement: Romanticism

Lluís Rigalt i Farriols (1814 – 16 April 1894) was a Spanish landscape painter and graphic artist.

== Biography ==
He was born in Barcelona, and came from a family of artists. His father was a painter and scenographer, Pau Rigalt and his uncle Joaquim was an architect. He was a quiet and sickly child and was frequently in poor health throughout his life. His first art lessons were with his father at the Escola de la Llotja in Barcelona, then he went to Madrid, where he studied with Jenaro Pérez Villaamil.

Despite the instability in Catalonia during the 1830s and 40s, he remained aloof from political affairs; although they had a subtle effect on his works. He spent much of his time drawing scenes from the city, rather than painting. After the situation became more settled, the region entered a period when renovation and renewal became the bywords. In 1859, a major urban renewal plan devised by Ildefons Cerdà resulted in the destruction of numerous old buildings. In many cases, Rigalt's drawings from the previous two decades are the only remaining record of those structures.

He was a professor of perspective at the Escola and was named an Academician of Merit by the Real Academia de Bellas Artes de San Fernando. He was also a member of the Reial Acadèmia Catalana de Belles Arts de Sant Jordi. In 1855, he was a member of the commission that prepared the Spanish Pavilion at the Exposition Universelle.

In addition to his paintings and drawings, he did decorative work for Isabel II during her stay in Barcelona and for the funeral of General Francisco Javier Castaños in 1852. Following his father's footsteps, he designed and painted sets for the Teatro de Gracia and the Teatro de la Comedia. Among the books he illustrated were Enciclopédico Pintoresco de Artes Industriales, España Pintoresca and Historia de Cataluña. He died in Barcelona, aged about eighty.

== Selected paintings ==
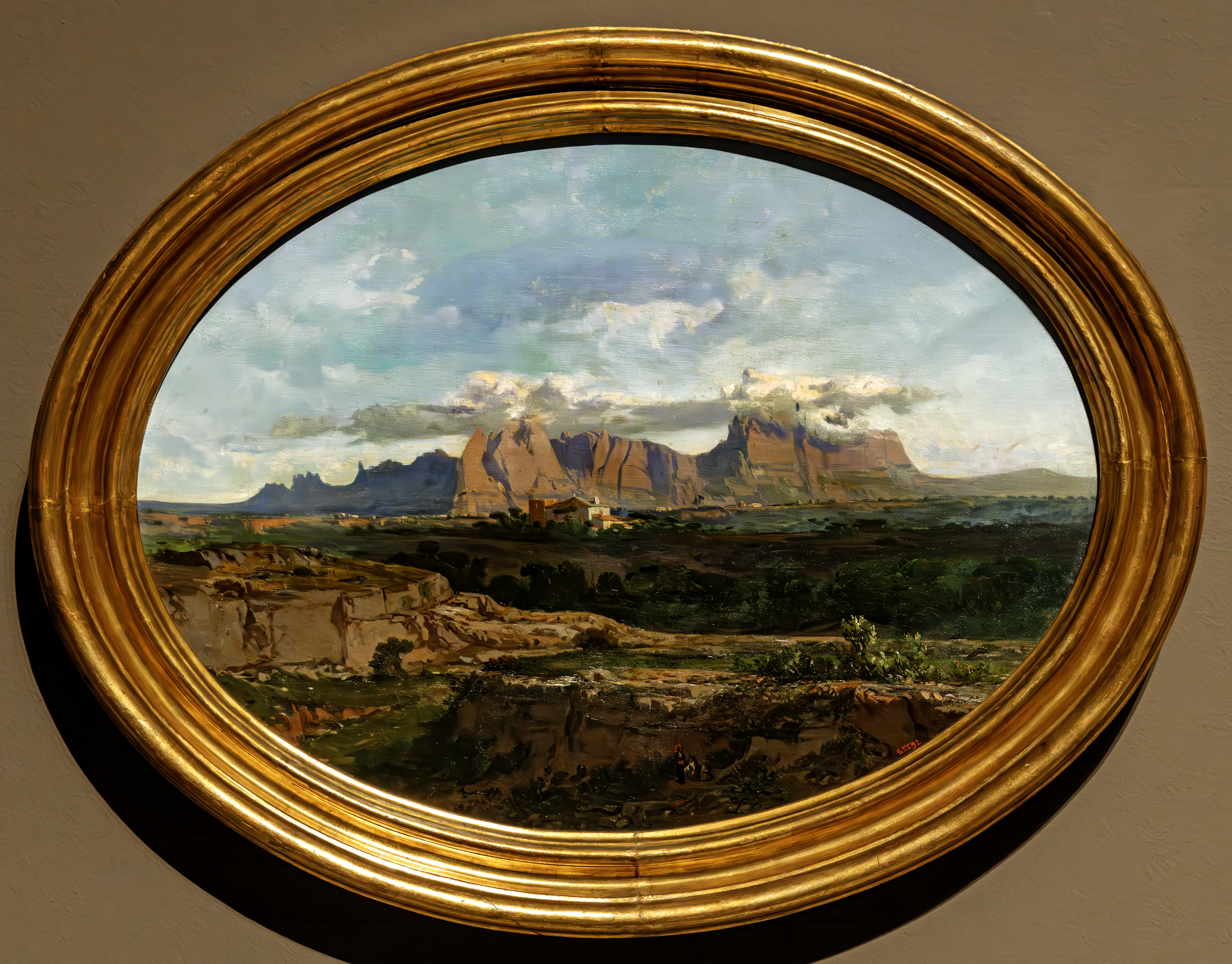
Montserrat Mountain (~ 1840) MNAC

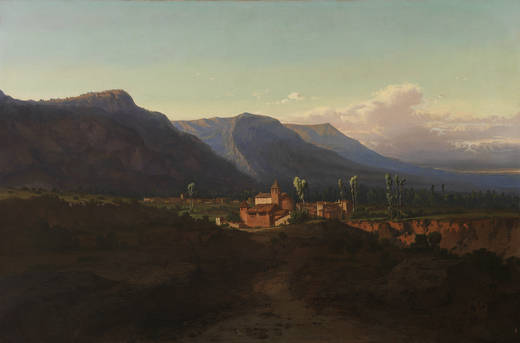
Memories of Catalonia (1858)

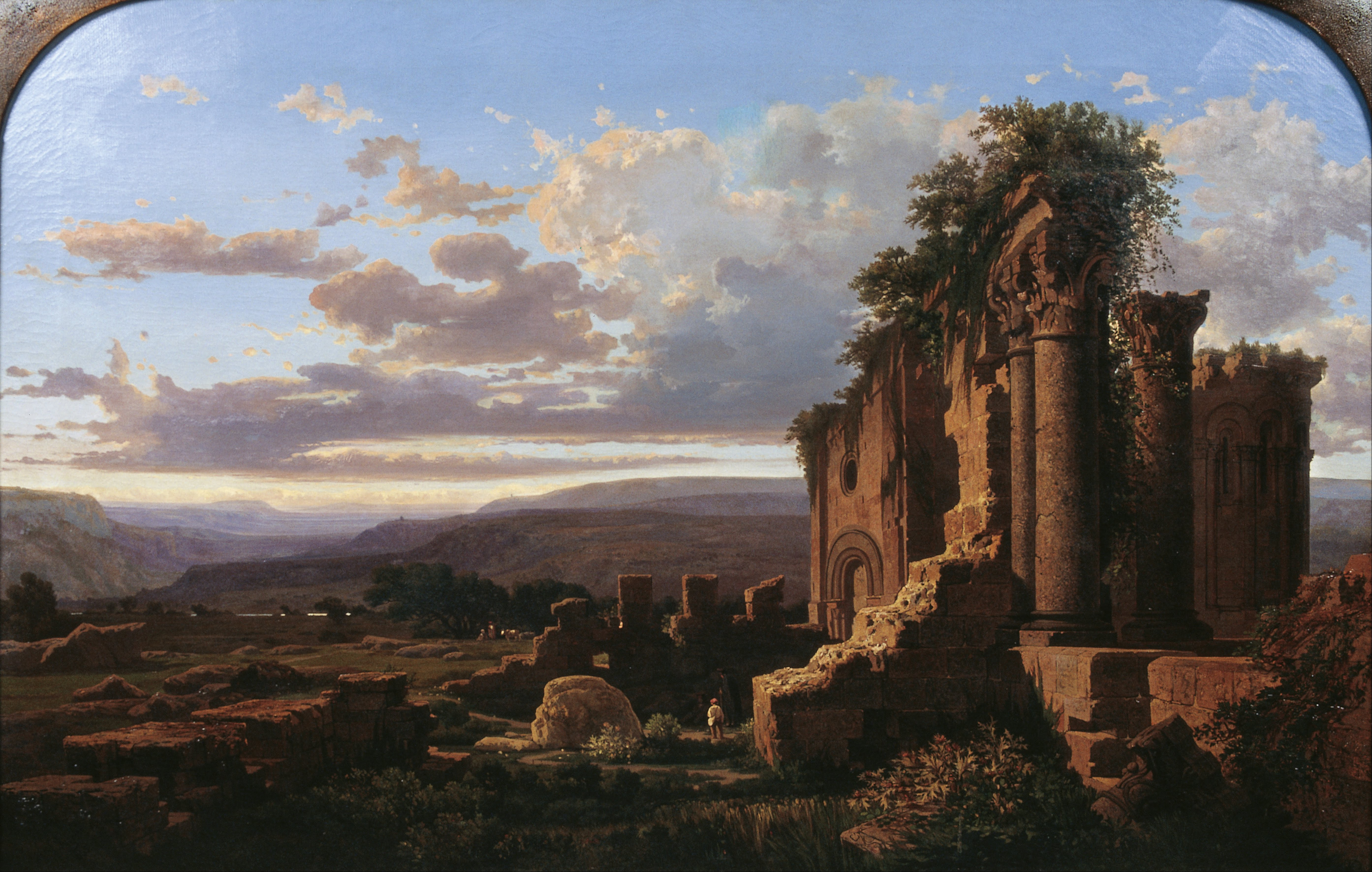
Landscape with Ruins (1865)

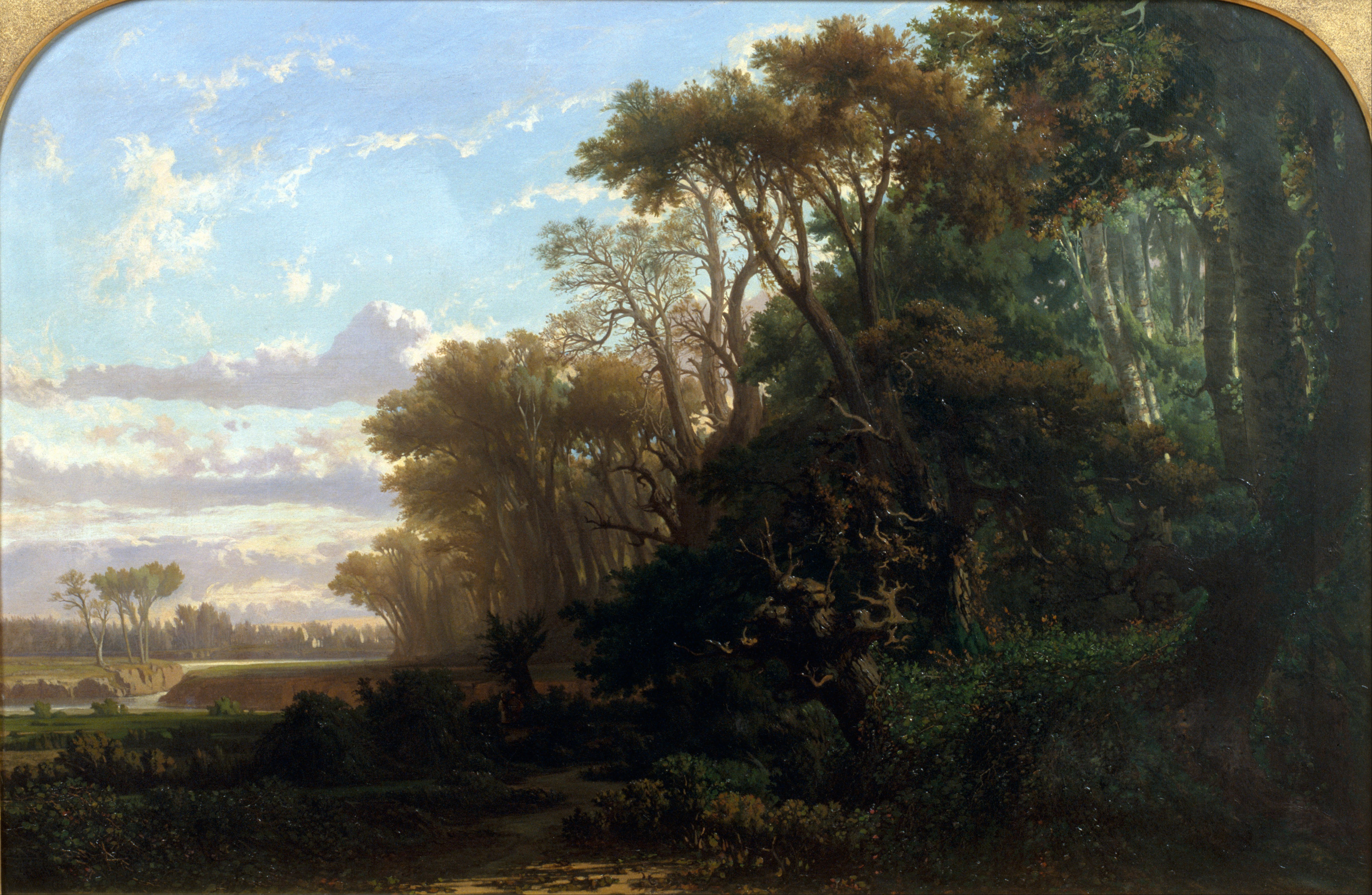
Landscape with Woods (1866)

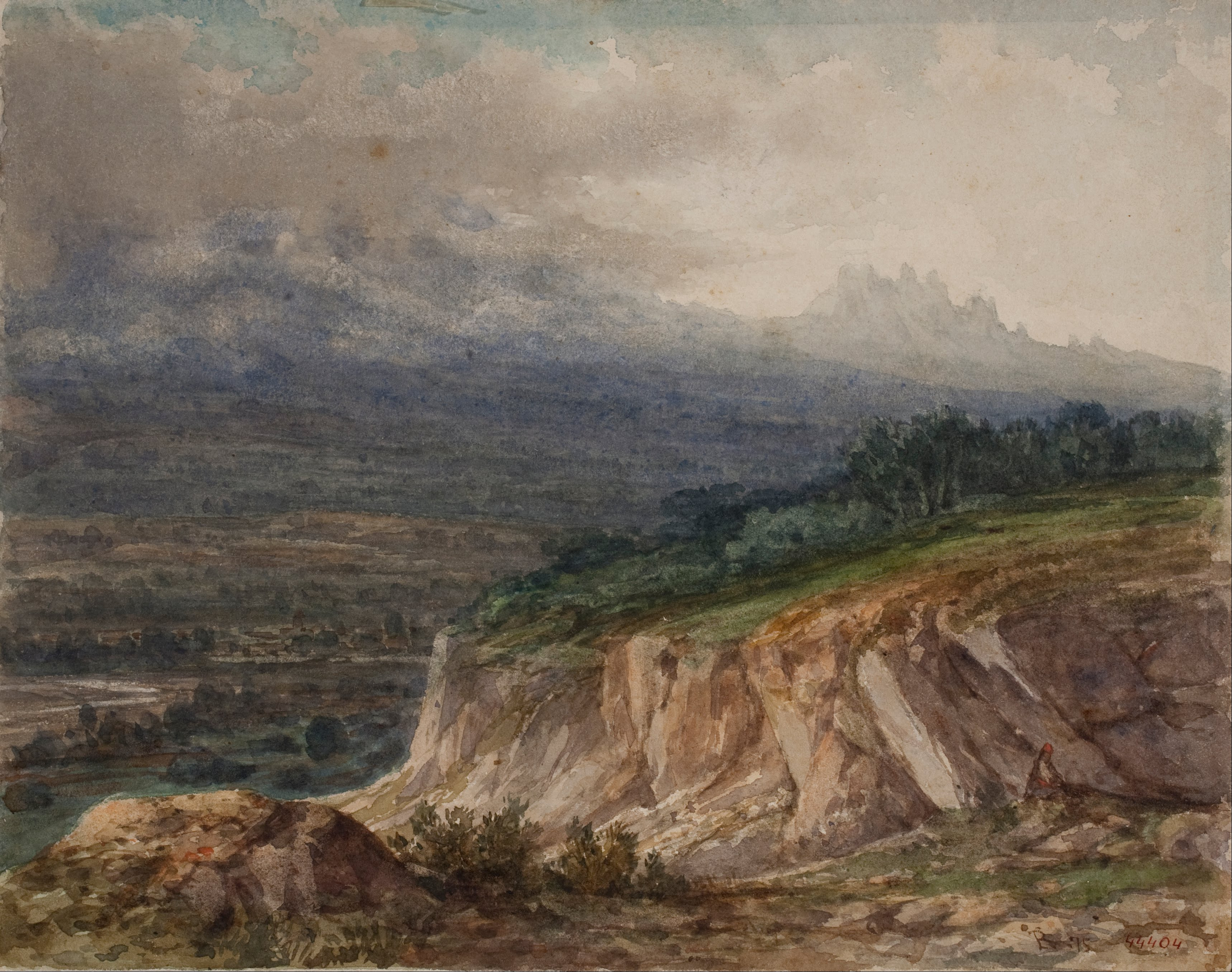
Untitled landscape (1875)
