= Maties Palau Ferré =

Spanish painter

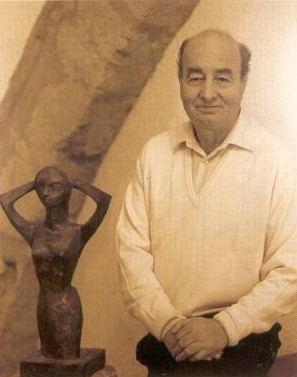
Maties Palau Ferré

Maties Palau Ferré (1921–2000) was a painter from Montblanc, Catalonia, Spain. He made cubist oil paintings, India ink drawings, as well as ceramics and a few sculptures.

He is renowned as the painter who burned his canvases.

== Life and works ==
He studied art in the Reial Acadèmia Catalana de Belles Arts de Sant Jordi, Barcelona. He moved to Paris in 1957. There he became a disciple of Pablo Picasso.

He exposed his artwork in many countries, including Spain, France, the United Kingdom and the United States. His most important works are titled Dona i lluna (woman and moon), Montblanc and Guer-Blanc. He signed his works Palau Ferré.

Palau Ferré was known for his sudden swings of humor and became notorious in 1974 for burning his oil paintings as a protest against the unfavorable resolution of a legal conflict he had with an art dealer. Clamoring against the "prostitution of art", he kept burning all of his paintings he was able to lay his hands on during a period of about twenty years. He used to release the ashes in the Francolí River, but some of the ashes of his oil paintings were kept and displayed in an art exhibition in Pennsylvania, US. Following his protest he stopped painting oils and didn't didn't allow that any of his works in private hands be exhibited until 1989. His last period includes only works made with ink on thick paper, following a technique of his own invention.

After his death on 1 January 2000 in Montblanc, the town hall of his birthplace honored him and named a street after him. The Palau Ferré Art Museum was inaugurated the following year displaying some of the few canvases that survived the destruction inflicted by their author.

== Legacy ==
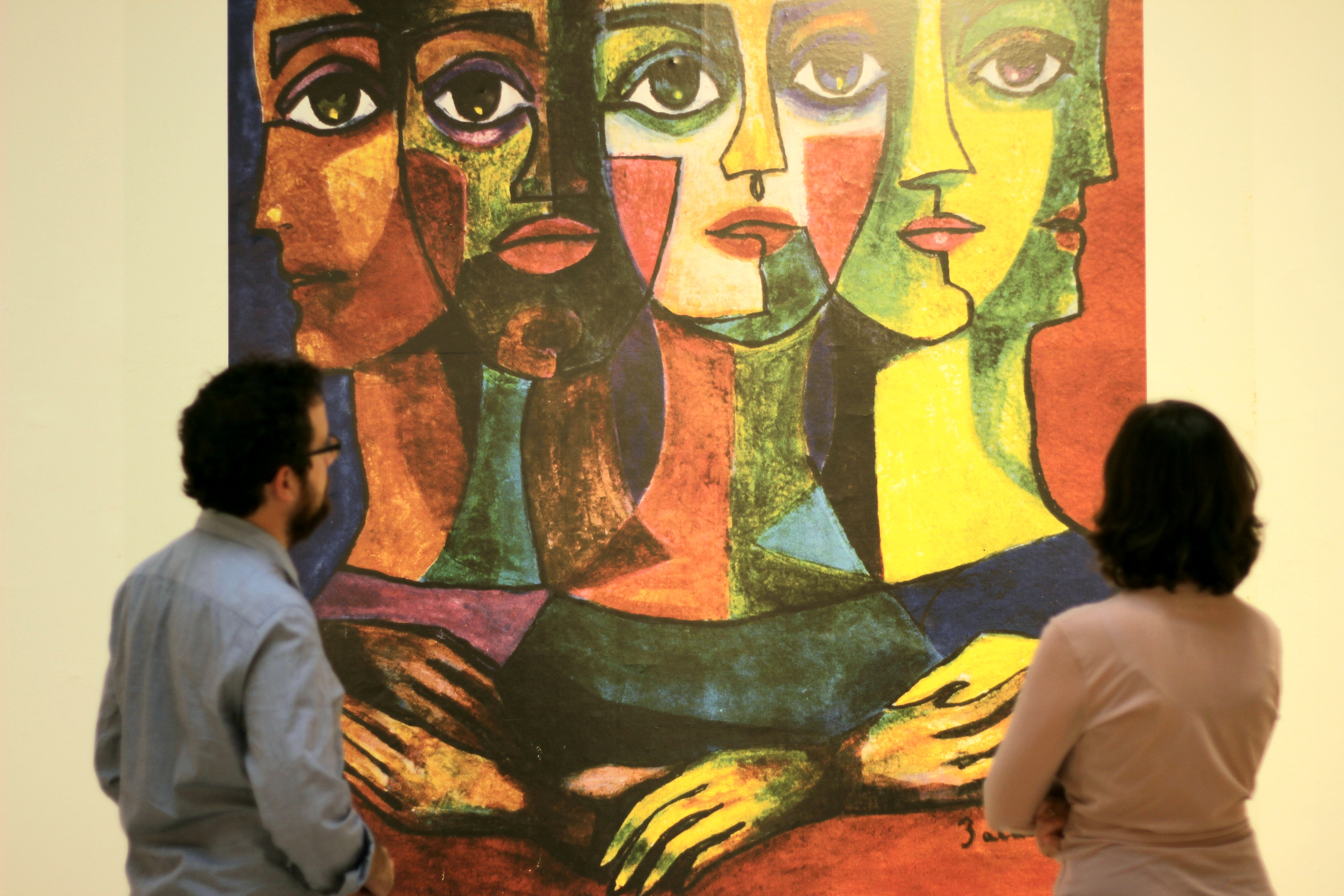
Palau Ferré exposition (Reus, 2020)

In 2011, coinciding with the northern anniversary of his birth, the Museu d'Art Modern de Tarragona (MAMT) organizes a retrospective exhibition and the art critic Antonio Salcedo publishes Palau Ferré i el su paradís.

In 2013, a new exhibition was organized at the Cité Internationale Universitaire de Paris (CIUP) to commemorate the 60 years of the artist's stay and the seva besnedding Rosa de les Neus Marco-Palau publishes the book Palau Ferré retourne a Paris: a journey for the avant-gardes.

In 2019, the historian Francesc Marco-Palau, one of the artists, will publish the biography The painter who cremated his paintings, republished by Editorial Base in 2020, which will mark the beginning of the preparations for the commemoration of the centenary of Palau Ferré.

== Centenary Palau Ferré ==
After an intense effort to recover his figure carried out in 2019 and 2020, the Catalan government declared 2021 the Palau Ferré Year, an official commemoration curated by the historian Francesc Marco-Palau, the painter's great-nephew, to honor the centenary of the artist's birth. Within the framework of the Palau Ferré Year, 20 different thematic exhibitions were organized and 100 territorial actions took place throughout Catalonia, with the support of town halls, museums, libraries, entities and NGOs.

Thus, among others, the Institut français de Barcelona recalled the Parisian years of Palau Ferré; the Cervera Museum and the Cambrils History Museum detailed the artist's friendship with the writer Jaime Ferran; the Institut d'Estudis Ilerdencs links him with the Lleida regions; the Museum of Tárrega, the pictorial archetypes of him; in Igualada, his link with Central Catalonia; in L'Escala, his sardanista inspiration; at the Sarral Town Hall, his friendship with the architect Josep Puig Torné; in the Coastal Dock of the Port of Tarragona, the biographical stages of him; in the Casa de la Paraula of Santa Coloma de Farners his sculptural aspect; the Girona Art Museum, the figures with a single stroke; the Museum of History of Catalonia showed the solidarity posters of the artist; and the Museum of Rural Life the vital essence of it. The closure took place with a retrospective exhibition in the convent of Sant Francesc of Montblanc.

Also within the framework of the commemoration, the Library Service of Catalonia devised an itinerant exhibition of the centenary and, at the same time, several museums began to exhibit works by the artist: the Conca de Barberà Regional Museum, the History Museum of Girona, Museum of Reus, The Museum of Wine Cultures of Catalonia. Vinseum and Museum of Contemporary Art of Vilafamés.

In the same year, 2021, the Little Story of Matias Palau Ferré was presented, a story written by Rosa de las Neus Marco-Palau, the artist's great-niece, with drawings by Pilarín Bayés.

In 2023, the writer Màrius Serra novelized the painter's life in "The Most Painted Woman".
