= Josep Riera i Aragó =

Spanish artist (born 1954)

- Born: 1954 (age 71–72); Barcelona, Spain
- Occupation: Artist

Riera i Aragó was born in Barcelona, Spain in 1954. He studied at the Sant Jordi Fine Arts School, graduating in 1973. Throughout his career he has made sculptures, paintings, and graphical work. His work often depicts machines using recycled bronze and iron. He has had important solo and group exhibitions and is present in several museum collections. In addition, he has made large sculptures for public spaces.

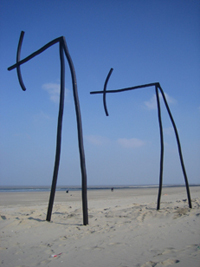

== Museums ==
Musée de Ceret, France- Fundació Joan Miró, Barcelona - Musée d'Art Moderne, Luxembourg – Col•lecció Testimoni - Fundació La Caixa, Barcelona - Fondation Vincent van Gogh, Arles (France) - Städtische Museen, Heilbronn (Germany) - Musée Réattu, Arles (France) - Museum Otani, Nishinomiya (Japan) - Fundació La Caixa of Girona - Collection Cai Luzan, Zaragoza - Col.lecció Institut D'Estudis Catalans, Barcelona - MACBA, Barcelona - Museu d’Història de la Ciutat, Girona - Museu de l'Hospitalet - Collección Rega, Zurich, Switzerland - Fundación Fran Daurel, Barcelona - Musée d'Art moderne André Malraux, Le Havre

== Publications ==
Riera i Aragó, Ediciones Polígrafa, 1991, Text by Gloria Picazo

Riera i Aragó, Editions Cercle d’Art, 1992, Text by Gloria Picazo

Riera i Aragó Iconografia, Ediciones Polígrafa 2003, Text by Valentin Roma
