= Emília Coranty Llurià =

Spanish painter (1862–1944)

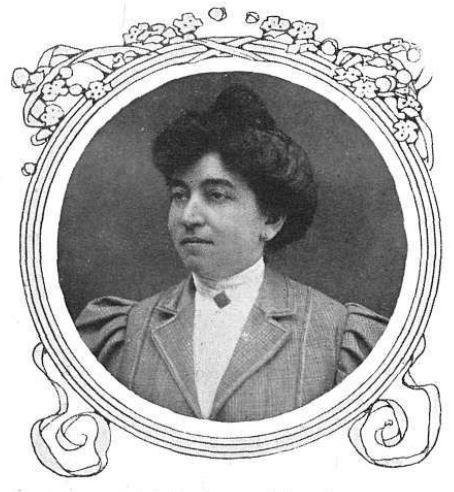
- Born: February 19, 1862; Barcelona
- Alma mater: Reial Acadèmia Catalana de Belles Arts de Sant Jordi
- Spouse(s): Francesc Guasch

Emília Coranty Llurià (after marriage, Emília Coranty de Guasch; February 19, 1862 – February 18, 1944) was a Spanish painter and drawing teacher connected with Barcelona and Valls.

== Biography ==
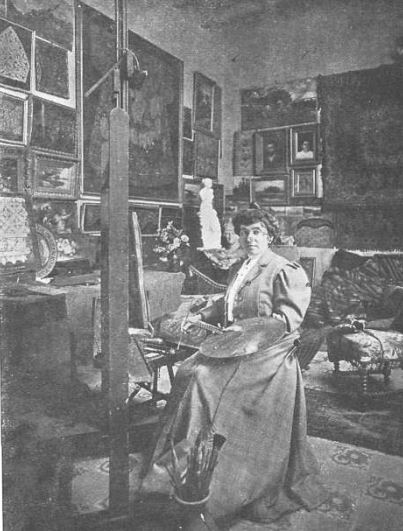
(1908)

Emília Coranty Llurià was born in Barcelona. She acquired artistic training at a drawing school of the Provincial Deputation of Barcelona, at the Escola de la Llotja (1885-1887), and at the Reial Acadèmia Catalana de Belles Arts de Sant Jordi (1886-1888). During a study trip to Rome, she met her future husband, the painter Francesc Guasch (1888-1923). The couple married in 1888, and Emília presented some of her works at the 1888 Barcelona Universal Exposition.

The following year, she moved to Paris, and then went to exhibitions all over the world. In 1893, she was awarded the silver medal, of the women's pavilion at the World's Columbian Exposition in Chicago, where she exhibited alongside Mary Cassatt and Rosa Bonheur. In 1895, she exhibited at the Exposition de Bordeaux (1895).

She served as a teacher at the Escola de la Llotja and campaigned all her life for women to have quality artistic training.

== Death and legacy ==
Emília Coranty Llurià died the day before her 82nd birthday in Barcelona, February 18, 1944, and is buried in the cemetery of Sarrià-Sant Gervasi, alongside her husband.

Her work is held at the Museu Nacional d'Art de Catalunya and at the Museo del Prado.

The Foundation Guasch Coranty, created in Barcelona under Coranty's leadership, continues to be active in the arts.

== Bibliography ==
- Arnáiz, José Manuel; et al. (1998). Cien años de pintura en España y Portugal (1830-1930). Madrid: Antiquaria.
- Fontbona, Francesc (decir) (1999). Repertorio de Catálogos de Exposiciones colectivas de Arte en Cataluña hasta el 1938. Barcelona: Instituto de Estudios Catalanes.
- Garrut, José Maria (1974). Dos siglos de pintura catalana (XIX-XX). Madrid: Ibérico Europea de Ediciones SANO.
- Ibiza y Huesca, Vicent (2006). Obra de mujeres artistas en los museos españoles. Guía de pintoras y escultoras (1500-1936). Valencia: Centro Francisco Tomás y Valiente. UNED (Interciencias, 31).
- Instituto Catalán de las Mujeres. Artistas catalanas del dibujo y la pintura
- Pérez-Nieve, Carmen G. (1964). Galería Universal de Pintoras. Madrid: Editora Nacional. XXV Aniversario de Paz Española.
- Rafols, J.F. (1951). Diccionario biográfico de artistas de Cataluña. 3 vol. Barcelona: Millà.
- Ríos Vernet, Núria (2001) «La Llotja, un espacio para las mujeres?» Revista de Cataluña, nº 158. Nueva etapa (January 2001). Barcelona, pp. 69–90.
- Ventura Solé, Daniel (1985). Francesc Guasch y Homs. Artista pintor (Valls 1861 – Barcelona 1923), Emília Coranty Llurià. Pintora (Barcelona 1862 – 1944). Valls: Gráficas Moncunill.
