= Llotja de Barcelona =

Important building in Barcelona, Catalonia, Spain

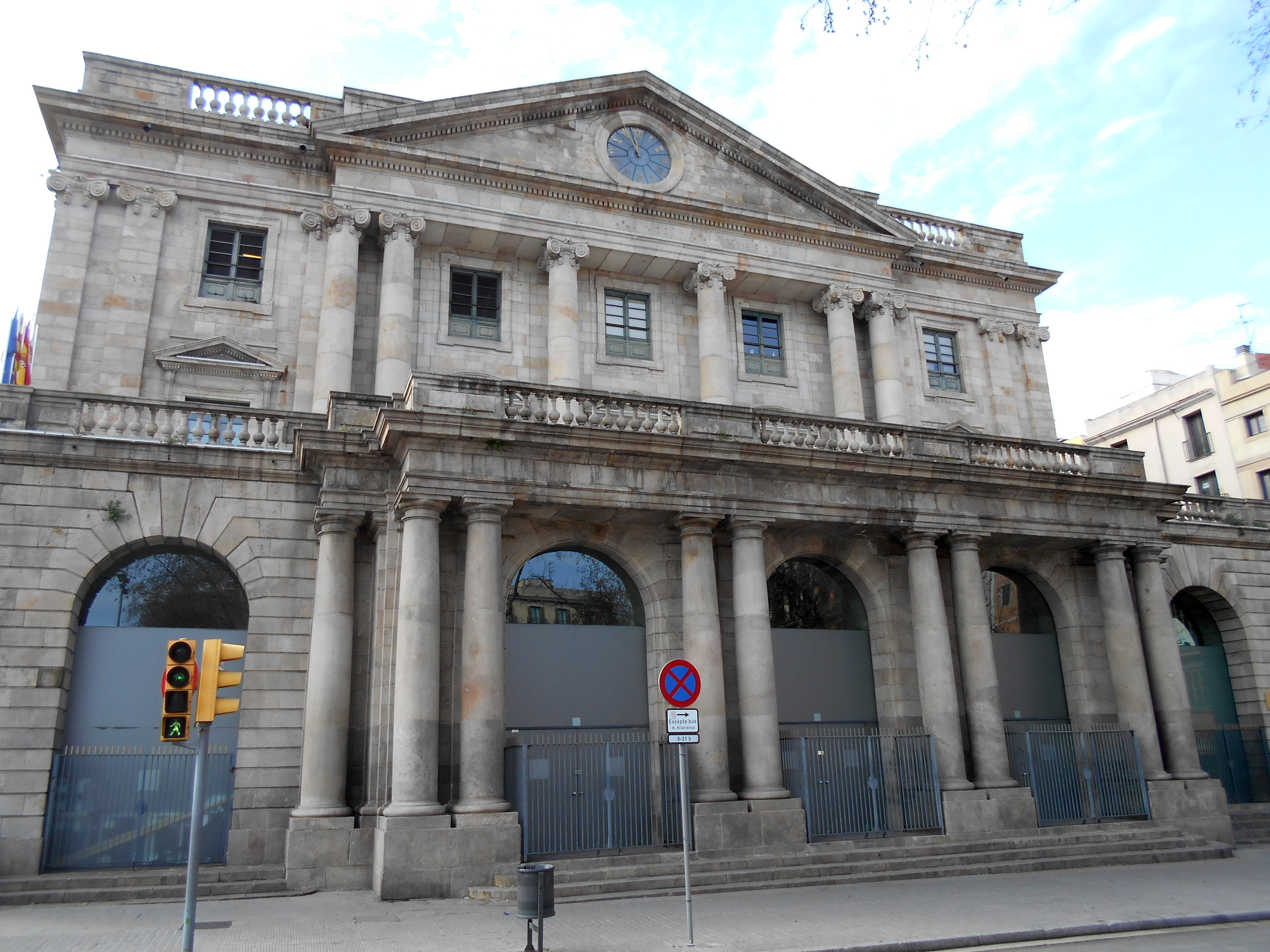
- Palace of the Llotja de Mar
- Interactive map of the Llotja de Barcelona area

General information
- Status: Monument
- Type: Bien de Interés Cultural Patrimonio histórico español
- Architectural style: Gothic and Neoclassical
- Location: Sant Pere, Santa Caterina i la Ribera, Passeig d'Isabel II, 1, Barcelona; Catalonia, Spain
- Coordinates: 41.3822°N 2.1825°E
- Construction started: 14th–15th century
- Construction stopped: 1774–1802
- Owner: Cambra Oficial de Comerç, Indústria i Navegació de Barcelona

Design and construction
- Architects: Pere Arvei and Joan Soler i Faneca
- Known for: Cambra de Comerç de Barcelona, Reial Acadèmia Catalana de Belles Arts de Sant Jordi

Website
- http://www.casallotja.com/

The Llotja de Barcelona or Llotja de Mar (Catalan for Loggia of Barcelona or Sea Loggia) is a building located on Passeig d'Isabel II, in the La Ribera neighbourhood of Barcelona. The current 18th-century neoclassical building is considered one of the finest neoclassical building in Barcelona. Hidden within its walls, is the core of the original medieval llotja known as the saló de Contractacions, one of the finest civil gothic buildings in the Mediterranean. Originally conceived to provide merchants with a place for commercial transactions, it has also been used as a wheat store, an entertainment space, as a weapon magazine, a military barracks and the seat of the Consulate of the Sea and the Royal Barcelona Board of Trade. Today it houses the Cambra de Comerç and the Reial Acadèmia Catalana de Belles Arts de Sant Jordi.

== History ==
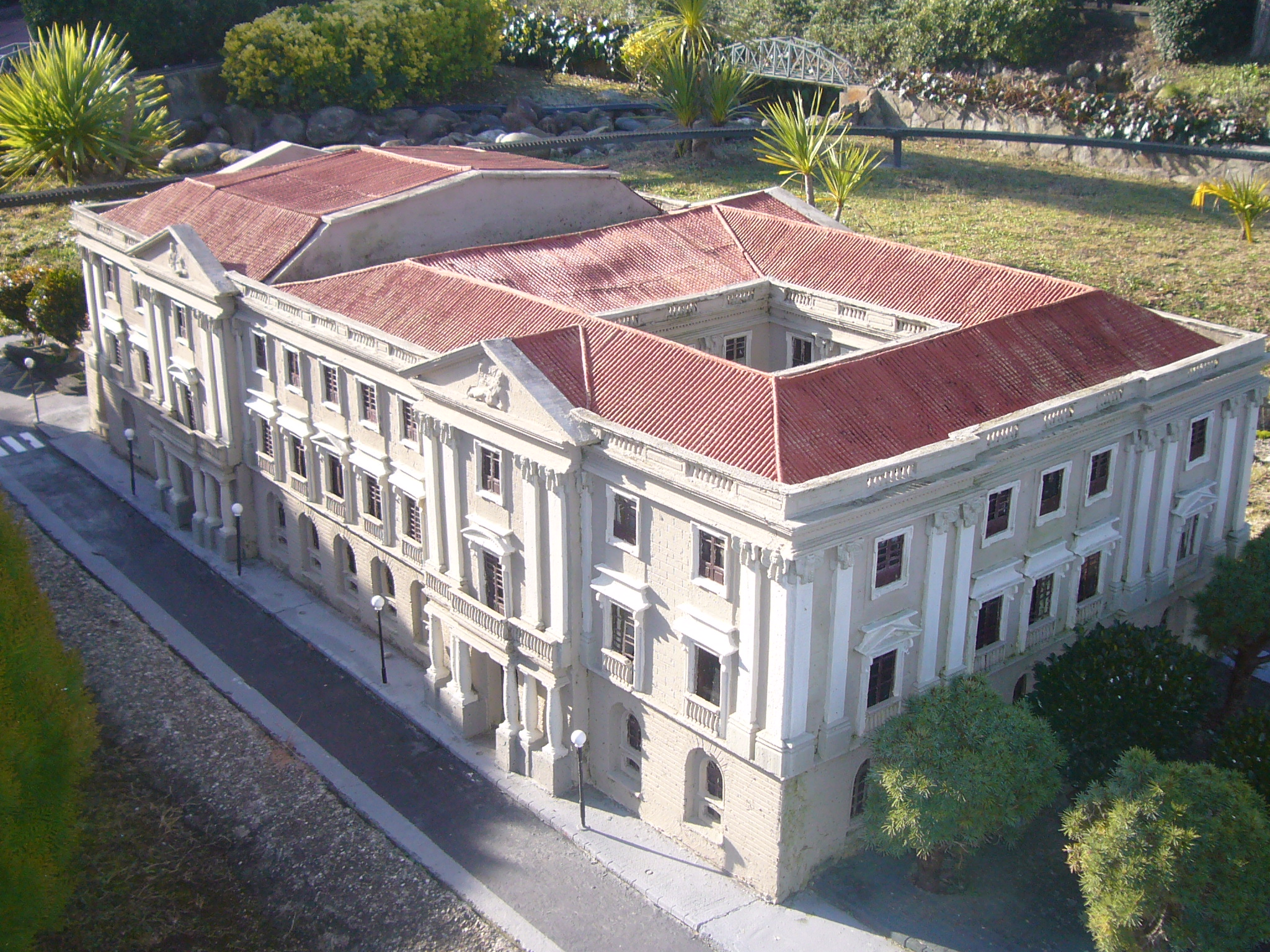
Model of the building in Catalunya en Miniatura.

As commercial activity expanded, Pere Llobet built a porch (or loggia) between 1352 and 1357 practically on the beach near the port, possibly on the location of a previous building used by merchants in what was called plaça dels Canvis lit. 'Money-changers Square', and which had become the centre of maritime activity and adjacent to the Ribera, the most active commercial district in the city. In 1358, a chapel was added.

This construction, which probably remained unfinished, soon became too small and around 1380 Peter the Ceremonious authorised the construction of a large enclosed hall (which still exists), which also protected the merchants from the inclemency of the weather and the effects of the sea. Pere Arvei was the architect in charge of the works, which took place between 1384 and 1397. Although it was in operation by 1397, other constructions were added later, such as a courtyard and small chapel added between 1452 and 1453. Later the upper floor was built 1457–1459 under the direction of Marc Safont as the seat of the Consulate of the Sea.

Over time, the function of the gothic building began to change. It was used as a wheat store, a setting for performances, as a weapon magazine and finally, following the siege of 1714 it became a military barracks.

One such performance was the first Italian opera performed in Spain, on August 2, 1708 of the first Italian opera in Il più bel nome, by the Venetian composer Antonio Caldara. It was performed on the occasion of the marriage of Archduke Charles of Austria and the German princess Elisabeth Christine of Brunswick. The opera was performed again in December 2008 on the 300th anniversary of the original.

In 1767 the building was given to the Royal Barcelona Board of Trade who decided to rebuild in the neoclassical style.

The Board of Trade established many schools with the aim of supporting trade and industry. Among them was the Free School of Design in 1775, which gave rise to the School of Arts and Crafts of Barcelona (Catalan: Escola de la Llotja) and the Reial Acadèmia Catalana de Belles Arts de Sant Jordi, which still uses the upper part to house an important art collection, especially from the 18th and 19th centuries, although the school is no longer located in this building.

In 1915 the Barcelona Stock Exchange was established in the Contracting Hall where it operated until 1994.

The building is currently the seat of the Cambra de Comerç and of the Reial Acadèmia Catalana de Belles Arts de Sant Jordi.

== The current building ==
The building is the most important work of neoclassicism in Barcelona. The facades, the courtyard and the splendid staircase, with a model work of stone stereotomy, particularly stand out. The courtyard and the staircase are decorated with various sculptures: the Fountain of Neptune, by Nicolau Travé, at the foot of which are two nereids by Antoni Solà; in the corners of the courtyard there are four niches with allegories of continents: Europe and Asia, by Josep Bover, and Africa and America, by Manuel Olivé; finally, at the foot of the staircase there are two allegories of Commerce and Industry, by Salvador Gurri.

Some of the rooms on the main floor maintain the 18th century decoration and display numerous works of art. Among them, in the Saló Daurat (Golden Hall), the sculpture Lucrecia, by Damià Campeny, one of the great works of European neoclassical sculpture.

The building was constructed between 1774 and 1802 initially by Joan Soler i Faneca and later by the architects Tomàs Soler i Ferrer —son of Soler Faneca— and Joan Fàbregas. The building has a height of 22 meters and its facades are topped by 4 pediments whose importance is demonstrated by its location, opposite the Palace of the Viceroy and to its side, the sea wall and its gate called the Portal de Mar (long before Passeig d'Isabel II was built).

== The gothic building ==
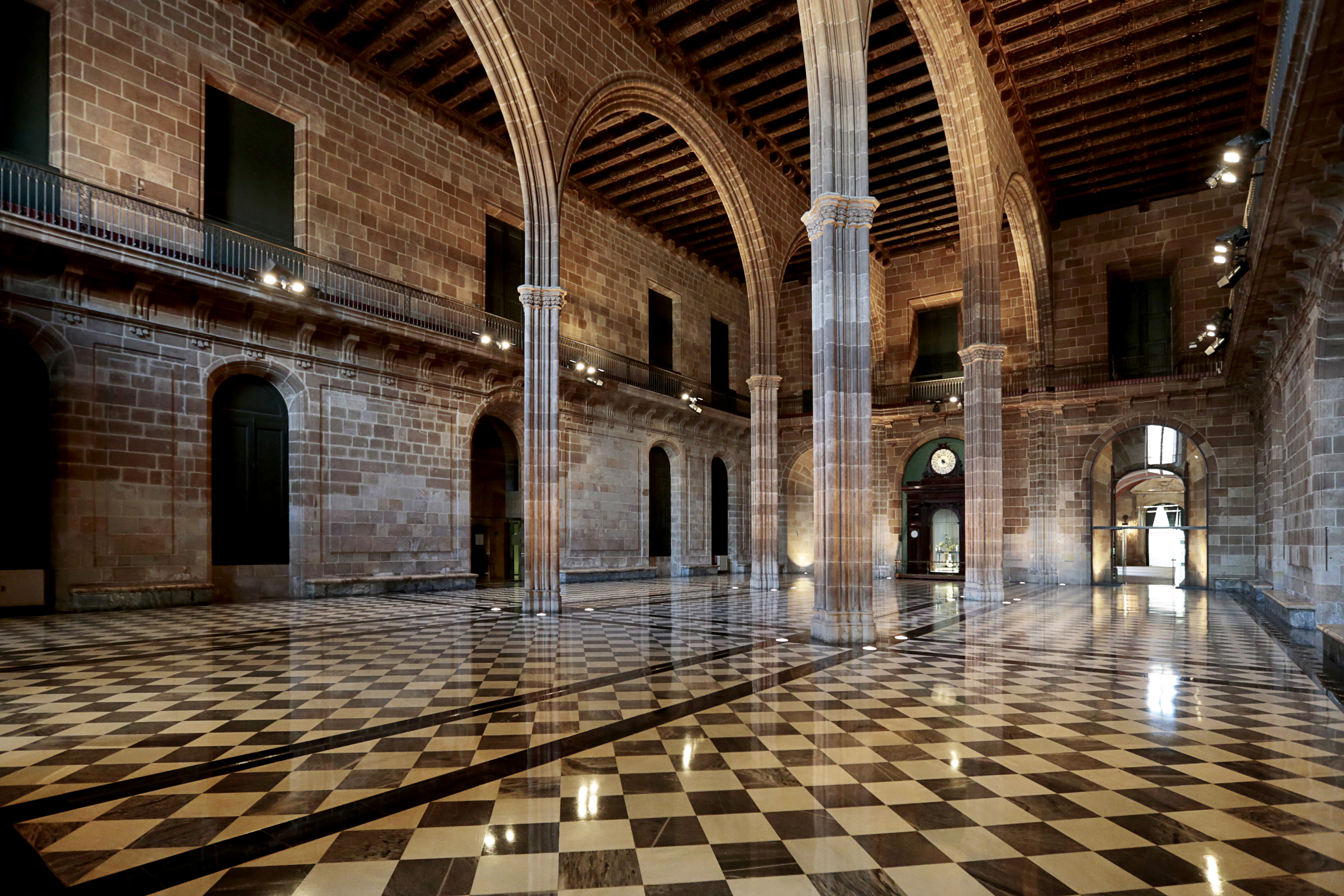
The gothic Contracting Hall now hidden within the neoclassical building

The gothic Llotja de Barcelona can be considered the first mature example in the Crown of Aragon of a type of architecture that became common for mercantile activity and is more elaborate in design than any other contemporary (late 14th century) such building. It was probably inspired by similar buildings in Italy and the Low Countries, where civil power and commerce were also on the rise and reflects the growing power of the merchants in Barcelona.

The heart of that building survives and is completely enclosed by the neoclassical building. It consists of the Contracting Hall (Catalan: Saló de Contractacions) and the Consuls Hall (Catalan: Saló dels Cònsols above it. The Contracting Hall is 14 meters high, with three naves separated by semicircular arcades with 4 columns and 6 arches that support the wooden ceiling and the upper floor. On the spandrels of the arches, you can see the coats of arms of the king and the city alternating since the construction of the building was promoted by Peter IV of Aragon and the Consell de Cent.

Between 2000 and 2001 archaeological investigations discovered the original 14th century stone slab pavement of the lower hall.

== Image gallery ==
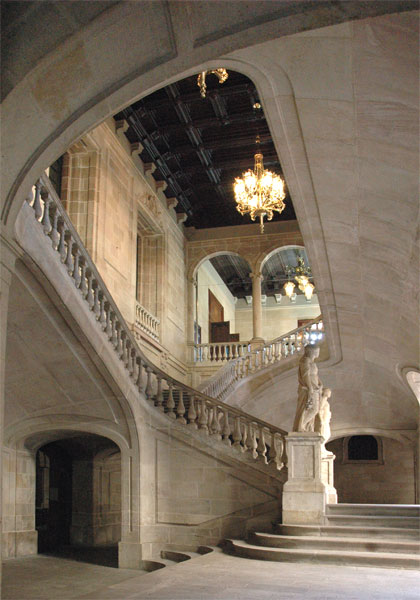
Neoclassic staircase.

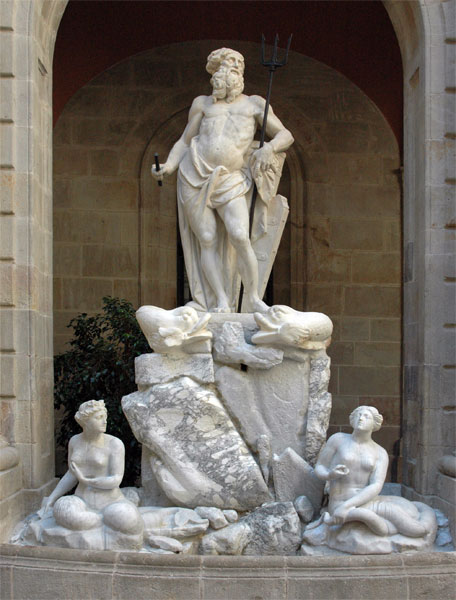
Fountain of Neptune

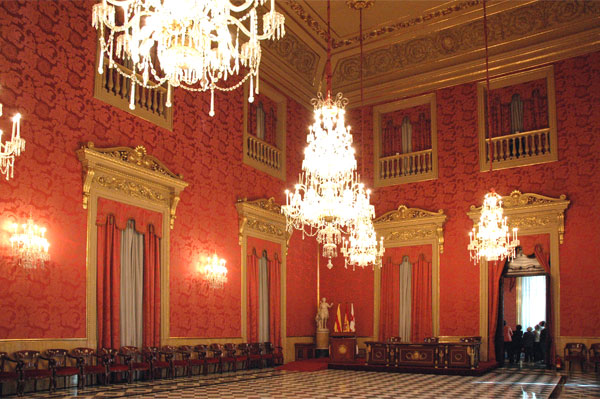
Saló Daurat

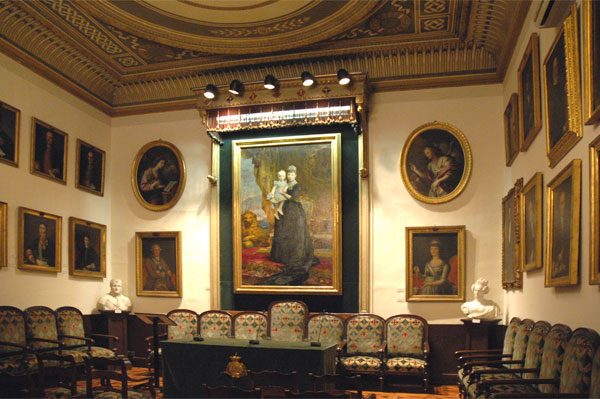
Reial Acadèmia Catalana de Belles Arts de Sant Jordi

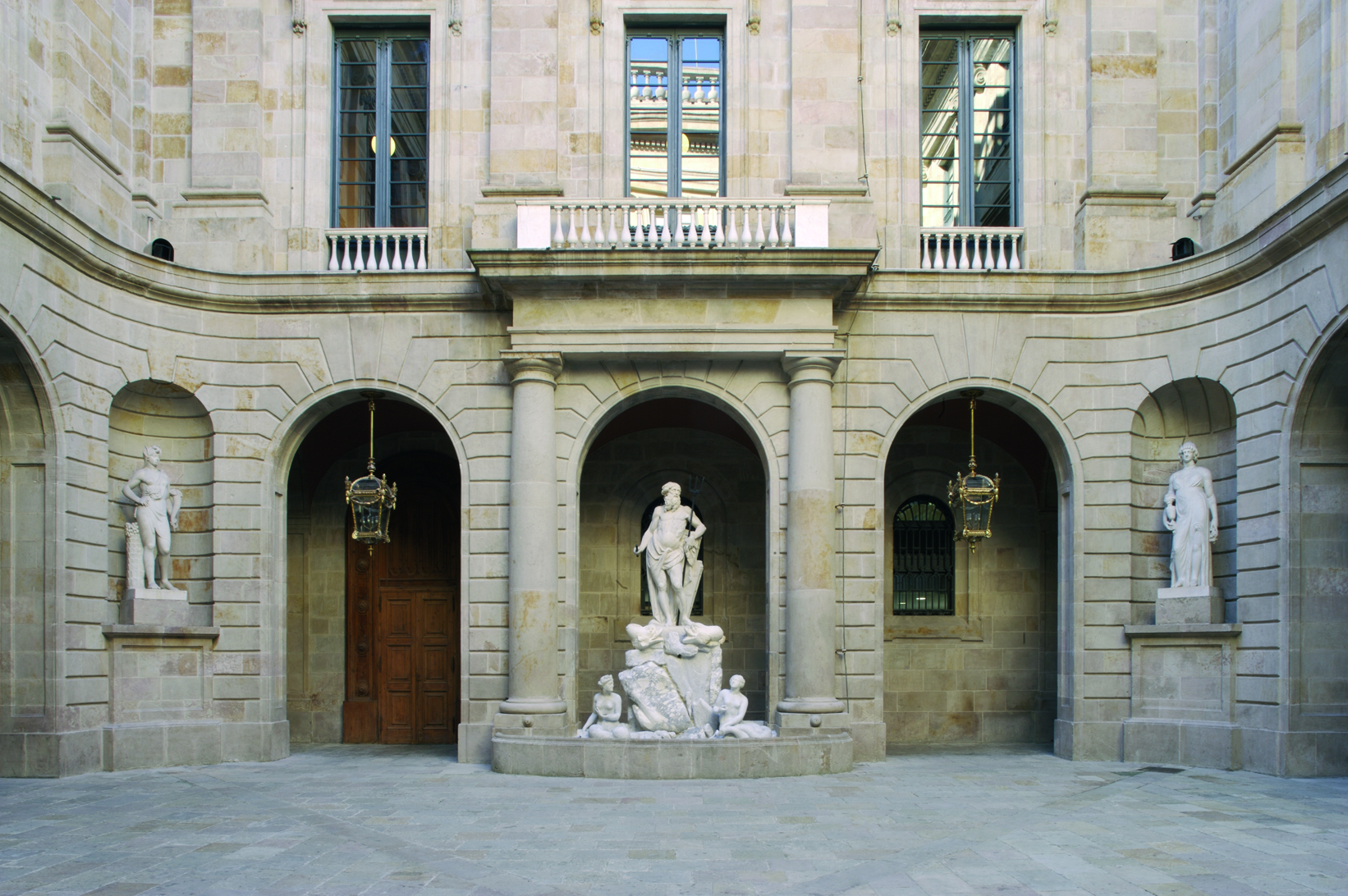
Neoclassical courtyard with Fountain of Neptune

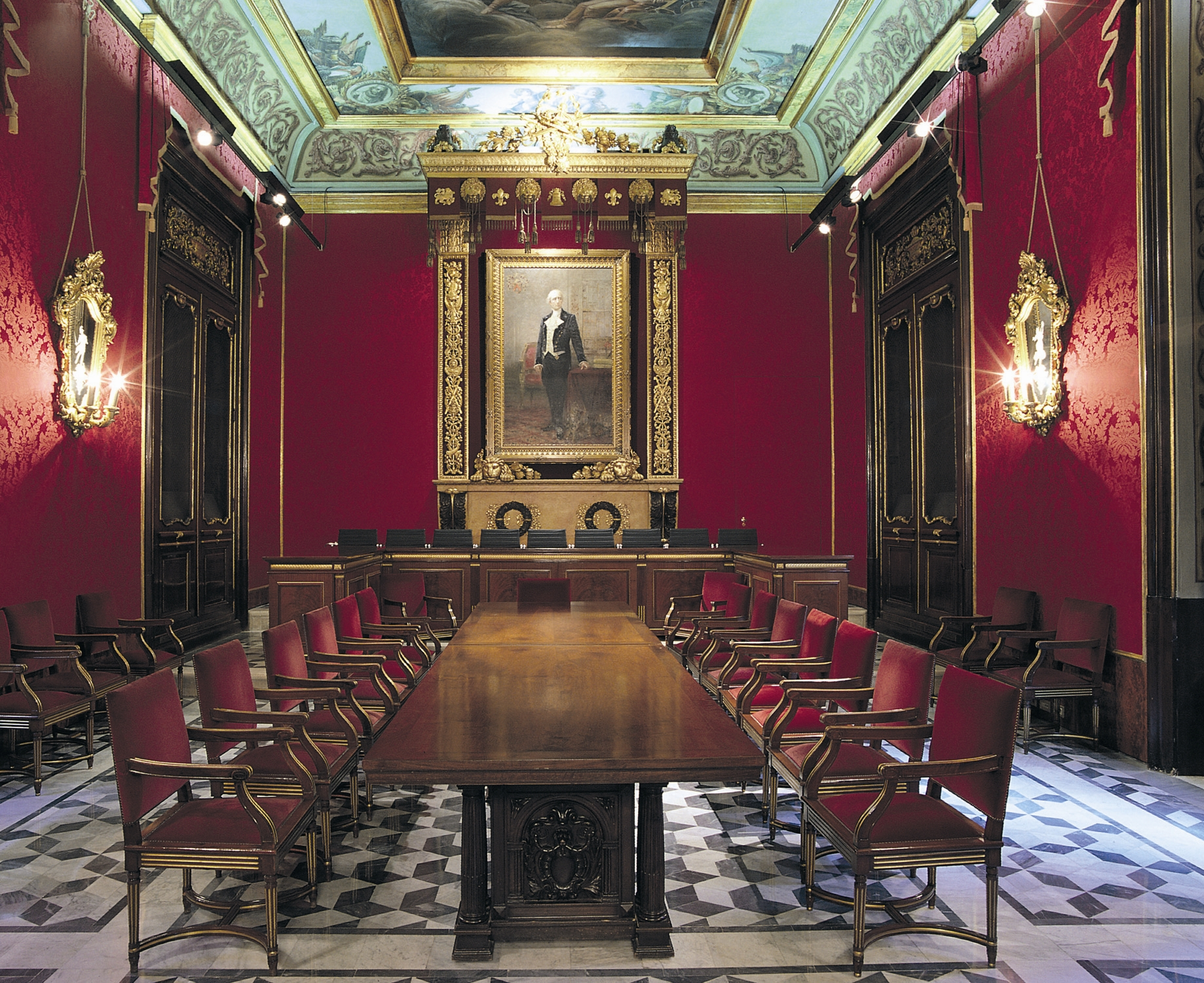
Hall of the Tribunal of the Consulate of the Sea

== See also ==
- Architecture of Barcelona
- List of Bienes de Interés Cultural in the Province of Barcelona
- Llotja de la Seda

== Bibliography ==
- Bernaus i Vidal, Magda; Caballé i Crivillés, Gemma (2003). "De llotja de mercaders a caserna militar: La Llotja de Barcelona a l'època moderna". Revista d'història moderna (in Catalan) (23). Pedralbes: 781.
- Bernaus i Vidal, Magda (2003). La Llotja de Barcelona. L’art gòtic a Catalunya. Arquitectura II-3 (in Catalan). Barcelona: Enciclopèdia Catalana.
- Fabre, Jaume; Huertas, Josep M.; Bohigas, Pere (1984). Monuments de Barcelona (in Catalan). Barcelona: L'Avenç. ISBN 84-85905-21-0.
- Lara Ortega, Salvador (2007). Las seis grandes lonjas de la Corona de Aragón (in Spanish). Valencia: General de Ediciones de Arquitectura. ISBN 978-84-935163-6-9.
- Solé, Marta (February 2013). "La nostra primera òpera" [Our first opera]. Sàpiens (in Catalan). No. 126. Barcelona: Grup Cultura 03. p. 16. ISSN 1695-2014.
- Direcció General del Patrimoni Cultural de la Generalitat de Catalunya (ed.). "Llotja de Mar". Inventari del Patrimoni Arquitectònic (in Catalan).
