= Ramon Vives Ayné =

Spanish painter

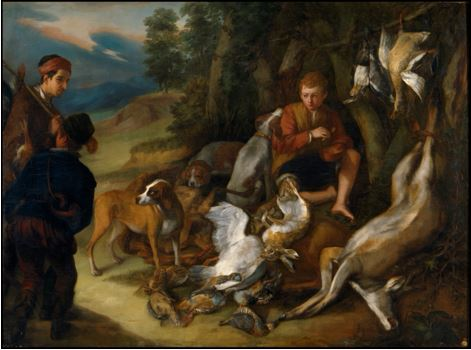
Dead Game in a Landscape

Ramon Vives Ayné (6 December 1814, Reus - 10 October 1894, Pontevedra) was a Catalan painter. He was especially known for still-lifes, portraits and hunting scenes. Most of his work was in a naturalistic style. Some sources give his year of death as 1904.

== Biography ==
At the age of seventeen, he became a student at the Escola de la Llotja in Barcelona. Two years later, he transferred to the Real Academia de Bellas Artes de San Fernando in Madrid.

In 1866, he was appointed to the chair of drawing at the Institute of Pontevedra. He became an Academician in 1870. After his retirement, in 1879, he devoted himself to painting historical scenes. He remained in Pontevedra until his death. He held frequent exhibits locally and in Madrid, where he was named Honorary President of the Liceo Artístico.

Among his best known portraits were those of Queen Christina, the painter, Lluís Rigalt, which is on display at the Acadèmia de Sant Jordi de Barcelona, and King Alfonso XII, which was at the Museo del Prado until 1915, when it was destroyed in a fire.
