= Pau Rigalt =

Pau Rigalt i Fargas (Spanish: Pablo Rigalt y Fargas; 1778, Barcelona – 1845, Barcelona) was a Catalan painter and scenographer. He was one of the pioneers of Neoclassicism in Catalonia.

== Biography ==
He trained at the Escola de la Llotja with Pere Pau Montaña i Placeta and Joseph Flaugier. Later, he completed his training in Madrid. During the Peninsular War, he lived in Vilanova i la Geltrú, where he performed decorative work at several homes; notably one belonging to the Llopis de Sitges family, which has since become the Can Llopis Romanticism Museum. He also decorated the interiors of the Casa del Poeta Cabanyes.

In 1816, back in Barcelona, he began working at the Teatre de la Santa Creu, where he had been appointed Director of decorations and stage machinery. In 1821, he left Barcelona again, due to an epidemic of yellow fever, went to Manlleu, and painted some sets for a theater in Torelló. In 1825, he was named to replace Bonaventura Planella as a professor of drawing at La Llotja. He was also commissioned to decorate the school building.

A few of his works may be seen at the Museu Nacional d'Art de Catalunya. Some drawings are in the collection of the art critic Raimon Casellas.

His son, Lluís Rigalt, also became a well-known painter.

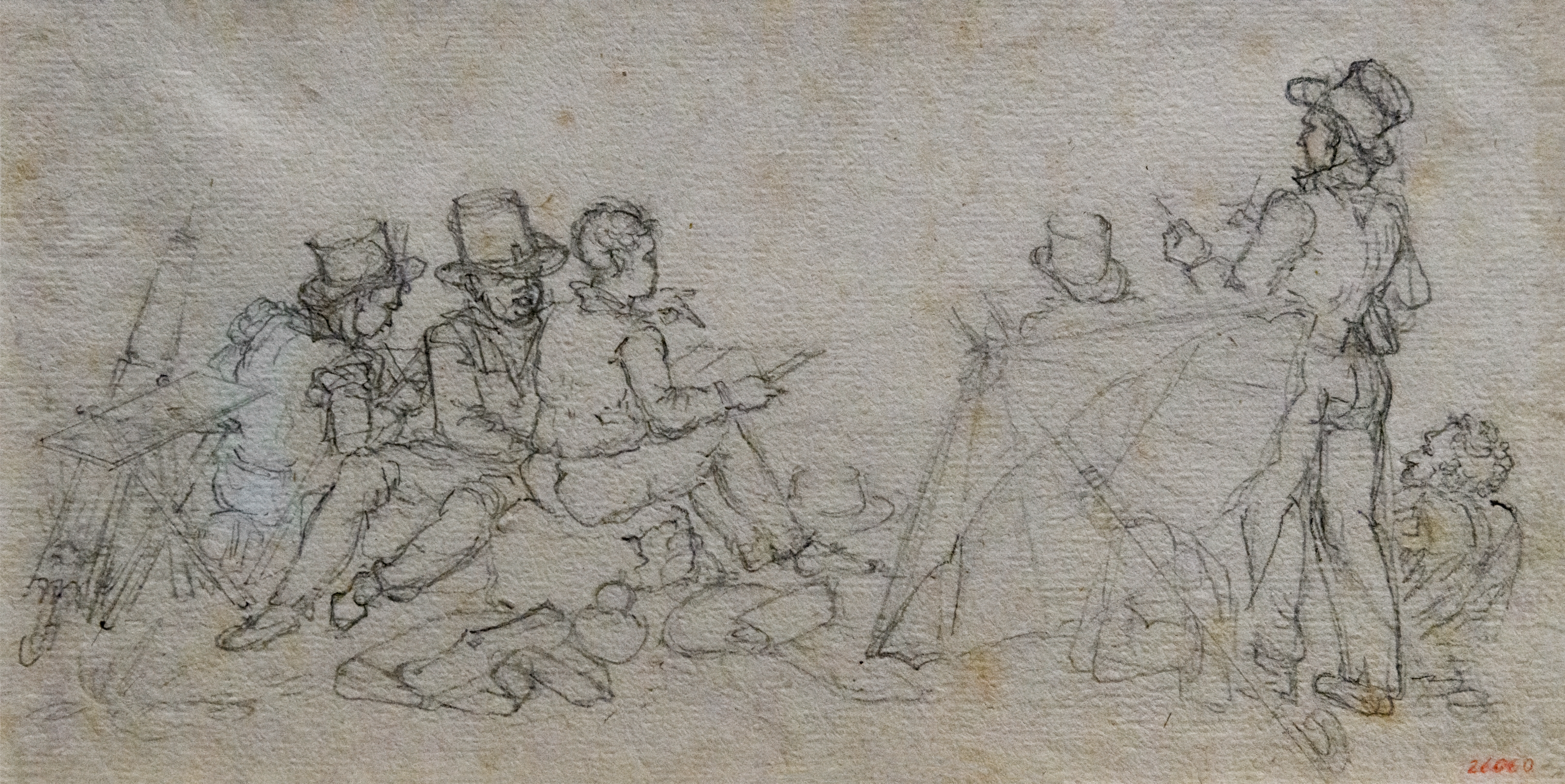
Group of draftsmen and topographers, Museu Nacional d'Art de Catalunya

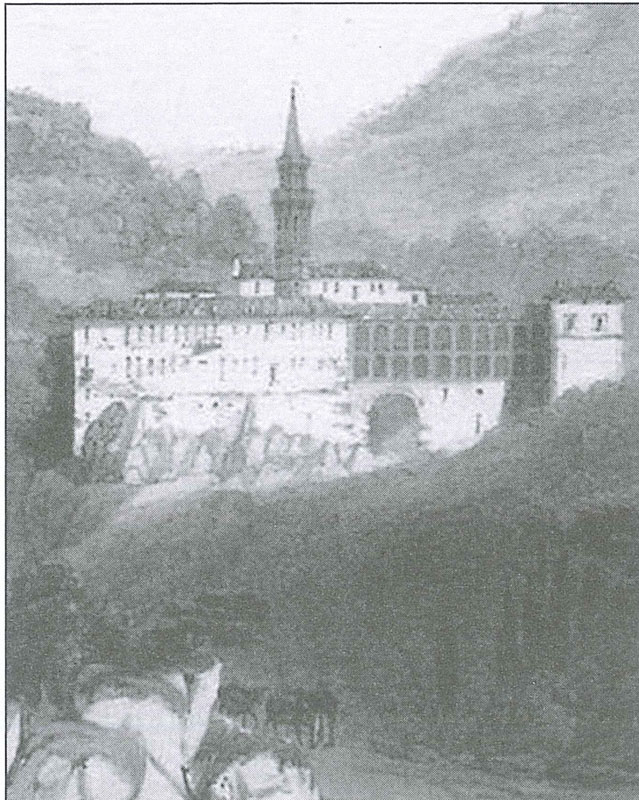
Sant Jeroni de la Vall d'Hebron, Museu Nacional d'Art de Catalunya

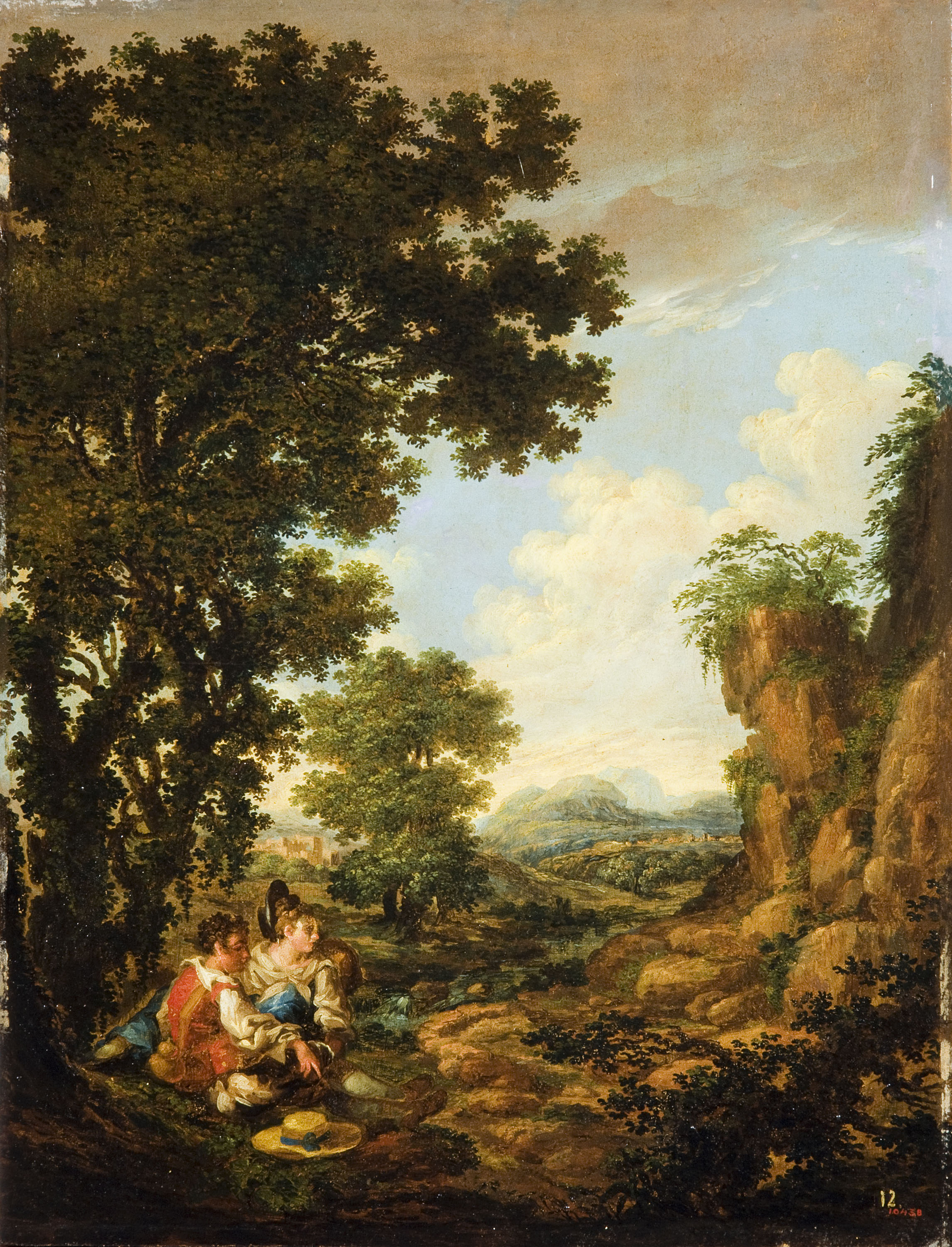
Pastoral
