= Maria Angels Vallvé =

- Born: 1942 (age 83–84); Barcelona, Spain
- Other names: Mari Àngels Vallvé
- Occupations: stockbroker and notary
- Known for: first woman stockbroker in Spain
- Spouse: Joan Hortalà Arau
- Children: 5

Maria Àngels Vallvé Ribera (born 1942) is a former Spanish stockbroker and Catalan notary. She is known for being the first ever woman stockbroker in Spain, in 1971, and founder of the stock exchange company GVC in 1986.

== Early life and education ==
Born in Barcelona in 1942, she holds a degree in Economics and Law from the University of Barcelona. She is the daughter of the industrial engineer, entrepreneur and cultural promoter Joan Vallvé i Creus and Mercè Ribera Rovira.

== Career ==
She became the first event woman stockbroker agent in Spain, getting her license in 1971. After her degree in Economics and Law, she specialized as an insurance actuary and financial analyst.

Once the Stock Market Reform Law was approved in 1989, she worked as a trading broker and, from 2000 until 2012, as a notary in Barcelona. In 1986 she was a founding partner of GVC, an investment services company dedicated to stock and asset management. In 2007 GVC bought the company Gaesco.

She was one of the first ten women who, in 2001, applied to join the Cercle del Liceu in Barcelona, then a male-only organization. She finally became part of its governing board. In 2009, she became part of the board of directors of the Orfeó Català, together with Leopoldo Rodés and Ignasi García Nieto. She retired as notary in 2012.

== Personal life ==
She is married to economic theory professor, economist and politician Joan Hortalà Arau, and is mother of five children: Joan, Carme, Mercè, Rafael and Joaquim.
