= Güell Foundation =

Spanish organization for artists

The Güell Foundation is a non-profit organization for artists in Catalonia, Spain, created in August 1957 by Joan Antoni Güell i López, Count of Güell. Since the beginning its main aim has been to protect financially through grants painters, sculptors, musicians and other artists and students of art, mainly Catalan, being able to extend this to other artists in Valencia and the Balearic Islands.

The foundation has also participated in other artistic activities, has collaborated with museums and art institutions, and a fund of art. The main activity that has been developing the foundation, which has concentrated most of its economic performance, has been granting scholarships to young artists and students of art, currently granting scholarships in the fields of music, painting, sculpture and drawing.

Note that this is the work carried out with the full support of the members who make up the board, both institutional and private. The institutional board members are prestigious organizations: the Catalan Royal Academy of Fine Arts of Sant Jordi, the Royal Artistic Circle-Barcelona Institute of Art, the Art Circle of St. Luke and the Orfeo Catalan.

Each year a scholarship is given to a candidate in each category convened, as the selection of the jury agrees. It's intended to be a recognition of the effort and study, and a grant to start developing their vocation.

== Awarded Artists by the Foundation from 1974 to 2000 ==
- 1974 - Painting : Alfonso Costa Beiro, Luis Fraile, Antonio Alegre Cremades, Bayod Serafini
- 1975 - Music : Francesc Civil, Josep Valls
- 1976 - Music : Josep Valls Royo
- 1980 - Music : Josep M. Vaqué Vidal
- 1982 - Painting : Romà Panadès Anton, Music : Jordi Camell Ilari
- 1983 - Sculpture : Alicia Alegre
- 1984 - Painting : Leticia Feduchi, Music : Nuria Cullell Ramis
- 1985 - Sculpture : Jaime de Córdoba
- 1986 - Painting : Jordi Isern, Music : Maria Antonia Juan Nebot
- 1987 - Sculpture : Josep Ignasi Alegre Barenys
- 1988 - Painting : Jose Maria Lojo Mestre, Music : Josep M. Vila i Torrens
- 1989 - Sculpture : Teresa Riba Tomàs
- 1990 - Music : Jordi Rife Santaló, Painting : Neus Martin Royo
- 1991 - Sculpture : Albert Vall Martinez
- 1992 - Painting : Monica Castanys Font, Music : Francesc Puig Forcada
- 1993 - Sculpture : Judith Corominas Ayala, Painting : Eulalia Borrut Cases
- 1994 - Music : Isabel Maynes i Miracle, Sculpture : Silvia Vilaseca Vilaseca
- 1995 - Painting : Maria del Mar Saiz Ardanaz, Sculpture : Mercè Bessó Carreras
- 1996- Engraving : Jesus Francisco Cortaguera, Painting : Hugo Bustamante Isla, Sculpture : Rebeca Muñoz Carrilero
- 1997 - Painting : Marta Lafuente i Cuenca
- 1998 - Sculpture : Jordi Egea Izquierdo
- 1999 - Painting : Laura Badell Giralt
- 2000 - Sculpture : Rosa M. Bessó Carreras

== Bibliography ==
Gary Wray McDonogh. Good Families of Barcelona: A Social History of Power in the Industrial Era. Princeton University Press 1986

== External links and references ==
- Oficial Web Site of the Güell Foundation
- Saint George Royal Catalan Academy of Fine Arts
