= Agapit Vallmitjana i Barbany =

Spanish sculptor

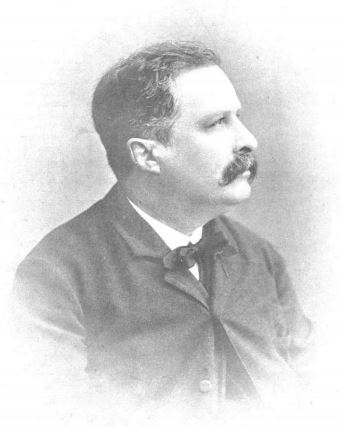
- Born: Agapit Vallmitjana i Barbany; 24 March 1832; Barcelona, Catalonia, Spain
- Died: 25 November 1905 (aged 73); Barcelona, Catalonia, Spain
- Known for: Sculpture
- Movement: Realism

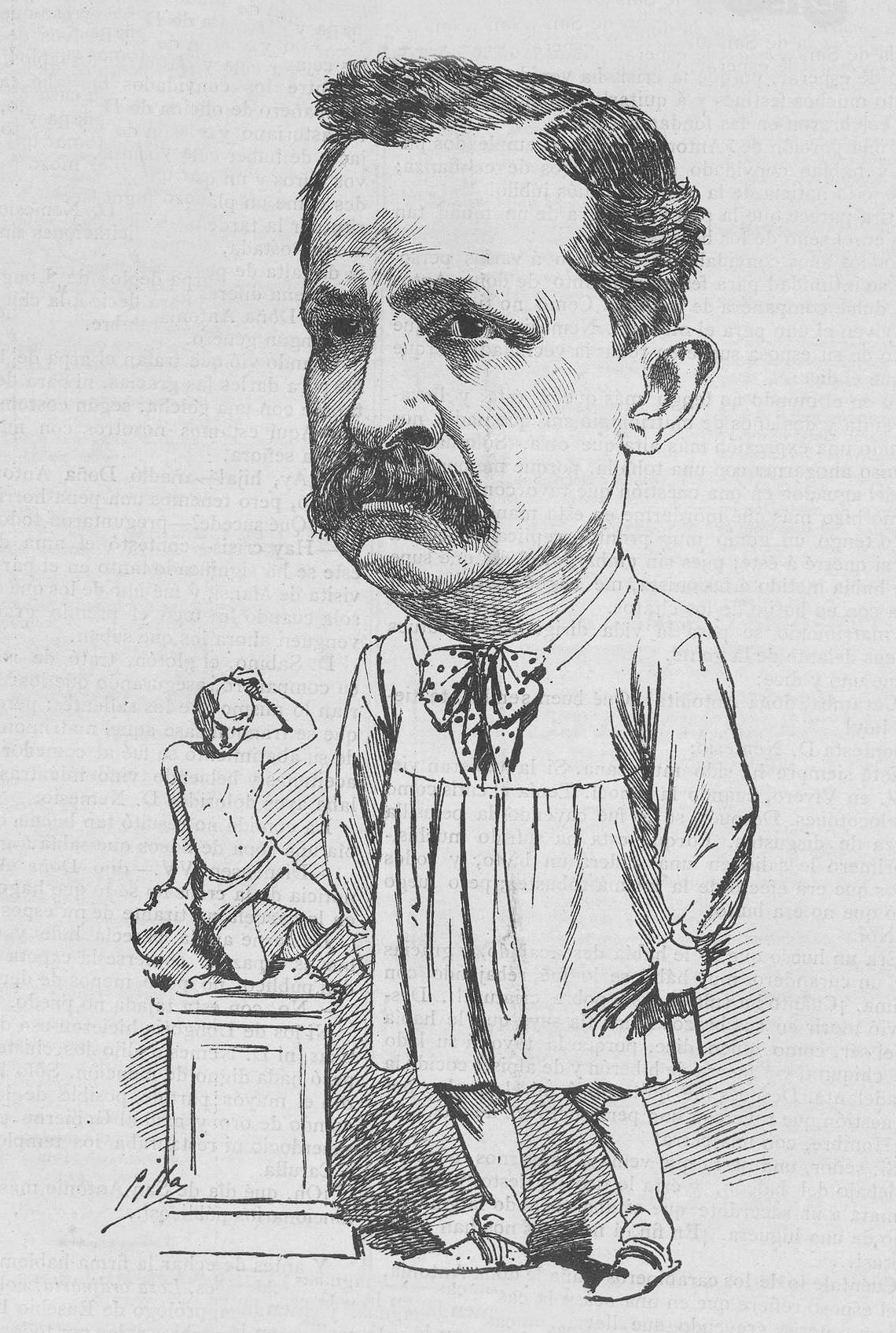
Agapit Vallmitjana i Barbany; portrait by Ramón Cilla (1888)

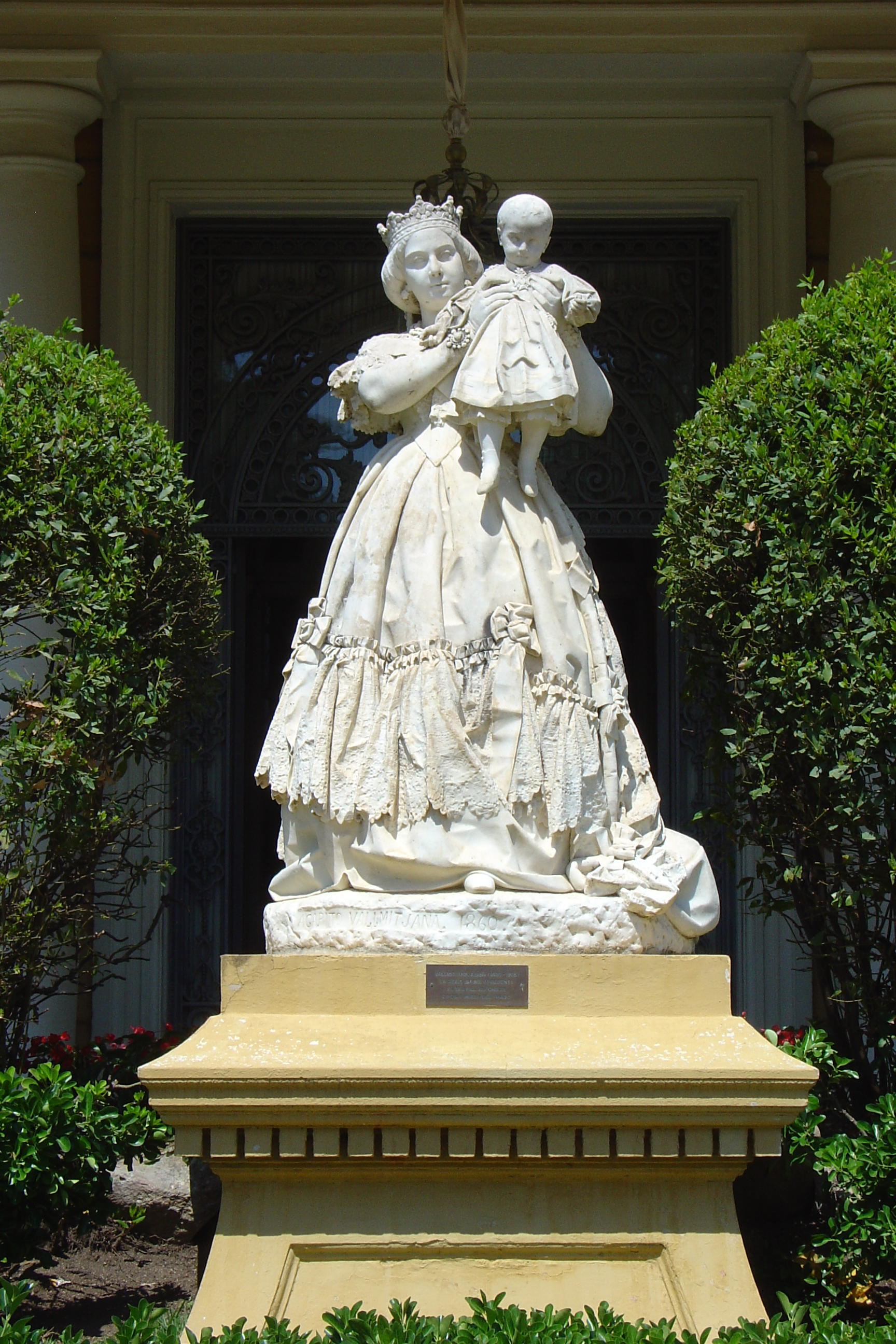
Queen Isabel II Presents her Son

Agapit Vallmitjana i Barbany (24 March 1832, Barcelona – 25 November 1905, Barcelona) was a Catalan sculptor, in the Realist style. His brother Venanci Vallmitjana was also a sculptor, with whom he usually collaborated.

== Biography ==
His father, Felip Vallmitjana, was a weaver. He and his brother began by modeling manger figures and carnival masks after finishing their day in the workshop. After their father showed their work to some local artists, two of them, Pau Xacó (a sculptor), and Sebastià Gallès i Pujal (1812–1902, a painter), insisted that they enroll in classes at the Escola de la Llotja. Agapit attended the courses for 1849–1850. While Venanci focused on sculpture, Agapit also took courses in anatomy, art theory and art history. They were both mentored by the famous sculptor, Damià Campeny. Although he influenced their style, once they had graduated they began to diverge from his Neoclassical guidelines.

They opened a workshop in Barcelona and created numerous works for public spaces and were named Knights in the Order of Isabella the Catholic. When they received a large commission for work at the University of Barcelona, they moved their studio there. During these years, they also participated in several international exhibitions and received a major award at the 1873 Vienna World's Fair. In 1877, they were elected to the Real Academia de Bellas Artes de San Fernando. From 1876 to 1880, Agapit was an Acting Professor of sculpture at the Escola de la Llotja, then became a full-time Professor, by royal order in 1881, and held that post until his death. Eventually, in 1883, they established separate studios.

Young students were always welcome at the workshop. Two of their earliest students were Jeronimo Suñol and Rossend Nobas. Later, they were mentors to Joan Flotats i Llucià and Rafael Atché, among others, including Venanci's son, Agapit Vallmitjana i Abarca.

In addition to his post at the Escola, he was a member of the Reial Acadèmia Catalana de Belles Arts de Sant Jordi. As a teacher, he was a mentor to many well known sculptors; most notably the Modernist sculptor, Pablo Gargallo. In his later years, he continued to create sculptures in public spaces, but was also much in demand for his funerary statues and portraits.

== Works ==
- Jaume I, Valencia.
