= Monument to James I (Valencia) =

Monument in Spain

Jaume I
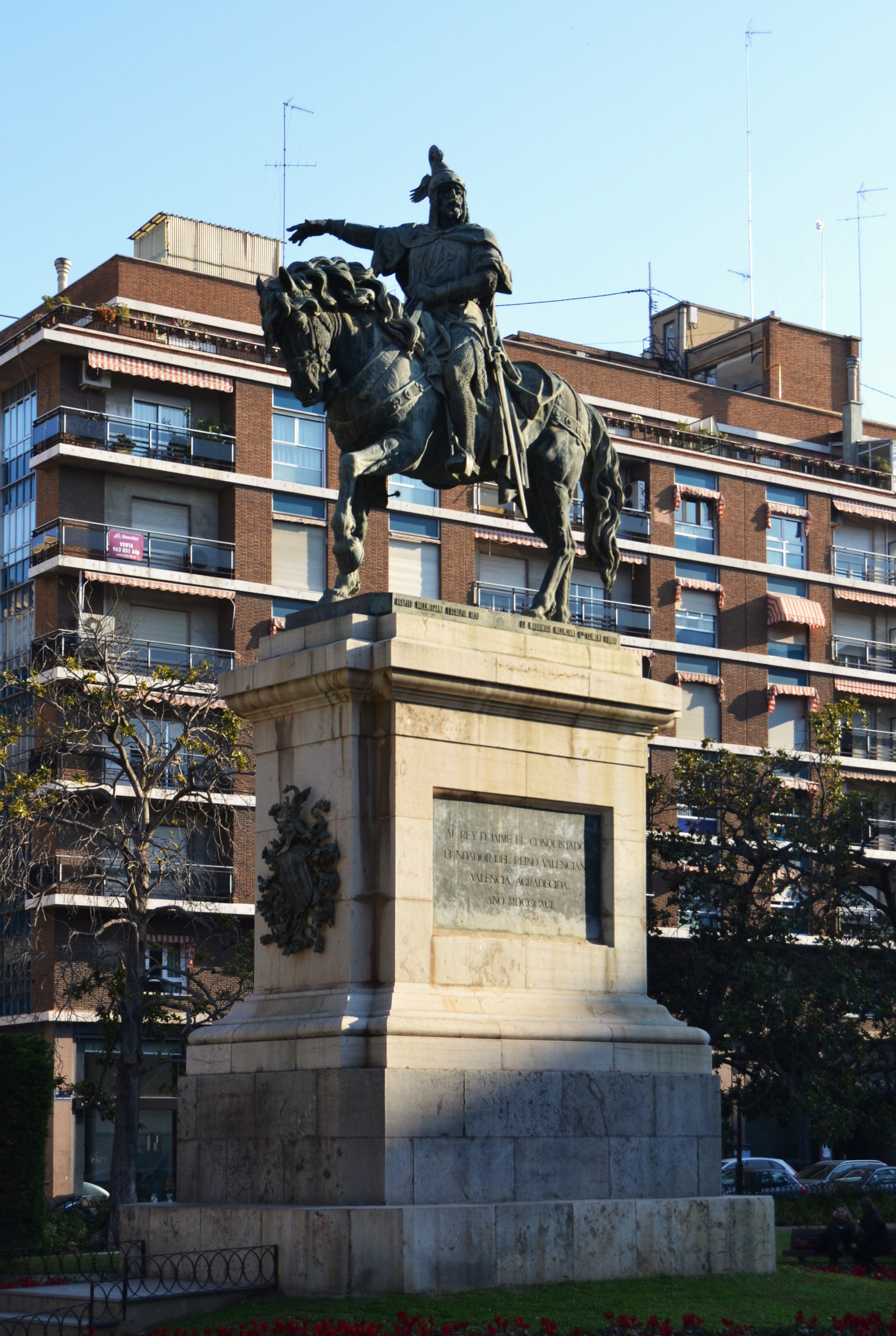
- Interactive map of Jaume I
- Location: El Parterre, Valencia, Spain
- Coordinates: 39.471886°N 0.370585°W
- Designer: Agapito Vallmitjana (statue); Constantino Marzo (pedestal)
- Height: 5.20 m (statue)
- Weight: 11.5 tonnes (statue)
- Opening date: 20 July 1891
- Dedicated to: James I of Aragon

Jaume I (Spanish: Jaime I) or the Monument to James I is an instance of public art in Valencia, Spain. The monument is topped by an equestrian bronze statue representing James I of Aragon, conqueror of Valencia in 1238 and founder of the Kingdom of Valencia.

== History and description ==
The project for the monument was lobbied in 1875 by a group of people associated to Las Provincias, on the occasion of the upcoming 600th anniversary of the death of James I in 1276, and then assumed by the Ayuntamiento, setting a managing junta for the project.

Entrusted to the municipal architect Constantino Marzo, works in the 7.5 m high pedestal took place in 1878. In October 1882 the design of the equestrian statue was awarded to the Vallmitjana brothers from Barcelona, Venancio and Agapito, although the former renounced, leaving only Agapito. The wood model of the statue was delivered in 1886, and moved from Barcelona to Valencia in pieces. The bronze employed for the 5.20 m high statue, was obtained from unused cannons from the Castle of Peñíscola provided by the Ministry of War. The monument was unveiled on 20 July 1891.

The two Spanish-language lateral inscriptions on the pedestal read: "entró vencedor en valencia, liberándola del yugo musulmán, el día de San Dionisio, IX octubre de MCCXXXVIII" ("[he] entered victorious in Valencia, liberating it from the muslim yoke, on the day of St. Dionysius, 9 October 1238") and "al rey don jaime el conquistador, fundador del reino valenciano, valencia agradecida. año MDCCCXCI" ("to King Don Jaime the Conqueror, founder of the Kingdom of Valencia, Valencia grateful. Year 1891").

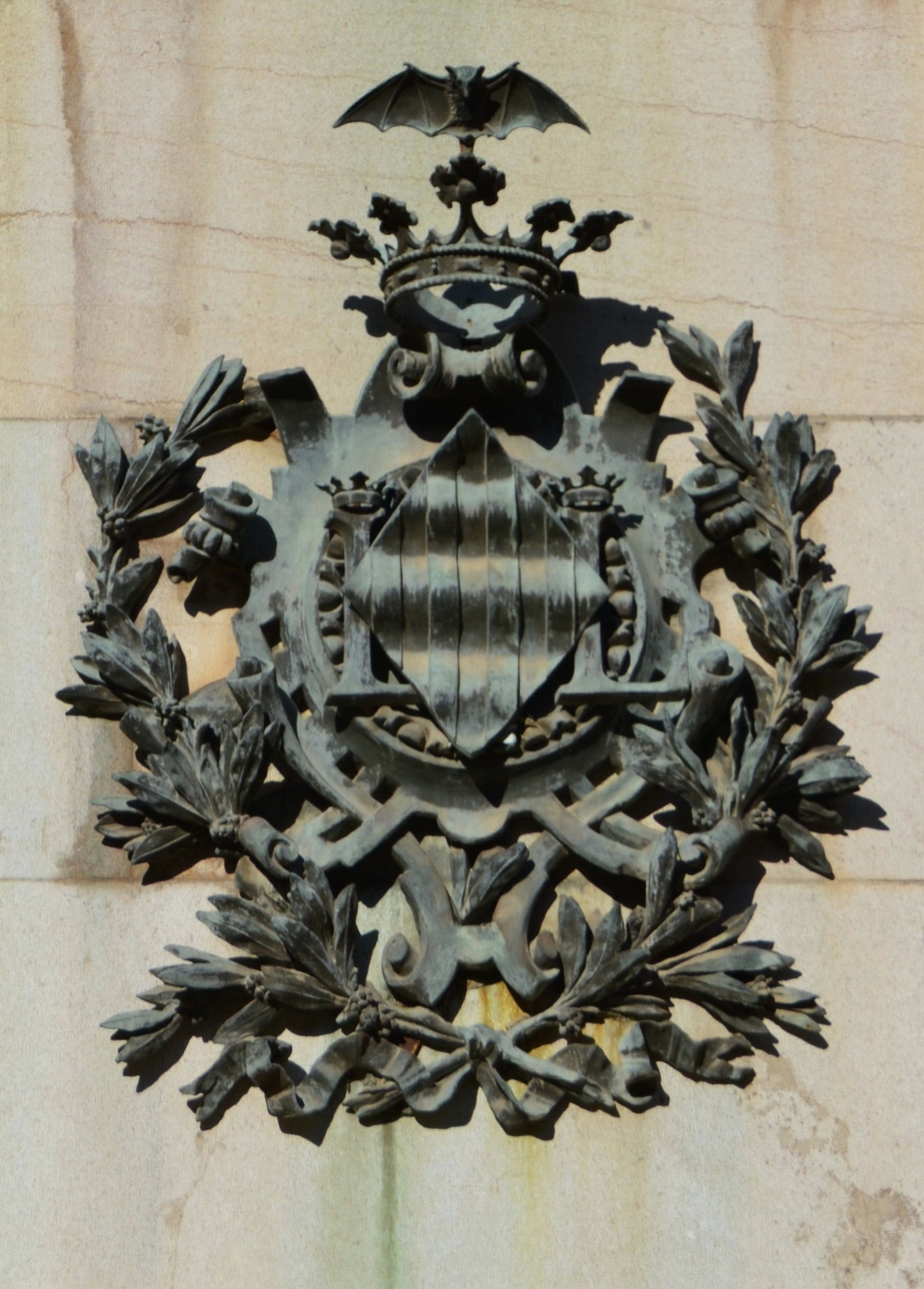
Coat of arms of Valencia featured in the pedestal

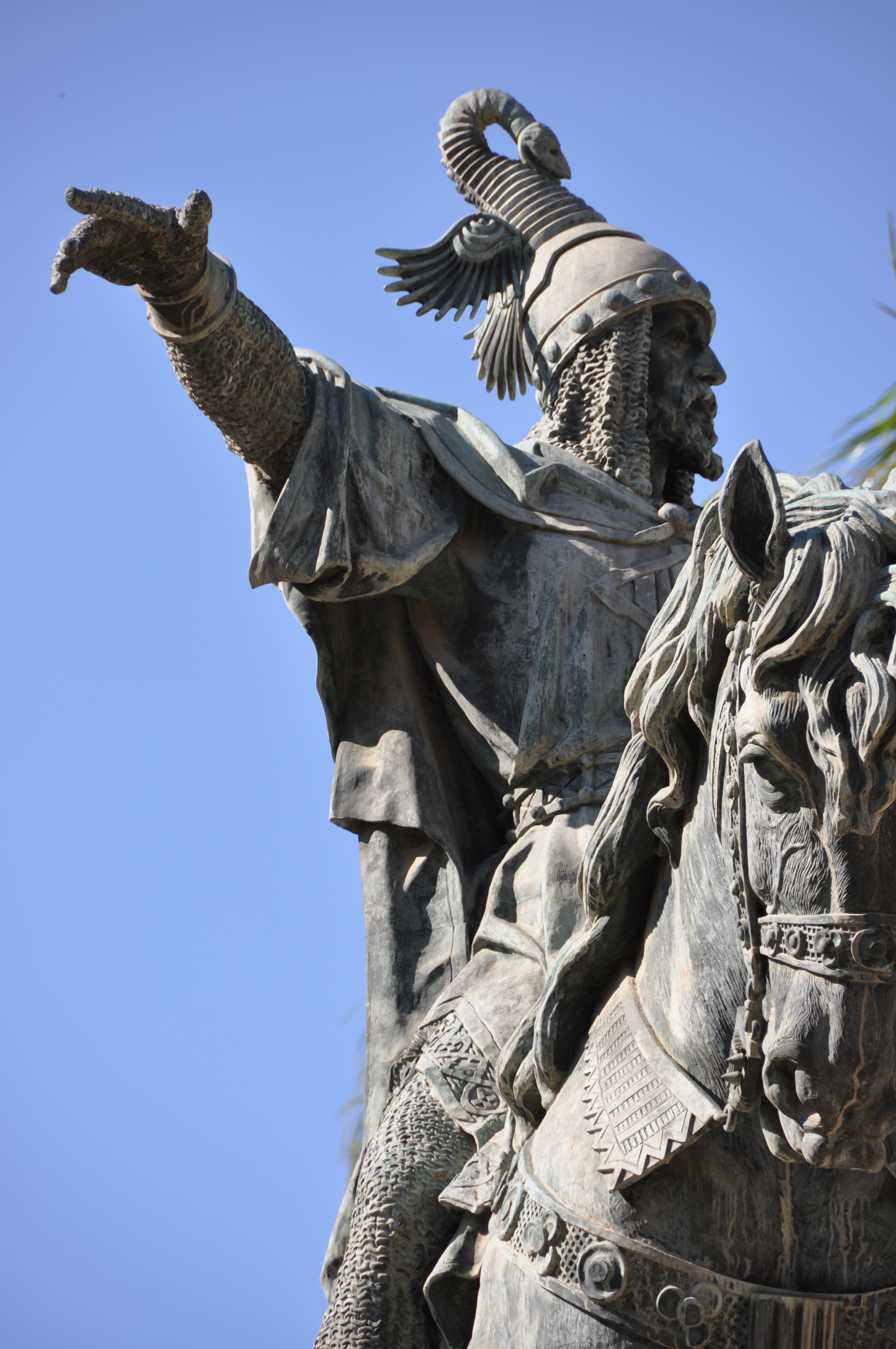
James I anachronistically wearing a Royal cimera of Aragon
