= Rossend Nobas =

Spanish sculptor and goldsmith

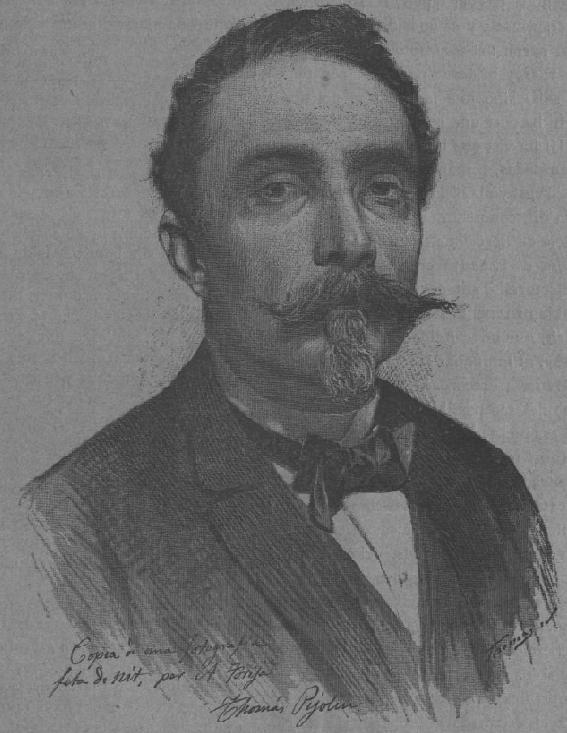
- Rossend Nobas i Ballbé (1891)
- Born: 1841; Barcelona
- Died: 5 February 1891 (aged 49–50); Barcelona
- Known for: Sculpture
- Style: Naturalism and Realism

Rossend Nobas i Ballbé was a Catalan sculptor and goldsmith in the 19th century. Working mainly in Barcelona, Nobas's work is to be found around the city in both museums and public areas.

== Biography ==
Nobas was born in 1849. His father was a tinsmith. In working with his father, he was introduced to metallurgy techniques when he was quite young. This training brought him into contact with the Maseria family, a connection he would maintain for his entire career.

He studied under the brothers Agapit and Venanci Vallmitjana at the Escola de la Llotja. This school was dedicated to teaching art. There Nobas learned sculpture through studying great sculptors of the past. He eventually entered the workshop of the Vallmitjana brothers. After being with them and perfecting his technique, he created his own studio. He trained Josep Gamot, Josep Reynés, and Manuel Fuxà, among many others.

He exhibited in the Paris Salon of 1866. In 1871, at the National Exhibition of Fine Arts in Madrid, Nobas received a second-class medal for his work the Wounded Bullfighter. His Bust of Cervantes gained an award at the World Exhibition in Vienna in 1873.

He died unexpectedly of pneumonia in 1891.

== Style ==
While Nobas also trained in oil painting and watercolors, as was part of the typical Art Education, he specialized in sculpture. His work spans large, monumental pieces, to bust portraiture. Nobas followed the naturalism and realism schools. In an era before photography, naturalistic art represented the subject realistically. His work was characterized by his exceptional talent as a sculptor. His rendering of fine details, like lace, is unparalleled.

== List of art works ==
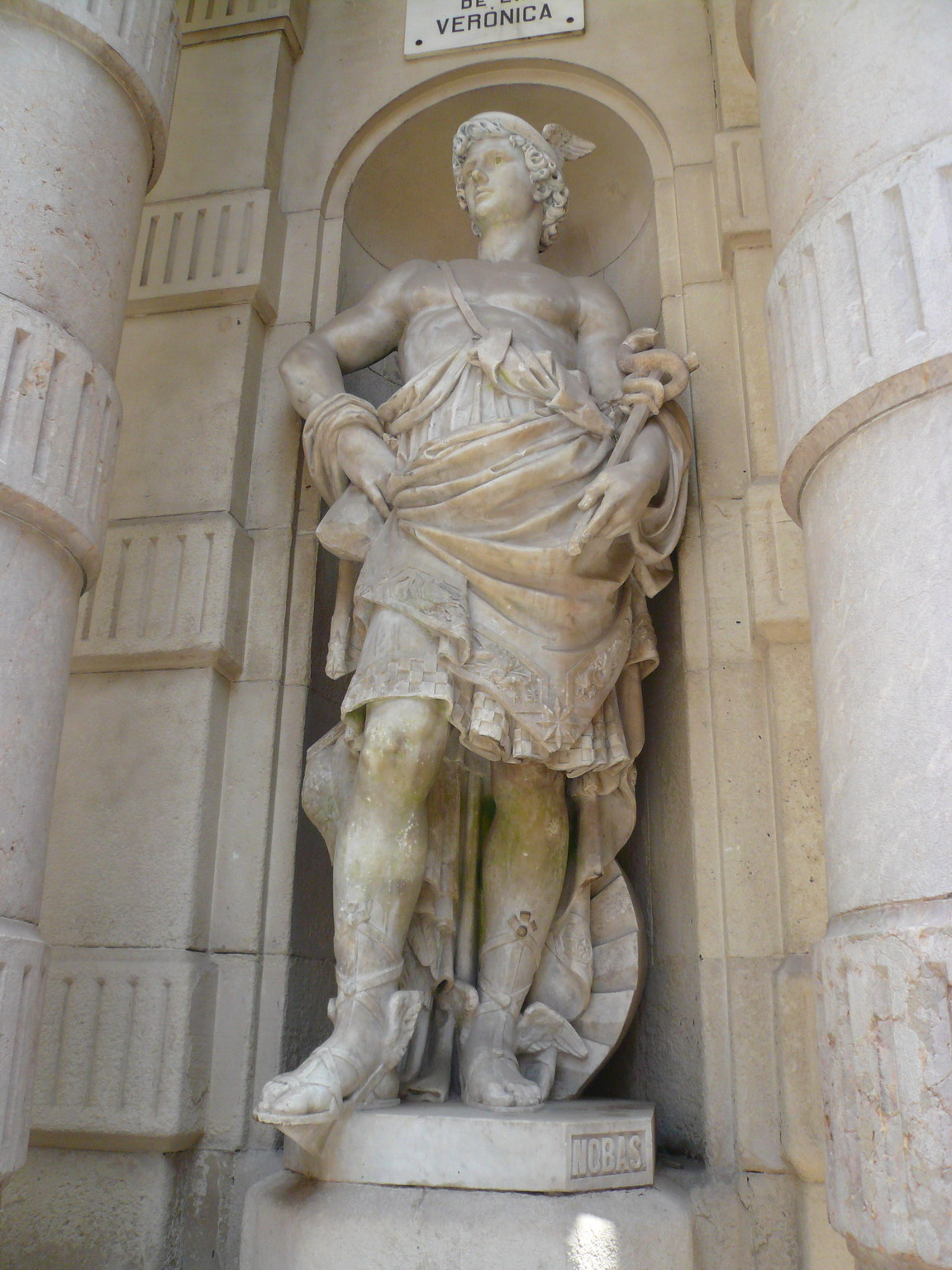
Statue of Mercury

Date	Name of work	Location
1870	Christ Crucified	
1871	Wounded Bullfighter	Museu Nacional d'Art de Catalunya
1872	Bust of Cervantes	
1878	Catalan Women	
1879	Bust of Marià Fortuny	
1879	Statue of general Josep Cabrinetty	plaça major de Puigcerdà
1879	Terracotta Busts of Cervantes, Milton, and Dante	
1881	Lions	Vestibule of Palau de la Generalitat de Catalunya
1882	Bust of Aristotle	Universitat de Barcelona
1882	Saint Thomas	
1883	La Dolorosa	Pamplona
1883	Statue of Mercury	Casino Mercantil de Barcelona
1884	Portrait Bust of Elisa Masriera	Museu Nacional d'Art de Catalunya
1885	Quadriga de l'Aurora	Cascada del Parc de la Ciutadella, Barcelona
1888	Monument to Rafael Casanova i Comes	Ronda Sant Pere, Barcelona
1888	Joan Güell i Ferrer	Barcelona
