= Venancio Vallmitjana =

Spanish sculptor (1830–1919)

Venancio Vallmitjana Barbany
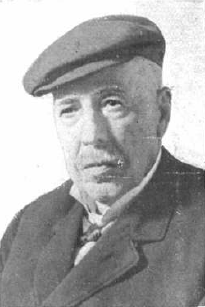
- Photograph published in Mundo Gráfico, 15 October 1913
- Born: April 1, 1830; Barcelona, Spain
- Died: September 3, 1919 (aged 89); Barcelona
- Citizenship: Spanish
- Education: Escola de la Llotja
- Occupation: Sculptor
- Organization(s): Reial Acadèmia de Ciències i Arts de Barcelona; Reial Acadèmia Catalana de Belles Arts de Sant Jordi
- Children: Agapito Vallmitjana Abarca

Venancio Vallmitjana Barbany (Note: He is currently mentioned in some works by the form of his name in standard Catalan, as "Venanci Vallmitjana i Barbany". Vallmitjana is the paternal surname, Barbany his mother's surname.) (Barcelona, 1 April 1830 – Barcelona, 3 September 1919) was a Spanish sculptor.

== Biography ==
Vallmitjana studied at the Escola de la Llotja in Barcelona, where he received instruction from the sculptor Damià Campeny. In 1856 he was appointed professor at that school. His important role as a teacher has been highlighted, as many of his pupils went on to achieve great success as sculptors, among them Josep Llimona, Pablo Gargallo, and Eusebi Arnau. He has been regarded as an artist ahead of his time, and indeed on more than one occasion he clashed with the canons of "official" art.

Venancio Vallmitjana's life and works were closely linked to those of his brother Agapito Vallmitjana, also a sculptor, and the two in fact signed all their works "V. y A." This has made it very difficult to distinguish the work of each one subsequently. He shared a studio with his brother until 1883, when he opened a new studio with his son, also a sculptor, Agapito Vallmitjana Abarca. Connected to the Court — Queen Isabella II visited the brothers' studio in Barcelona in 1860 and a year later they presented their work at the Royal Palace of Madrid — and to a purist aesthetic with Renaissance influences, cultivated to a greater degree by his brother Agapito, Venancio opened himself up to the French influence, more monumentalist in nature, and in 1873 he travelled to Paris. He also worked with his son, Agapit Vallmitjana i Abarca.

Vallmitjana died in Barcelona in 1919.

== Distinctions ==
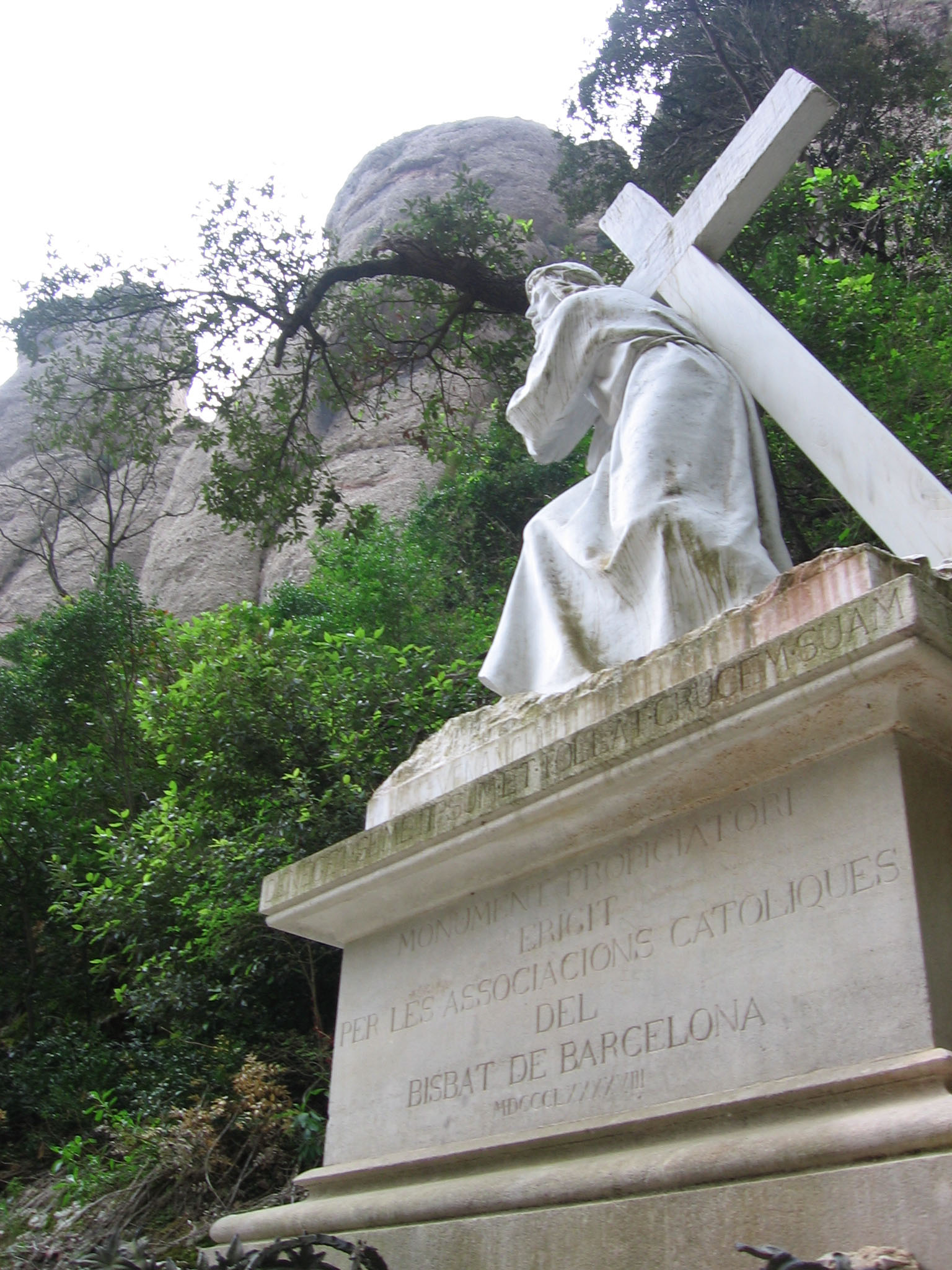
Fourth Sorrowful Mystery of the Rosario Monumental of Montserrat. The Way of the Cross.

- 1861 – Second medal at the National Exhibition in Madrid.
- 1873 – Second prize, Le Figaro, in Paris.
- 1890 – First medal at the National Exhibition in Madrid.

== Notable works ==
- Cargador de Bilbao. Bilbao Fine Arts Museum.
- 1862. Santa Isabel de Hungría (in collaboration with his brother Agapito). Museo del Prado. Marble group given by the brothers to Queen Isabella II, who assigned them a pension of two thousand reales per month for the duration of the work's execution after having seen and approved the sketch at the palace.
- 1880. Bust of Jesús de Monasterio. Royal Academy of Fine Arts of San Fernando, Madrid.
- 1882. Design for Venus in the monumental Cascada (waterfall) in the Ciutadella Park, Barcelona. The sculpture was executed by Eduard B. Alentorn.
- 1884. Faun.
- 1884. Allegory of Commerce and Industry. Entrance to Parc de la Ciutadella, Barcelona.
- 1884. The original sculpture of the work A López y López, which was completely destroyed in 1936.
- 1887. Beauty Dominating Force. Museo del Prado, Madrid.
- 1887. Enamelled Virgin. Museu Nacional d'Art de Catalunya.
- 1889. Queen María Cristina de Habsburgo-Lorena with Alfonso XIII. Maritime Museum of Barcelona.
- 1890–1896. Majo and Maja. Museo Nacional del Prado.
- 1891. Queen María Cristina and the infant Alfonso XIII. Museo del Prado.
- 1899. Christ for the Fourth Sorrowful Mystery of the Rosario Monumental of Montserrat.
- 1900. The Assumption of the Virgin Mary. Fourth Glorious Mystery of the Monumental Rosary of Montserrat.
- 1902. The Visitation of Mary to her cousin Elizabeth. Second Joyful Mystery of the Monumental Rosary of Montserrat.
- 1903. Bust of Mozart.
- 1913. Fuente de Diana. Monument located on the Gran Vía of Barcelona.
- Pantheon of Joan Niqui, in the Poblenou Cemetery, Barcelona.

== Bibliography ==
- Azcué, Leticia (2019). Leticia Azcue, La melancolía de Roma: la escultura religiosa académica en la Corte alfonsina. Ecos puristas en la obra de Martín Riesco, los hermanos Vallmitjana o Samsó. Svmma Stvdiorum Scvlptoricae II Congr. Inter. escult religiosa, Crevillent, Inst. alicantino Cultura, Dip. Alicante 2019, 59-104. II Congreso Internacional de Escultura Religiosa, Crevillent, 25 al 28 de octubre de 2018.
- Avelí Artis, Andreu (1971). Retratos de Ramón Casas [Portraits of Ramón Casas] (in Spanish). Polígrafa.
- García Melero, José Enrique (1998). Arte español de la Ilustración y del siglo XIX. En torno a la imagen del pasado [Spanish Art of the Enlightenment and the 19th Century. Around the Image of the Past] (in Spanish). Madrid: Ediciones Encuentro.
