= Antoni Vila Arrufat =

Catalan engraver

- Born: Antoni Vila i Arrufat; October 20, 1894; Sabadell, Spain
- Died: September 18, 1989 (aged 94); Barcelona, Spain
- Education: Escola de la Llotja; Real Academia de Bellas Artes de San Fernando
- Known for: Engraving, painting
- Children: Joan Vila-Grau
- Father: Joan Vila Cinca

Antoni Vila Arrufat (1894–1989) was a Spanish engraver from Sabadell in Catalonia.

== Bibliography ==
- Antoni Vila Arrufat [exhibition catalogue]. Madrid: Artigrafia, 1971.
- Antoni Vila Arrufat. Gravats [exhibition catalogue]. Barcelona: Departament de Cultura, Generalitat de Catalunya, 1991.
- A. Vila Arrufat. Pintures 1918-1976 [exhibition catalogue]. Sabadell: Pinacoteca Sabadell, 1977.
- Cartells de Festa Major. Impresos, originals, programes i fotografies [exhibition catalogue]. Sabadell: Arxiu Històric de Sabadell, Muse d'Art de Sabadell, 1983.
- CASAMARTINA PARASSOLS, Josep: Marian Burguès. Un terrisser que va fer història. Sabadell: Fundació Caixa de Sabadell, Patronat dels Museus Municipals de Sabadell, 1993.
- CASAMARTINA PARASSOLS, Josep: Vila Arrufat a Sabadell. Sabadell: Comissió pro-centenari del pintor Antoni Vila Arrufat, 1994.
- CASTELLS PEIG, Eduard: L'art sabadellenc. Sabadell: Ed. Riutort, 1961.
- Centenari Antoni Vila Arrufat (1894-1994) [exhibition catalogue]. Barcelona: Departament de Cultura, Generalitat de Catalunya, 1994.
- El Noucentisme. Un projecte de modernitat [exhibition catalogue]. Barcelona: Departament de Cultura, Generalitat de Catalunya, Enciclopèdia Catalana, 1994.
- Gent de mar. Pintura costumista catalana ss. XIX i XX [exhibition catalogue]. Vilassar de Mar: Museu de la Marina, 1993.
- Volum 20 (2004), Gran Enciclopèdia Catalana, Barcelona, Edicions 62. ISBN 8429754482
- La collecció 1875-1936. Sabadell: Museu d'Art de Sabadell, Ajuntament de Sabadell, 2002, p. 154-161.
- Llegat Enric Palà Girvent [exhibition catalogue]. Sabadell: Centenari Sabadell Ciutat, Museu d'Art de Sabadell, 1977.
- Llegat Joan Figueras Crehueras [exhibition catalogue]. Sabadell: Museu d'Art de Sabadell, 1978.
- MATES, Joan: La jove pintura local. Sabadell: Biblioteca Sabadellenca, núm. 15, 1927, p. 83-129.
- MERLI, Joan: 33 Pintors catalans. Barcelona: Comissariat de Propaganda de la Generalitat de Catalunya, 1937, p. 207-212.
- RÀFOLS, J.F.: Diccionario biográfico de artistas de Cataluña, vol. III. Barcelona: Millà, 1954, p. 235.
- Vila Arrufat [exhibition catalogue]. Barcelona: Palau de la Virreina, Ajuntament de Barcelona, 1984.
- Antonio Gallego Gallego (1979). Historia del grabado en España. Madrid, Ediciones Cátedra. ISBN 8437602092
- Gabriel Jackson (2004). «Los Vila». Barcelona, Meteora. ISBN 9788495623348
- Eusebi Vila Delclòs (2004). «Antoni Vila Arrufat». Barcelona, Editorial Meteora. ISBN 8495623331
- Francesc Fontbona (1980). Vila Arrufat. Maestros actuales de la pintura. ISBN 8424806581
