= Sylvia Ordóñez =

Mexican painter (born 1956)

Sylvia Ordóñez (born 1956) is a Mexican painter.

Born in Monterrey, Ordóñez traveled to Paris to study, and also attended the Slade School of Art in London. Her first exhibition was in her hometown in 1977. She began winning prizes the following year, in Mexican exhibits. In 1979 she traveled to Barcelona to study printmaking at the Escola de la Llotja. In 1990 she gained wider exposure when her work was shown in the exhibit "Women in Mexico" organized by Edward Sullivan for the National Academy of Design; she has since appeared in other American exhibitions. She lives and works in the small town of Villa de García, Nuevo León.
