= Joan Vila-Grau =

Spanish painter and stained-glass artist (1932–2022)

- Born: Joan Vila i Grau; 14 August 1932; Barcelona, Spain
- Died: 11 November 2022 (aged 90); Barcelona, Spain
- Education: Escuela Técnica Superior de Arquitectura de Barcelona
- Occupations: Painter; Artist

Joan Vila i Grau (14 August 1932 – 11 November 2022) was a Spanish painter and stained-glass artist.

== Biography ==
The son of artist Antoni Vila Arrufat, Vila-Grau studied at the Escuela Técnica Superior de Arquitectura de Barcelona from 1950 to 1955, although he eventually practiced painting. Interested in liturgical art, he specialized in stained glass for religious buildings, notably with the Sagrada Família in Barcelona. He created art alongside Joan Miró.

Vila-Grau established himself as a theoretician, founding the magazine Qüestions d'Art. He also wrote works such as Els vitrallers de la Barcelona modernista, Descoberta de la taula de vitraller de Girona, El vitrall renaixentista, Le vitrail dans l'architecture de Gaudí.

Vila-Grau was the director of the Instituto del Vitral in Barcelona, a member of the Reial Acadèmia Catalana de Belles Arts de Sant Jordi, and a member of the Royal Academy of Sciences and Arts of Barcelona. In 2010, he received the Creu de Sant Jordi from the Generalitat de Catalunya.

Joan Vila-Grau died in Barcelona on 11 November 2022, at the age of 90.

== Stained glass in the Sagrada Família ==
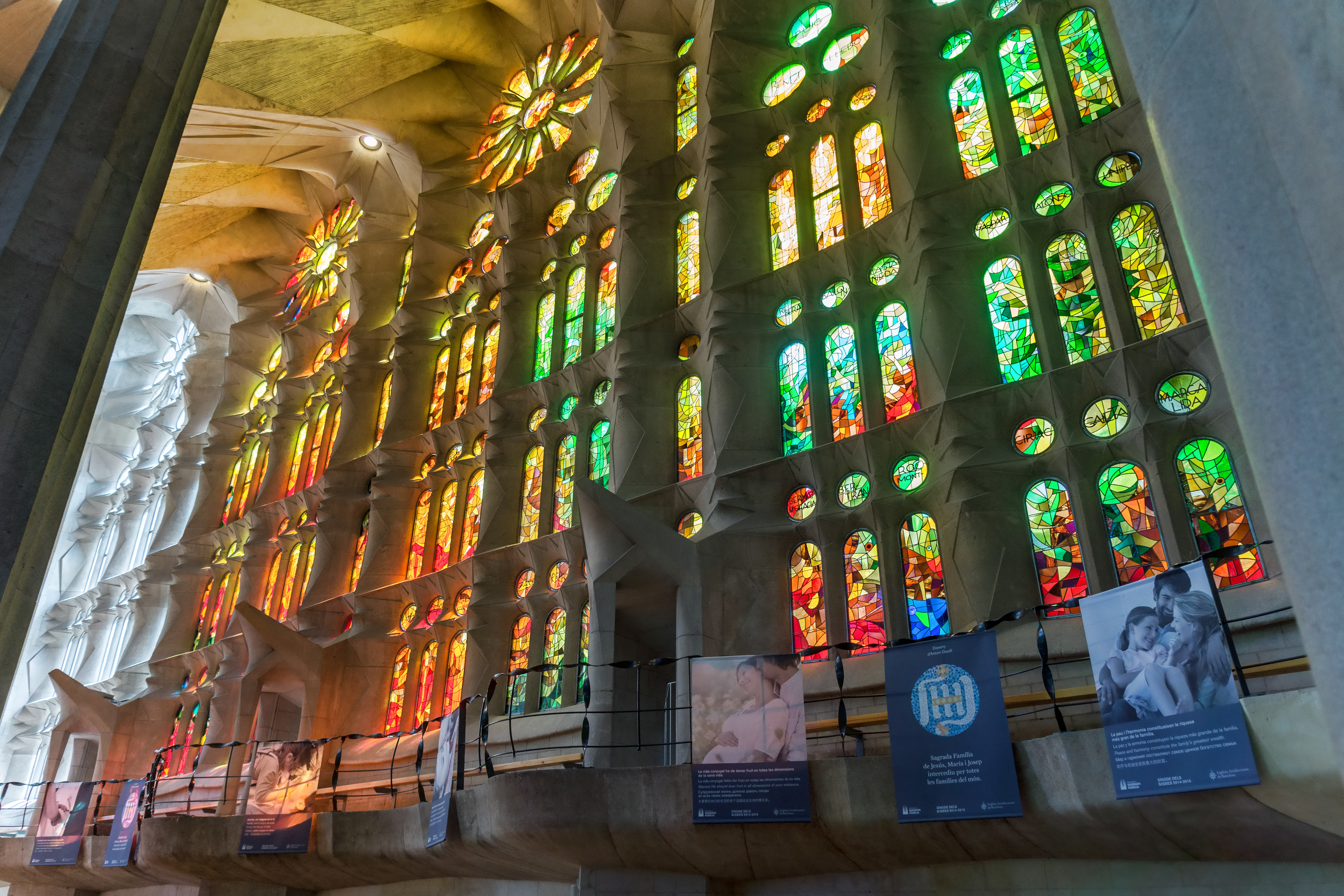

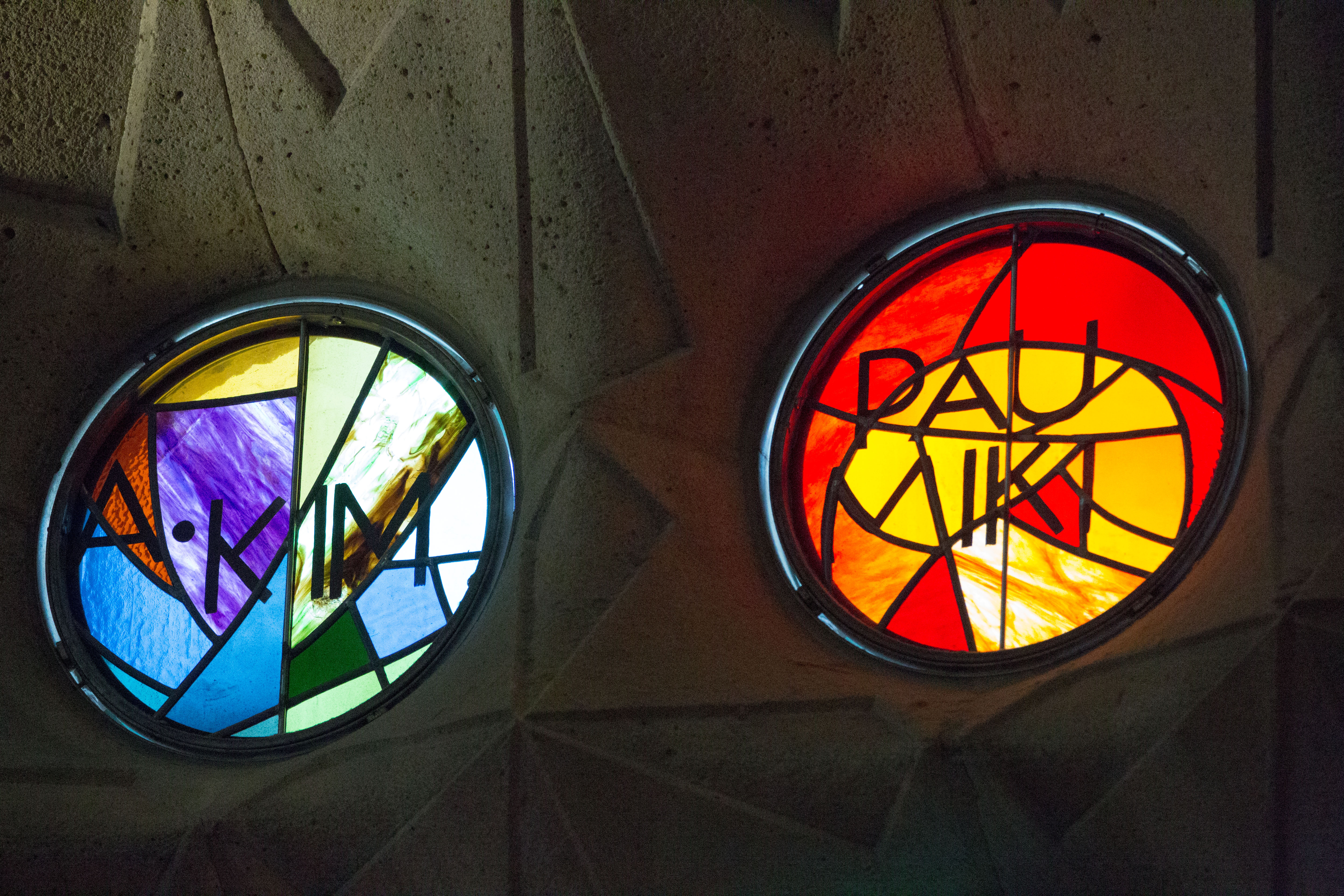

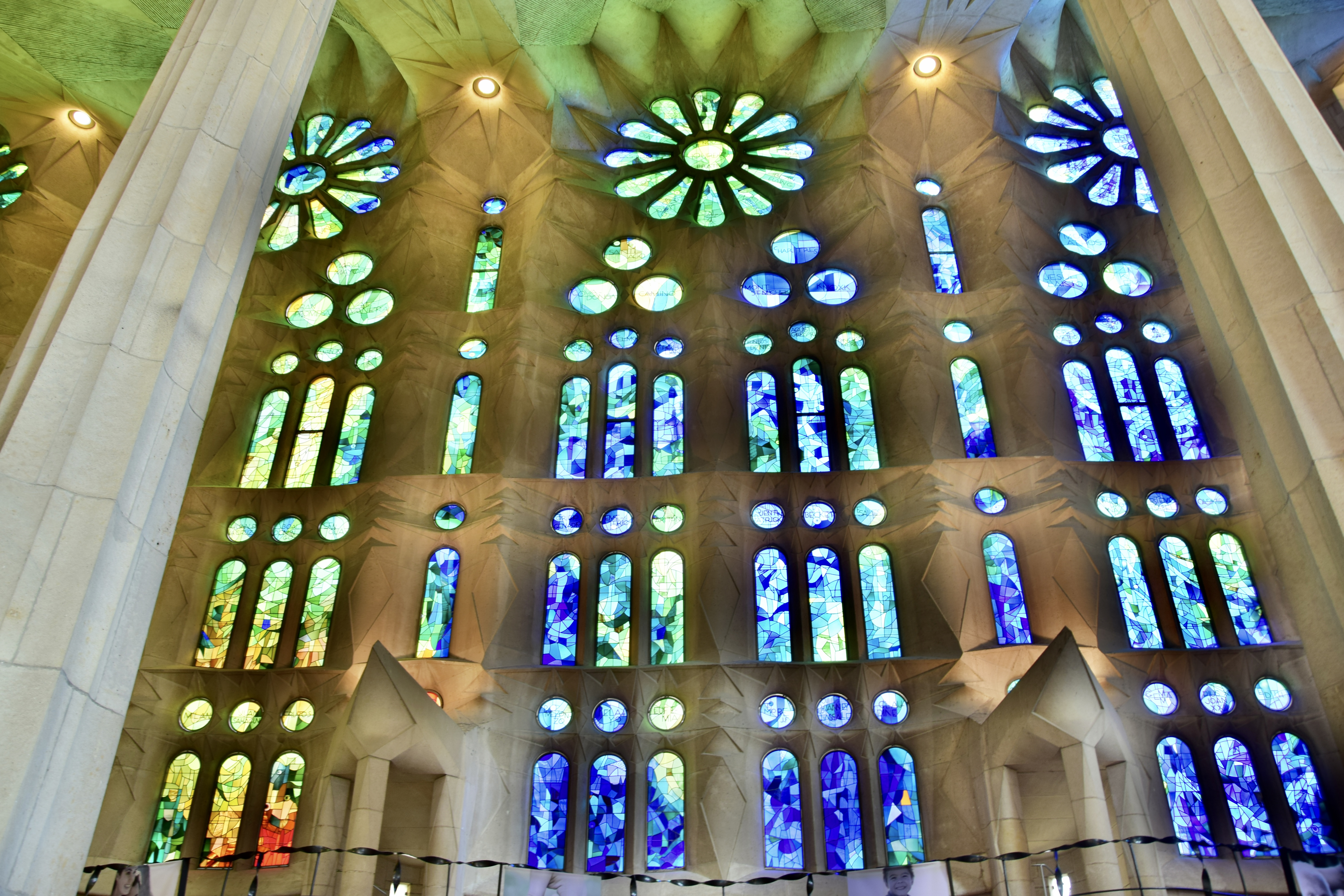

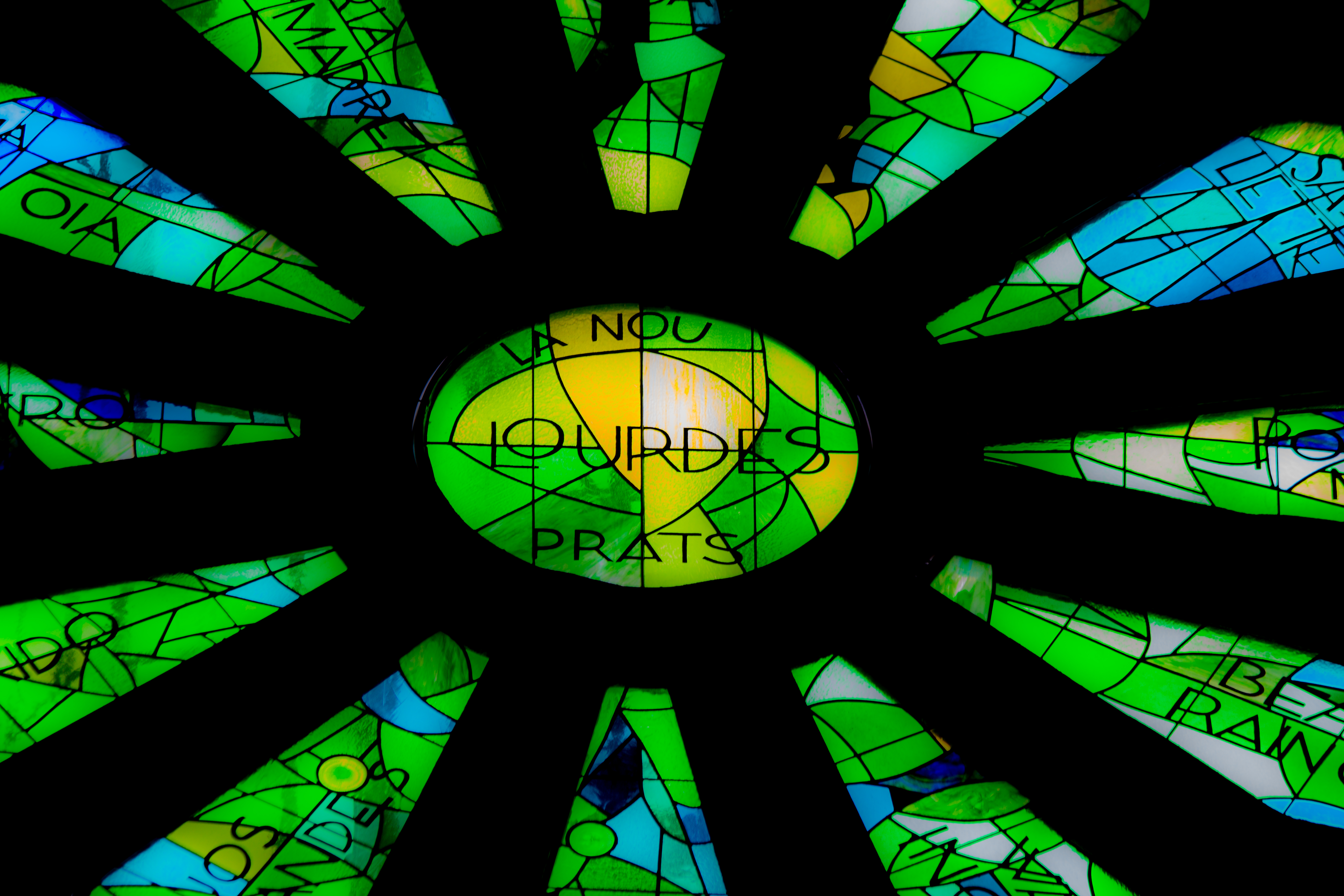

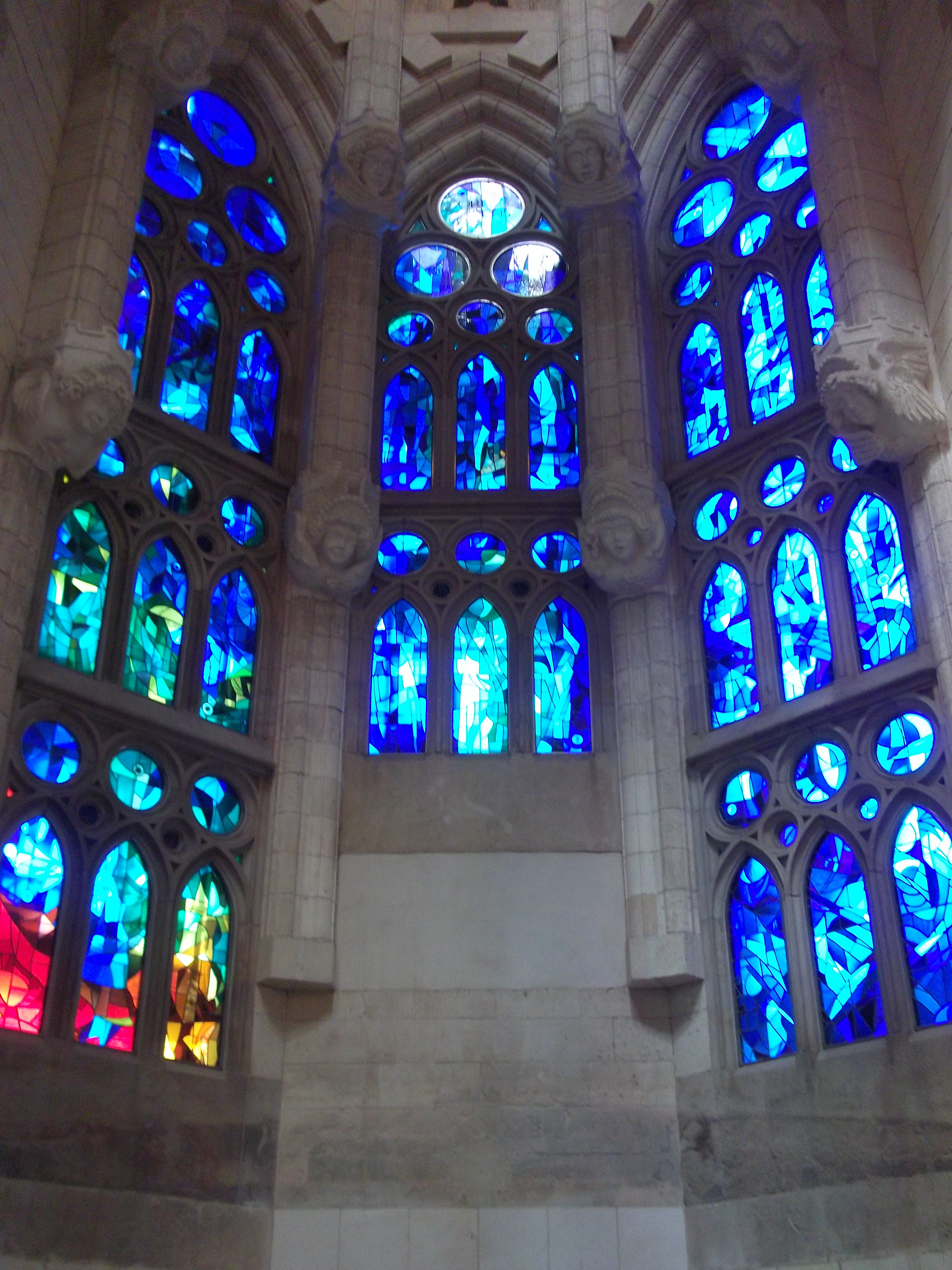

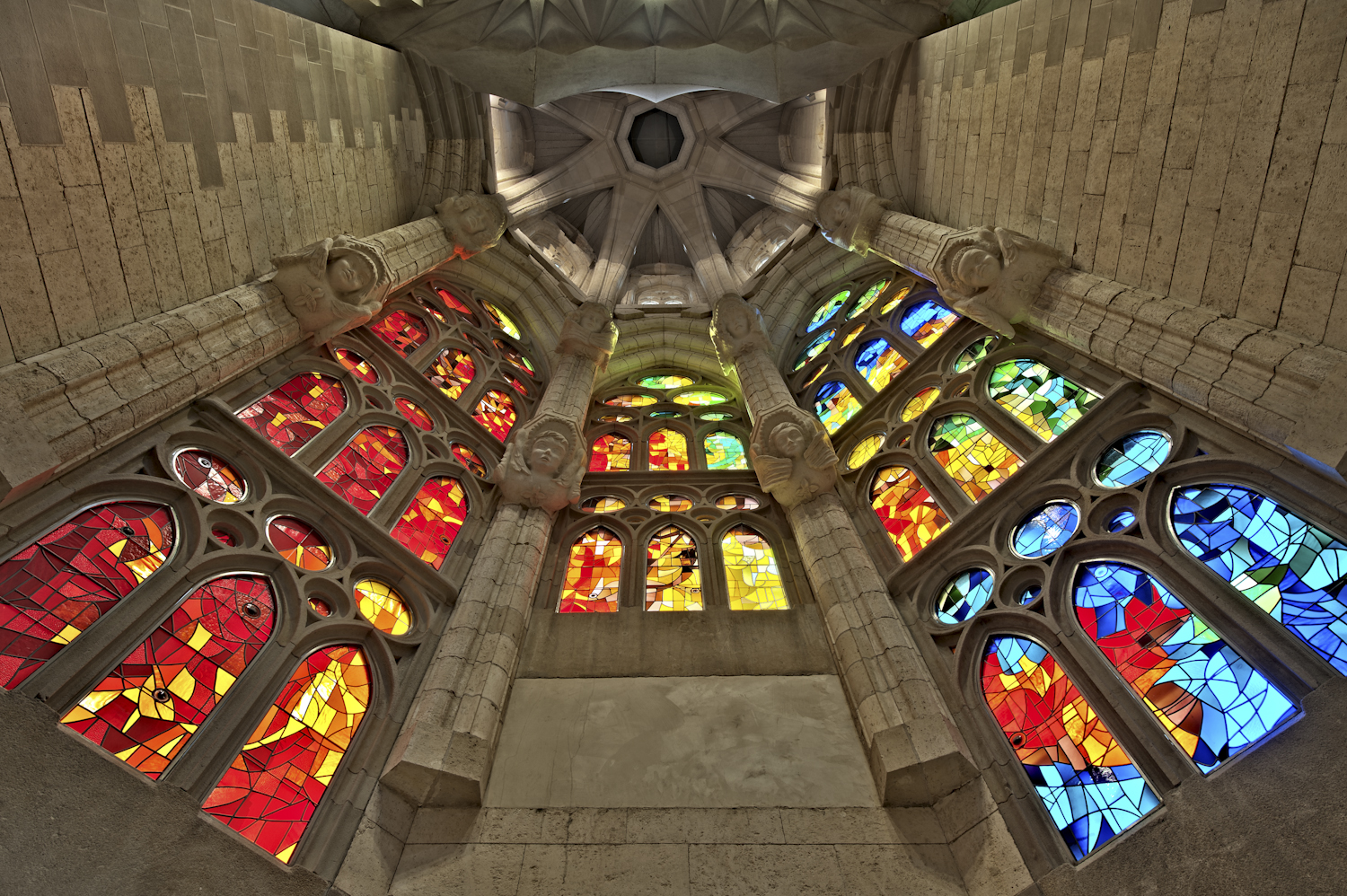
