= Luis Fraile =

Spanish artist (1947–2016)

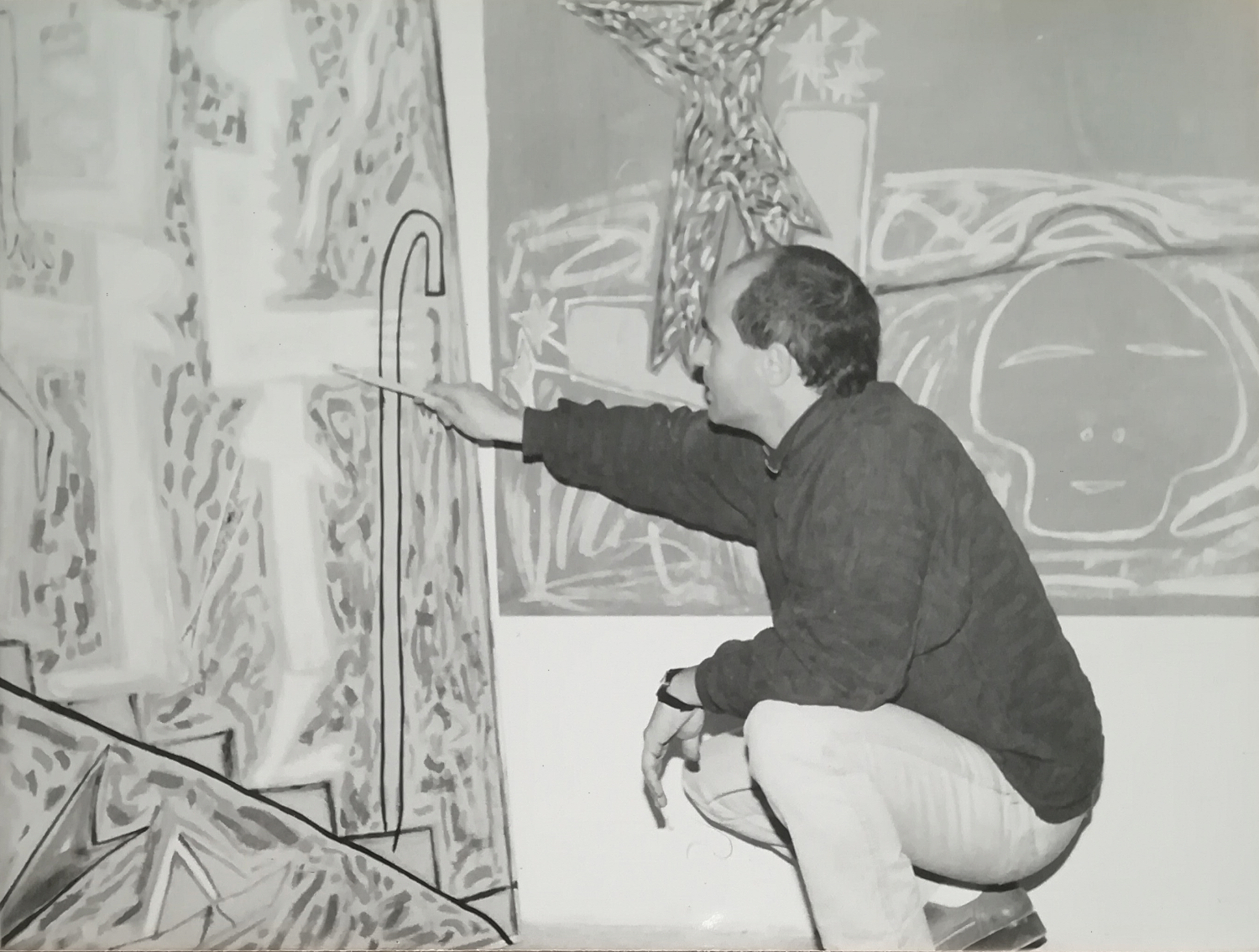
- The artist in his studio
- Born: Luis Martínez Fraile; February 7, 1947; Albacete
- Died: 5 January 2016 (aged 68); Madrid
- Known for: Painting
- Style: surrealist, expressionist, syncretist, figurative
- Website: www.luisfraile.eu

Luis Fraile (Albacete, February 7, 1947 - Madrid, January 5, 2016), was a Spanish artist with an extensive career path, who developed his activity mainly in Madrid. He embraced various trends and styles throughout his prolific artistic life, developing a style of his own around surrealism, reflecting a subconscious and dreamlike world.

== Biographical review ==
He was born in Albacete (February 7, 1947), in a humble family, the first of the two children of Valentín Martínez Flores, master builder and former political prisoner after the Spanish Civil War, and Julia Fraile Montalbán, factory worker and self-sacrificing housewife. During his childhood he combines studies with several jobs, amongst others as an employee in the mythical Casino Primitivo of the city, laboural and vital experiences that helped him to forge a very critical and mature view of the environment from a very early age. At the age of 20 he became Draftsman and Urban Planning Designer at the City Council of his hometown. He worked for the Cadastre and with the renowned architect Julio Carrilero Prat, designing amongst others, the Nautical Club of Torrevieja. Being Painting his true vocation, he decides to undertake several travels abroad in order to improve his technique and to learn new methods.

He studied Altarpiece and Polychromy in the Massana School of Barcelona, Ceramic (Barcelona Arts and Crafts School), as well as Engraving and Lithography, not only in the Catalan metropolis, but also in Paris (Atelier Hayter) and Toronto (North Toronto Collegiate), where he also made his living creating stained glass artworks. During his Parisian stay, it is also possible to review his studies of Plastic Arts (Université de Vincennes) and History of the Art (École du Louvre).

In the same way, his intellectual concerns and his extensive self-taught formation extended to multitude of subjects, will lead him to create a work in endless transformation. He was featured in important Spanish publications of the time (Diario ABC, Casa & Jardín, El Punto de las Artes, Revista de Artes Plásticas Cyan, La Brocha, Tribuna, Formas Plásticas, etc.), and was already awarded in its beginnings by the Güell Painting Foundation ( Barcelona, 1974 ) and finalist in the 7th Cleveland International Drawing Biennial in the United Kingdom. In the mid-1970s he even achieved representation with the veteran gallery owner Juana Mordó, but for various reasons he returned to Paris. For several decades, he exhibited locally and internationally. At the end of the 1980s, he settled permanently in Madrid with his family, where he created most of his paintings, being represented by the now extinct Novart Gallery.

After a long illness that kept him away from painting, Luis Fraile died on January 5, 2016. His artistic legacy consists of more than 3,000 works.

== Style ==
" The figurative world of Luis Fraile is complex, full of intentions that evolve over time, discovering new ideas. It is a reflective painting that offers a panorama of oppositions, the playful faced with the limitations turning in a measured whirlwind."

" He offers a dynamic of drawing, shapes and colors in a tension of encounters, dialogues and looks. In the rigid, hieratic and almost sacred figures of this painter there is frequently a man-woman dialogue; an energy and quarrel of the sexes; a magma open to the eye and the mind."

== Main individual exhibitions ==
1974: Real Círculo Artístico. Barcelona

1974: Galería Toison. Madrid

1975: Galerie Poisson d'Or. Paris

1978: Galerie Marigny. Paris

1979: Galerie Marigny. Paris

1982: De Cortez Gallery. Toronto

1983: De Cortez Gallery. Toronto

1987: Galería Novart. Madrid

1987: Galería Enebro. Segovia

1988: Galería Berruguete. Valladolid

1988: Museo de Calahorra. La Rioja

1988: Galería Arlanzón. Burgos

1988: Museo de Arte Contemporáneo de Vilafamés. Castellón

1988: InterArte 88. Valencia

1988: Museo de Arte Contemporáneo. Albacete

1989: Museo de La Rioja. Logroño

1989: Galería Novart. Madrid

1989: Obra Social y Cultural - Fundación de la Caja de Ahorros de Asturias. Gijón

1991: Heller Gallery. New York

1991: Galería Novart. Madrid

1991: Museo de Ciudad Real. Castilla-La Mancha

1993: Montserrat Contemporary Art Gallery. New York

== Public Collections ==
Fundación Güell - Barcelona

Real Academia de Bellas Artes de San Fernando - Madrid

Museo Internacional de Arte Contemporáneo - Guinea Ecuatorial

Museo de Calahorra - La Rioja

Museo de Arte Contemporáneo de Vilafamés - Castellón

Fundación Caja Asturias - Gijón

Museo de Arte Contemporáneo de Albacete - Castilla La Mancha

Museo Riojano de Arte Contemporáneo - Logroño

== Bibliography ==
- Soledad Villalba. "Gestos de Luis Fraile". Revista Cyan de Artes Plásticas. Madrid: Editorial Cyan, Nº16 1990
- J.M.C. "Luis Fraile". ABC Newspaper. Madrid: April 16, 1987
- Rosa Martínez de La Hidalga. El Punto de las Artes Weekly Magazine. Madrid: Editorial Arte y Patrimonio, 24–30 April 1987
- Rosa Martínez de La Hidalga. "Luis Fraile, incógnitas y sueños". Tribuna Médica Weekly Magazine. Madrid: April 1988
- Flavio Puviani. Dizionario Enciclopedico D'Arte Contemporanea. Ferrara: Casa Editrice Alba, 1995
- Eva Cañas. "Luis Fraile, pintura expresionista dentro de un hacer figurativo". La Tribuna Newspaper. Albacete: Promecal, December 8, 1988
- Javier Leon Herrera. "Luis Fraile, pintor". La Verdad Newspaper. Murcia: Grupo Correo, December 8, 1988
- Rosa Martínez de La Hidalga. "Luis Fraile, toda una conjunción de elementos". El Punto de las Artes Weekly Magazine. Madrid: May 28, 1989
- Fernando Fernán-Gómez. Directorio de Arte España y Portugal. Madrid: Editorial Arteguía, 1998
- María José Rodríguez. Revista mensual de las artes plásticas. Madrid: Correo del Arte, December 1989
