= Antonio Alegre Cremades =

Spanish painter, engraver, and professor (1939-2006)

- Born: June 2, 1939; Alginet, Valencia, Spain
- Died: October 15, 2006 (aged 67); Valencia, Spain
- Citizenship: Spanish
- Education: School of San Carlos, Valencia
- Known for: Painting, engraving, teaching

Antonio Alegre Cremades (2 June 1939 – 15 October 2006) was a Spanish painter, engraver, and professor. His works are preserved in public collections such as the Museu d'Art Contemporani Vicente Aguilera Cerni (MACVAC) and the Real Academia de Bellas Artes de San Fernando (Royal Academy of Fine Arts of San Fernando).

== Early life and education ==
Alegre Cremades was born in Alginet, Valencia, in 1939. He studied at the School of San Carlos in Valencia, where he later taught. He was also part of the founding board of the Cátedra de Eméritos de la Comunidad Valenciana (Chair of Emeritus Professors of the Valencian Community).

== Career ==
His early works were linked to figurative and academic painting. From the 1970s, he developed a series titled El hombre y la máquina (The Man and the Machine), exploring the relationship between human beings and technology. This body of work was later described by the Diputación de Valencia (Provincial Council of Valencia) as futurismo humano ("human futurism").

In 2013, the MuVIM (Valencian Museum of Illustration and Modernity) exhibited a retrospective titled Obra inédita de los años 70 (Unpublished Work from the 1970s), which brought together more than thirty works from this series.

His work has also been exhibited at the Ateneo Mercantil de Valencia (Mercantile Athenaeum of Valencia).

== Publications ==
In 2009, the Institució Alfons el Magnànim published a monograph about his life and work, titled La pasión por el arte: Antonio Alegre Cremades (The Passion for Art: Antonio Alegre Cremades). The same year, the newspaper Levante-EMV reported on another monograph focusing on his engravings.

== Studies and recognition ==
The philosopher and art critic Román de la Calle included Alegre Cremades in his book 12 artistas valencianos contemporáneos en la Real Academia de Bellas Artes de San Carlos (12 Contemporary Valencian Artists in the Royal Academy of Fine Arts of San Carlos) (2008). In this study, he described himself as "a genuine painter and poet of the image" who sought "to transfigure reality into symbols, using the plastic arts as his basic resource".

== Death ==
Alegre Cremades died on 15 October 2006 in Valencia. His death was reported by national newspapers such as "El Confidencial" and "ABC".
