= Damià Campeny =

Spanish Classical sculptor (1771–1855)

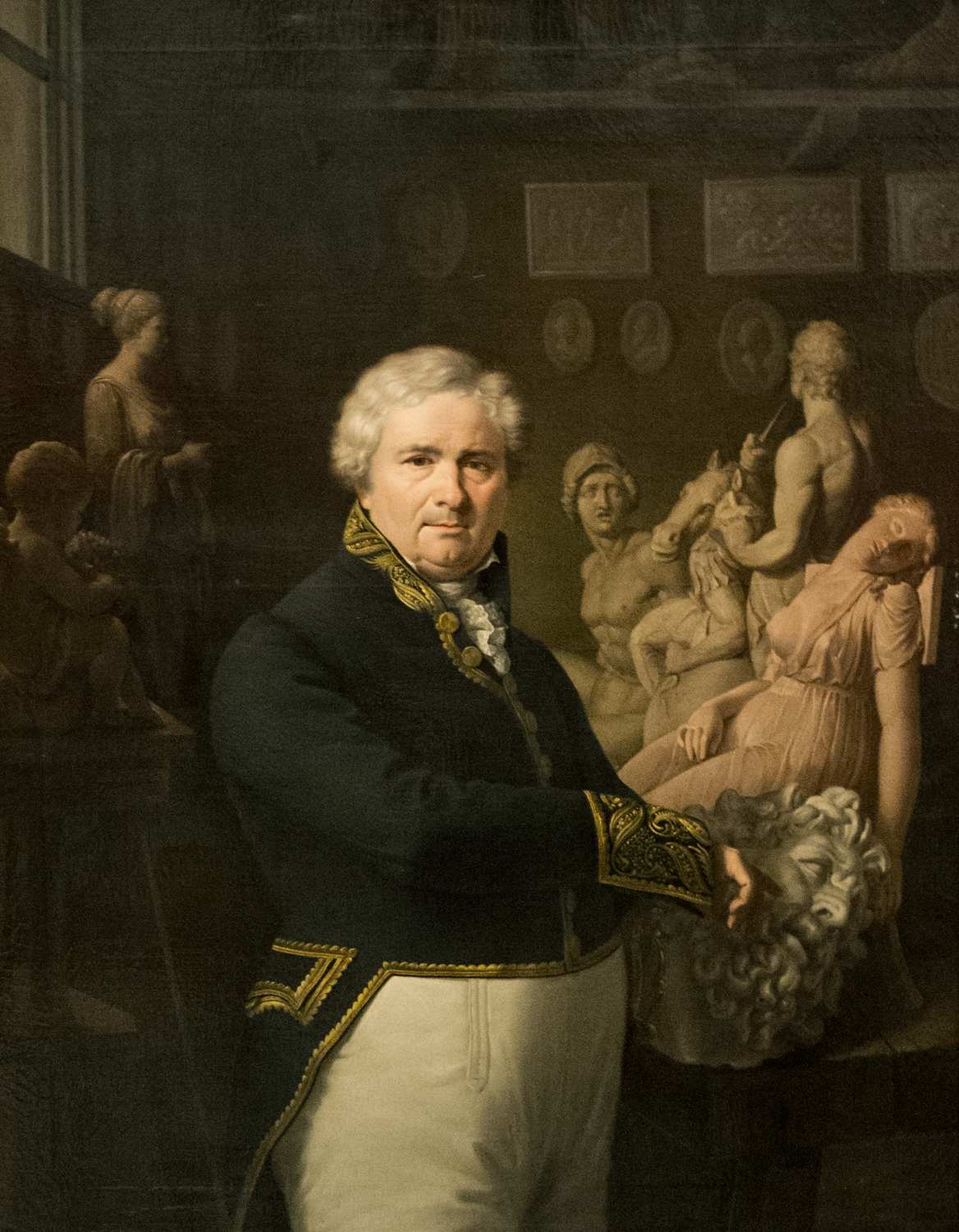
- Damià Campeny; portrait by Vicenç Rodes (C.1838)
- Born: Damià Campeny i Estrany; 12 April 1771; Mataró, Catalonia, Spain
- Died: 17 July 1855 (aged 84); Barcelona, Catalonia, Spain
- Known for: Sculpture
- Movement: Classicism

Damià Campeny i Estrany (12 April 1771 in Mataró – 17 July 1855 in Barcelona) was a Spanish sculptor in the Classical style.

== Biography ==
He was born to the shoemaker, Andreu Campeny, and his wife Casilda. His first studies were at a private Catholic school. After completing his primary education, he studied at the Escola de la Llotja in Barcelona. He was also employed in the workshops of the sculptor, Salvador Gurri i Corominas and, later, worked with Nicolau Travé. He then opened his own studio; receiving commissions for religious sculptures from several local parishes.

In 1797, he was awarded a stipend from the Board of Trade, to continue his studies in Rome. There, he became acquainted with the famous sculptor, Antonio Canova, and spent eighteen years at the Vatican workshops, creating sculptures on mythological themes; such as Hercules and Neptune. Many of his works were sent back home, to the Board of Trade.

When he returned to Barcelona, he became a Professor at his alma mater, the Escola, and was named Director of the sculpture department in 1819. He was also offered a Professorship at the Real Academia de Bellas Artes de San Fernando, which he declined, and a position as Court Sculptor for King Ferdinand VII, which he accepted. His other appointments include that of Academician at the Escola de Sant Lluís, in Zaragoza, and the Real Academia de Bellas Artes de San Carlos de Valencia. He became one of the first teachers at what is now the Reial Acadèmia Catalana de Belles Arts de Sant Jordi in 1850, despite questions about his age and health.

Numerous disputes regarding his salary, and payments for his sculptures, left him in near poverty. His health worsened and he died, from "senile dysentery", at his home in Sant Gervasi de Cassoles, now part of Barcelona.

His works may be found at MNAC, the Reial Acadèmia Catalana de Belles Arts de Sant Jordi, and the Biblioteca Museu Víctor Balaguer in Vilanova i la Geltrú, among others. In 1999, a retrospective was held at the Museu Frederic Marès.

== Selected works ==
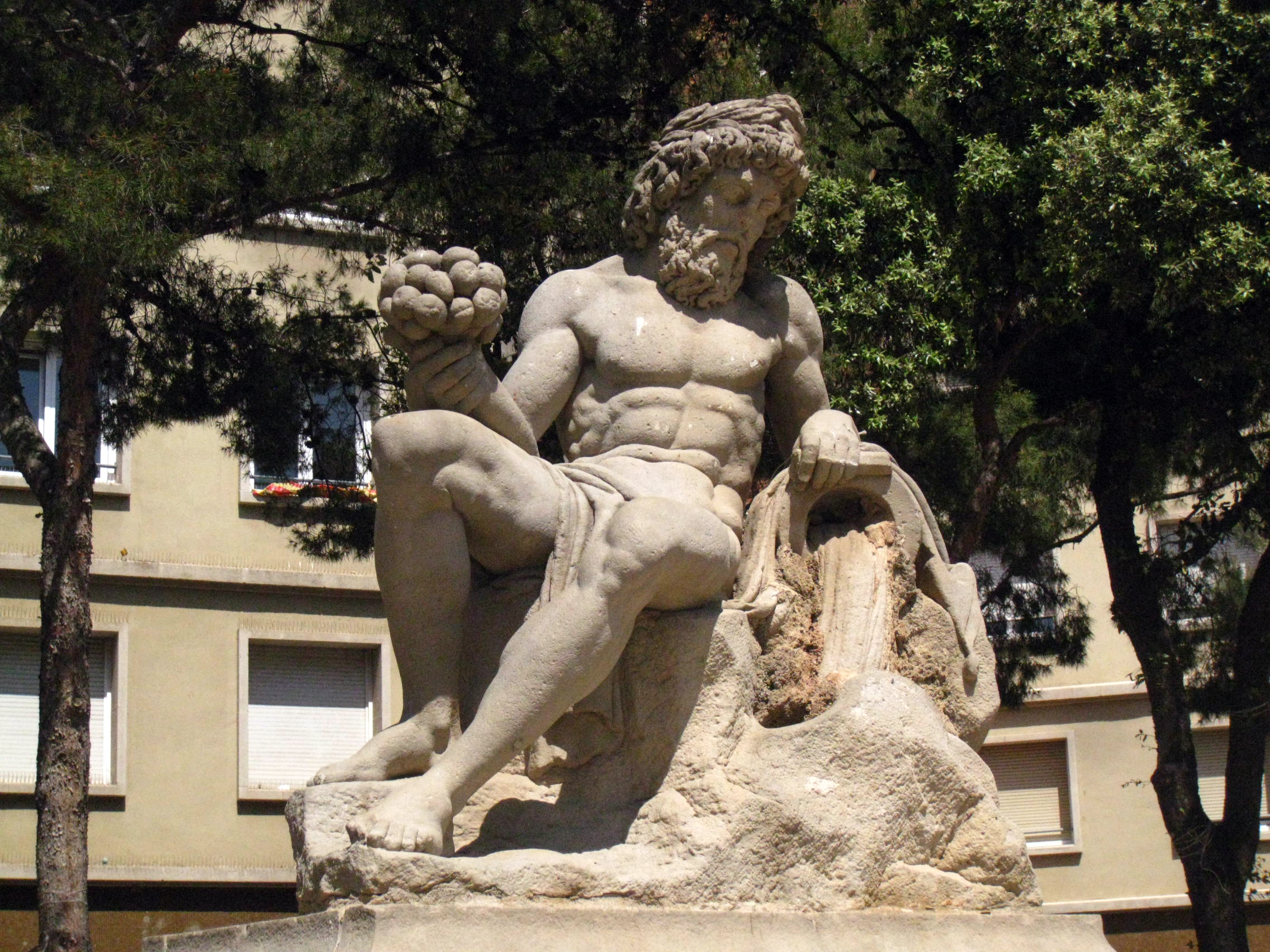
Fountain of the Elder (1818)

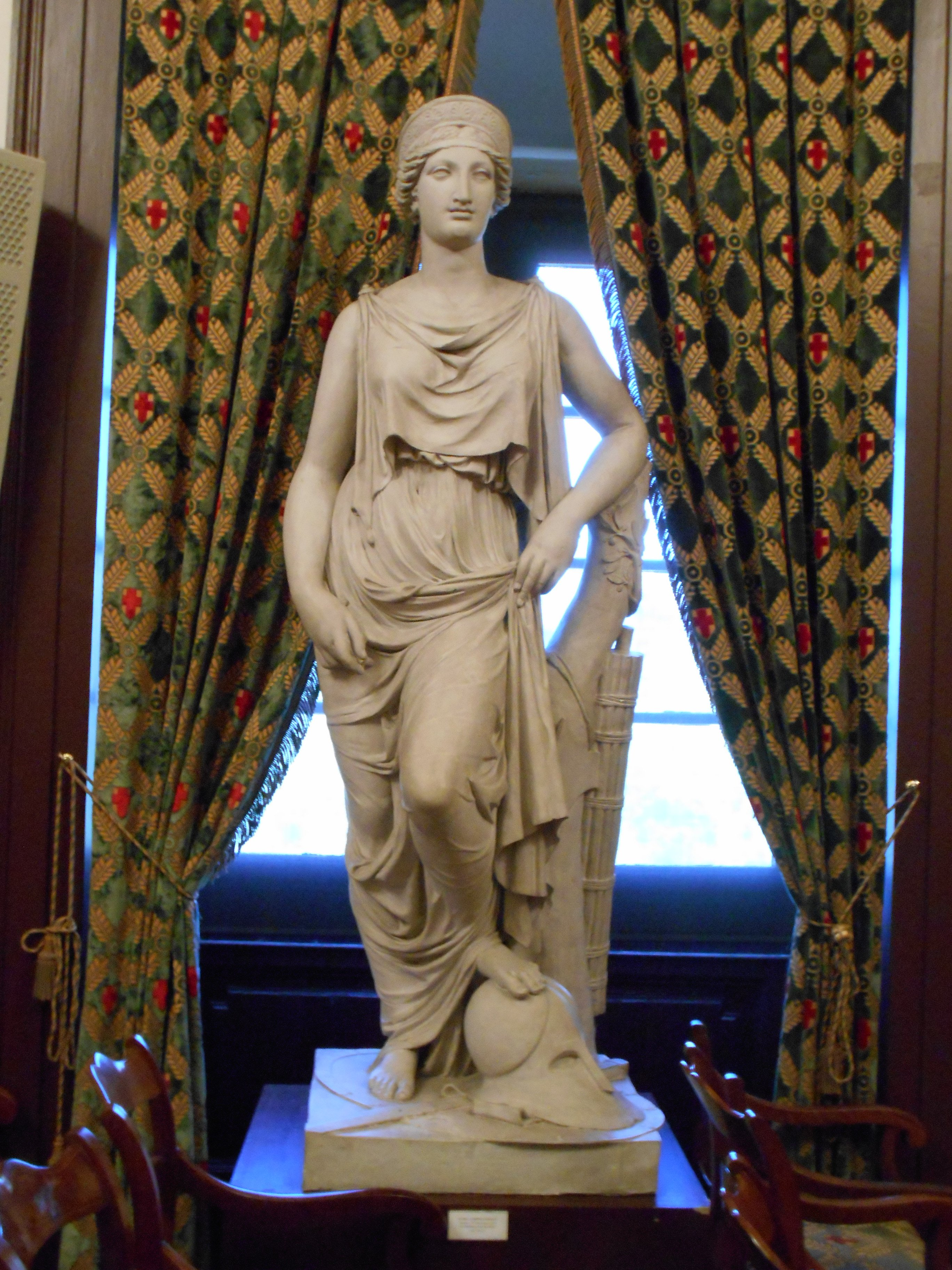
Peace (1827)

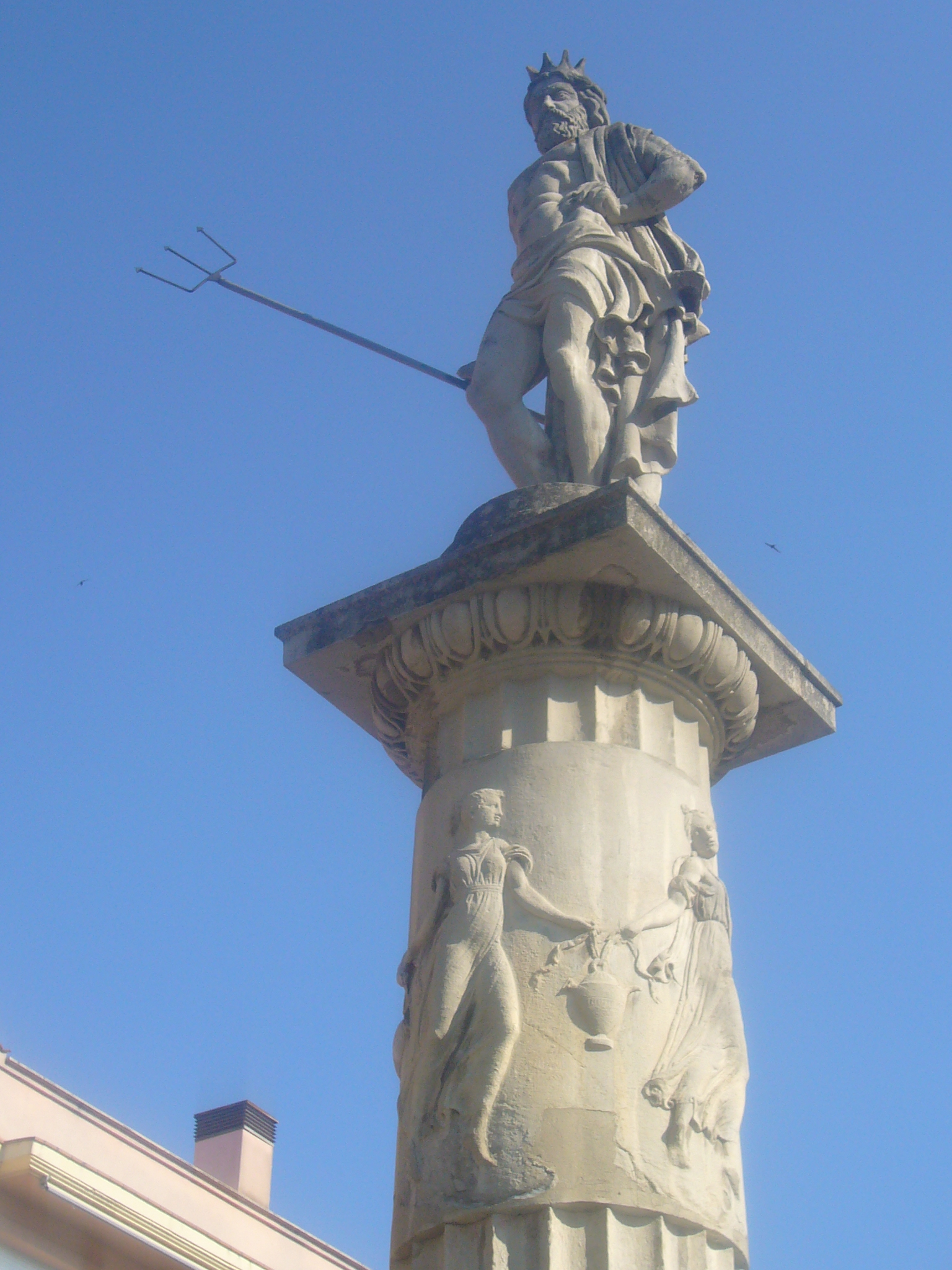
The Fountain of Neptune (1832), Igualada

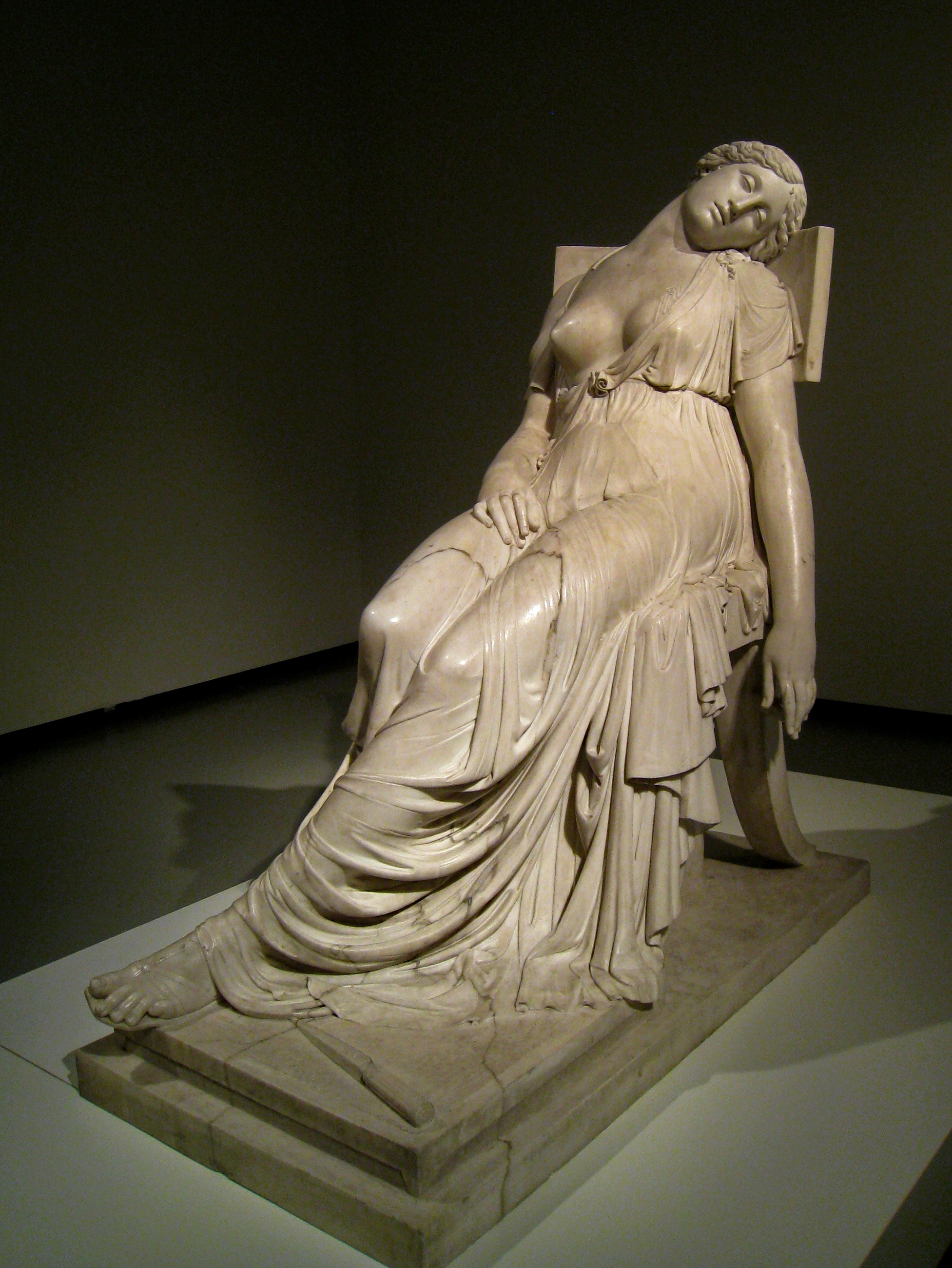
The Death of Lucretia (1833)

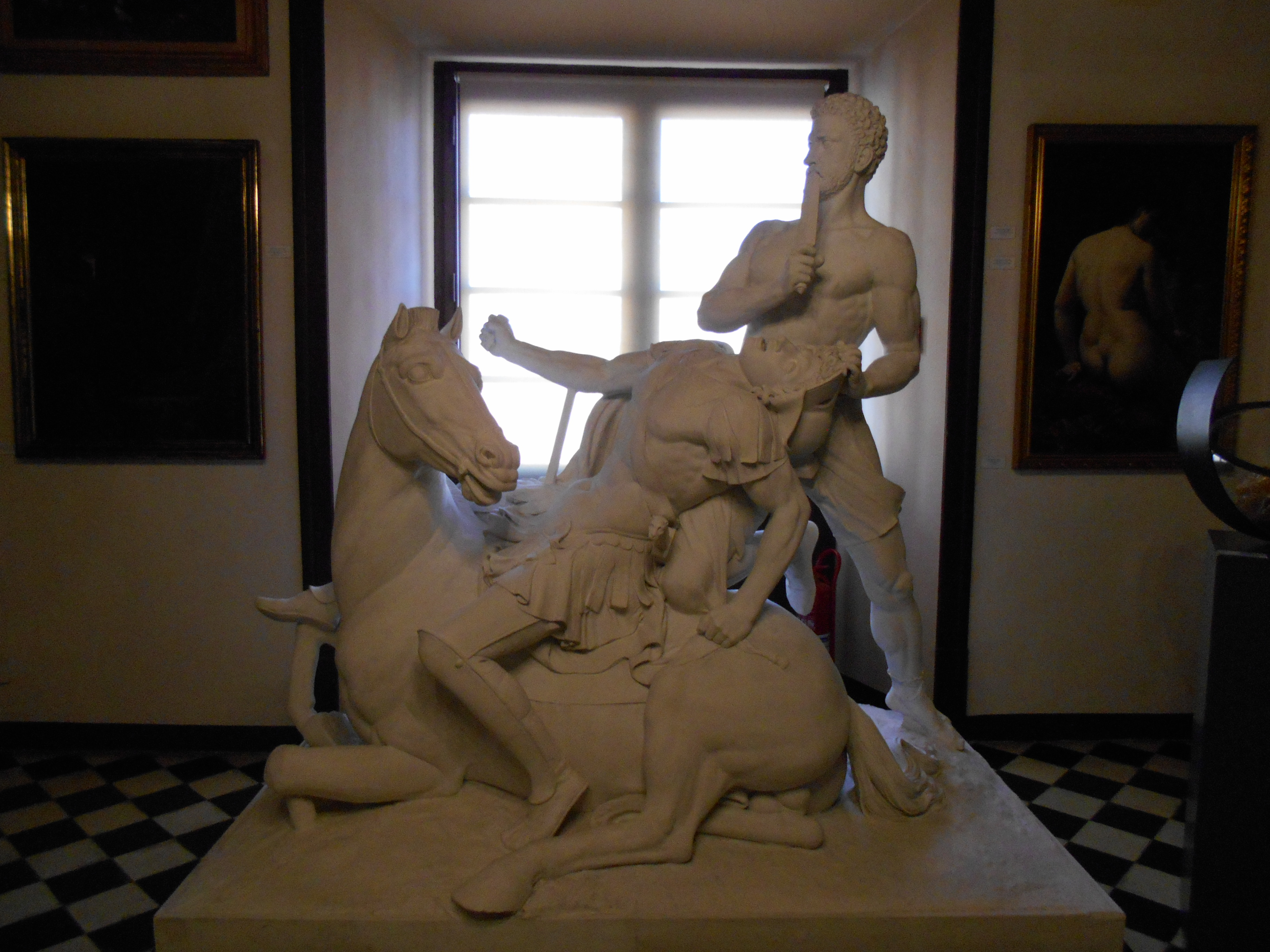
Almogavar Killing a French Horseman (1836)
