= Escola de la Llotja =

Art school in Barcelona, Spain

Coordinates: 41°22′51″N 2°10′39″E

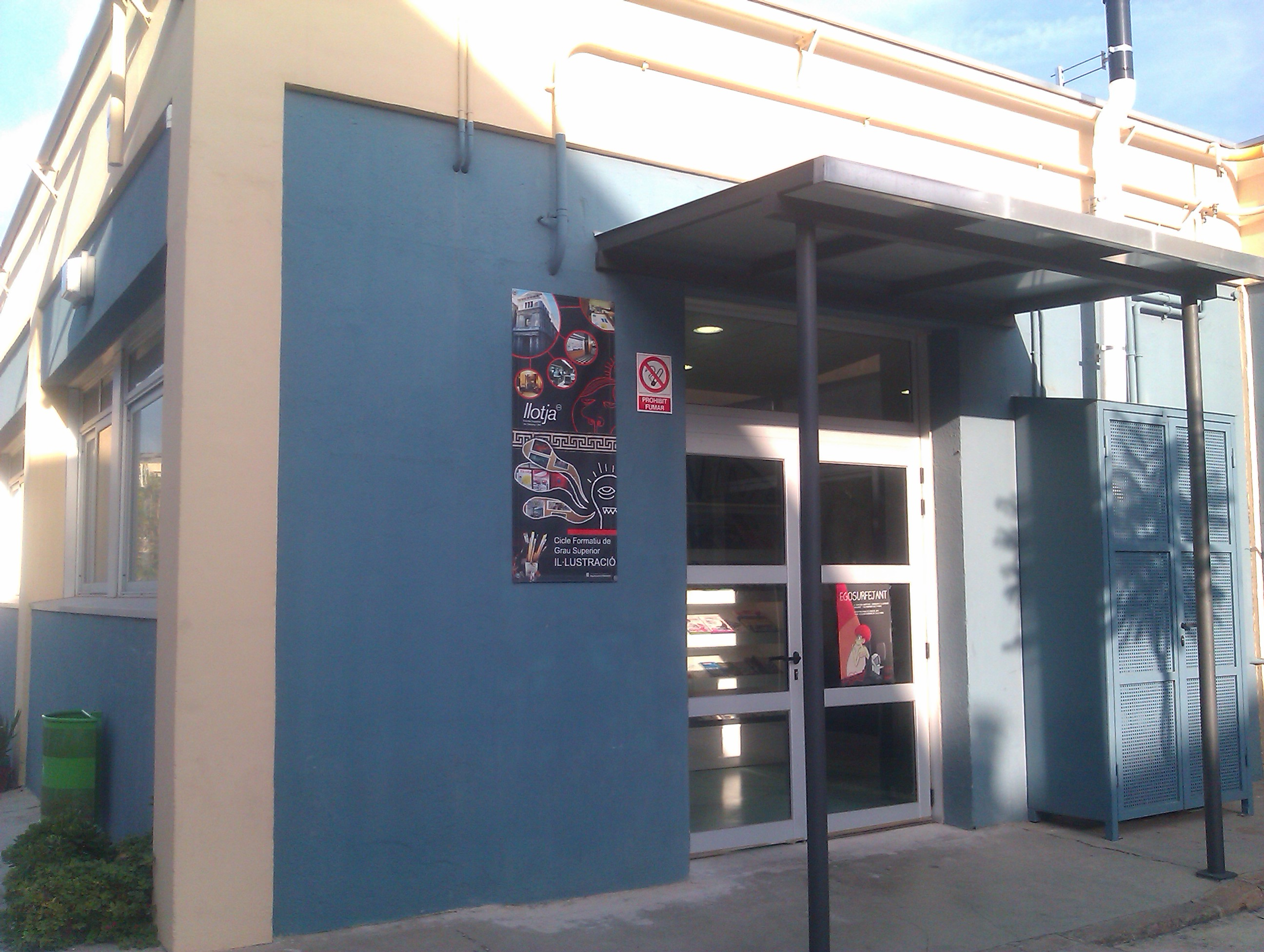
Illustration module at the Llotja buildings in the neighborhood of Sant Andreu in Barcelona

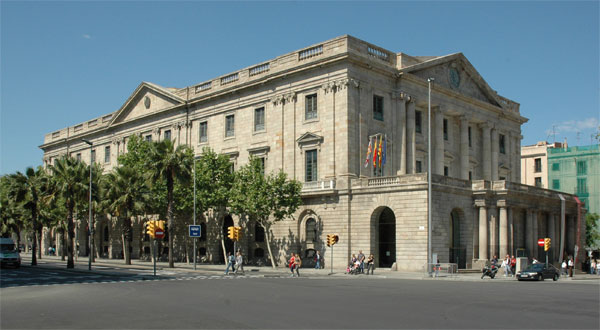
Original location in the Llotja de Mar

The Escola de la Llotja (Catalan pronunciation: [əsˈkɔlə ðə lə ˈʎɔdʒə], "Llotja School"; Spanish: Escuela de la Lonja), officially the Escola d'Arts i Oficis de Barcelona (Barcelona Arts and Crafts School), is an art and design school located in Barcelona, Catalonia, Spain. The school took its name from its initial location in the Llotja de Mar palace; it was moved in 1967 to its current location at 17 Ciutat de Balaguer Street. (It also has a satellite location at 40 Padre Manyanet Street in the Sant Andreu neighborhood.) The first director of the school was Valencian engraver Pedro Pascual Moles, who oriented the school towards academic art advocated by painter Anton Raphael Mengs.

== History ==
The school was founded by the Junta de Comerç de Barcelona in 1775 under the name Escola gratuïta de disseny as a training center for applied art. The school was first oriented around the printing of silk and cotton textiles, and later broadened its scope to include the plastic arts. The period between 1768 and 1787 was a great boom of textile-printing factories, and Barcelona led Europe in textile-printing activity. In 1817, the school added architectural studies to its program of studies.

The school's classes were totally free. Furthermore, scholarships allowed many students to travel to Madrid and other European centers like Rome and Paris for studies, where they typically dedicated themselves to copying grand masters' works, which was a common method of study in that era. The school's focus evolved toward the fine arts and in 1778 its name was changed to Fine Arts School (Escola de Nobles Arts). In 1790, the school expanded with satellite locations in Olot, Palma de Mallorca, Tàrrega, Girona, Saragossa, and Haca. The school organized its first exhibition in 1786 of prize-winning student work; in the next year's exhibition, other non-student artworks were also displayed.

In 1850, the school became dependent on the Acadèmia Provincial de Belles Arts, with the new name Provincial School of Fine Art (Escola Provincial de Belles Arts).

Some renowned figures in the world of arts and design have passed through its classrooms, such as the painters Pablo Picasso, Armando Reverón, Isidre Nonell, Joaquim Mir, Manuel Pallarés, Luis Fraile, Laurent Jiménez-Balaguer, Josep Guinovart, Modest Cuixart, Mariano Fortuny and Joan Hernández Pijuan; sculptors such as Damià Campeny, Domènec Talarn, Agapit Vallmitjana i Abarca, Joan Rebull, Frederic Marès and Jaume Plensa; architects such as Cèsar Martinell and Óscar Tusquets; illustrators such as Lola Anglada, Apeles Mestres and Mercè Llimona; furniture designer such as Joan Busquets i Jané; industrial designers such as Gabriel Teixidó; graphic designers such as Josep Artigues; theorists such as Alexandre Cirici i Pellicer and Arnau Puig, and interior designers such as Miquel García i Riera, amongst others.

Mexican painter Sylvia Ordóñez studied printmaking at the Escola de la Llotja in 1979. Pepita Pardell, Spanish animator, cartoonist, illustrator, and painter, was also a student.

== Notable alumni ==
- Emília Coranty Llurià (1862-1944), painter
- Adelaida Ferré Gomis (1881-1955), lace-maker
- Francesc Daniel Molina i Casamajó (1812-1867), architect
- Òscar Tusquets (1941-), architect
