= Pere Borrell del Caso =

Spanish painter (1835–1910)

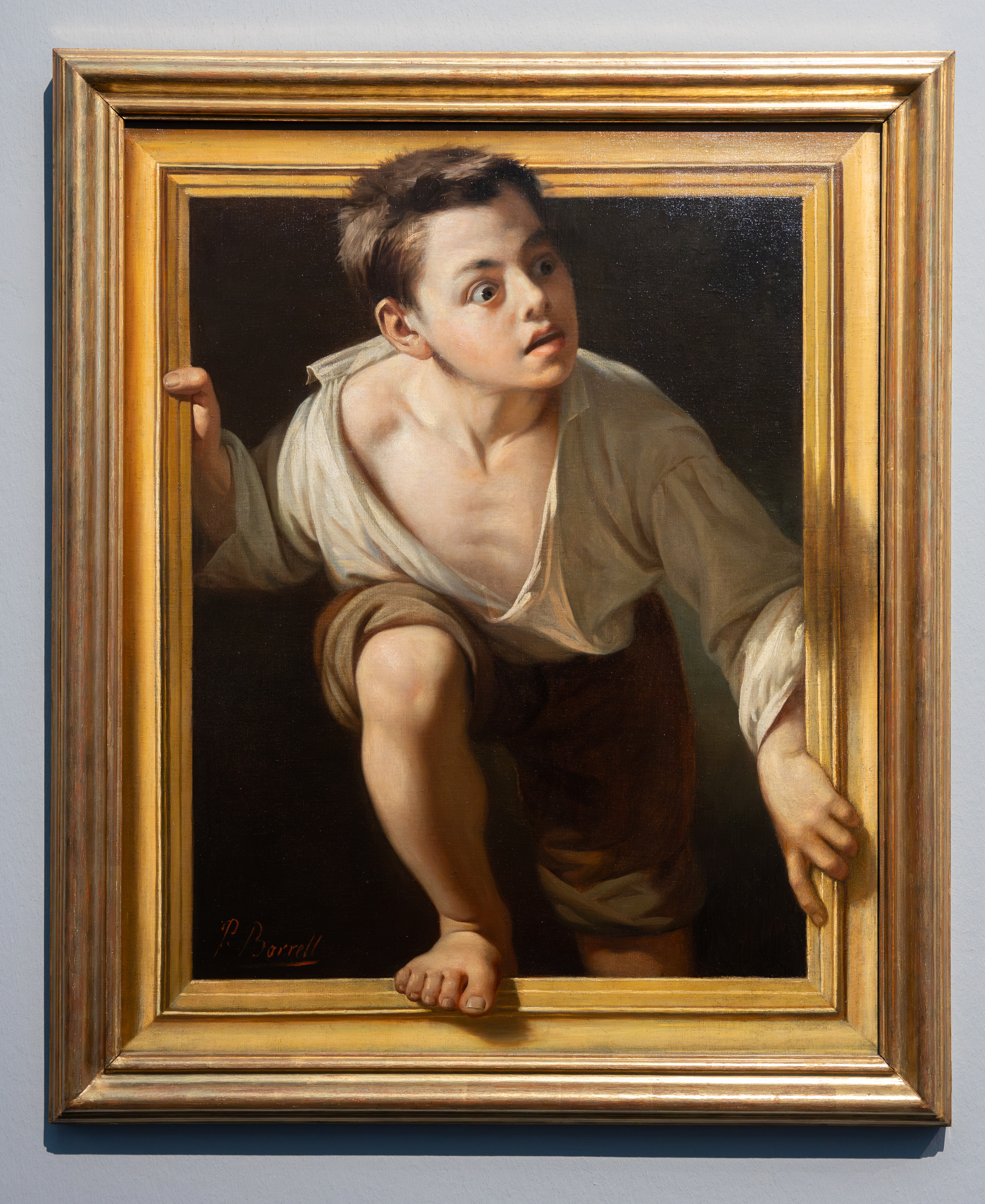
Escaping criticism (1874)

Pere Borrell del Caso (13 December 1835, in Puigcerdà – 16 May 1910, in Barcelona) was a Catalan painter known for his realistic style and his trompe-l'œil paintings, especially Escaping Criticism (1874). He also taught drawing and painting at his own art academy in Barcelona.

== Biography ==
His family had a carpentry workshop in Puigcerdà. After his father died, Borrell had to continue working in the family business. He later worked as a cabinetmaker in Barcelona and saved money to pay for his art studies. He studied at the Escola de la Llotja, an art school in Barcelona. Some of his teachers were Claudi Lorenzale, Lluís Rigalt and Pau Milà i Fontanals.

Borrell was a realist painter who worked in several genres, including portraits, landscapes, religious paintings, still lifes and everyday scenes. He became especially known for his trompe-l'œil paintings, which used visual effects to make painted figures appear to be real. He began to focus on this genre in 1874, following the success of Escaping Criticism, which he exhibited that year.

Pere Borrell took part in group exhibitions in Barcelona from 1866, including exhibitions organised by the Escola de la Llotja, the Society for the Promotion of Art Exhibitions and the Sala Parés. He also took part in the 1878 Exposition Universelle in Paris and in Spanish national fine arts exhibitions.

In 1868, Borrell opened a private drawing academy in Barcelona, and he devoted much of his time to teaching. Three generations of students studied there, and his teaching influenced later generations of Catalan artists. Among Borrell's students were the painters Romà Ribera, Joan Ferrer i Miró and Josep Maria Sert.

Several of Borrell's children also became painters. His sons Ramon and Juli both pursued careers in painting. His daughter Maria also painted.

In 1901, a vascular disease prevented Borrell from continuing to paint. He died in 1910 in Barcelona, at the age of 75.
