= Romà Ribera =

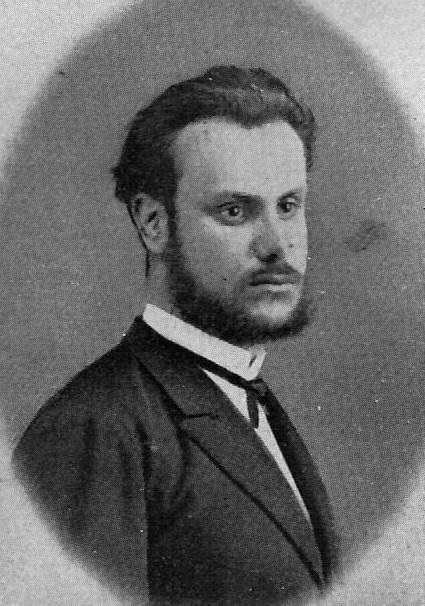
Romà Ribera (c.1885)

Romà Ribera i Cirera (13 December 1848 – 29 May 1935) was a Catalan genre painter. He specialized in contemporary scenes from upper-class social events, rendered in meticulous detail, but also did numerous scenes from life in the 17th and 18th centuries.

== Biography ==
Ribera was born and died in Barcelona. He studied at the Escola de la Llotja and at the private school operated by Pere Borrell del Caso. In 1873, he went to Rome to complete his studies. While there, he met Marià Fortuny, who works would influence his style. After leaving Italy, he visited London to exhibit.

Once he had established himself, he settled in Paris. At a time when most artists were attracted to impressionism, he found inspiration in the works of James Tissot and Alfred Stevens. In 1878, he enjoyed great success at the Exposition Universelle. This enabled him to retain Adolphe Goupil as his agent. To maximize his income, he chose to solicit clients from the upper classes, portraying their activities and possessions.

He had a major showing at the exhibition at the 1888 Barcelona Universal Exposition, where he presented a series of watercolors. He returned to Barcelona in 1889, exhibiting at the Sala Parés. He pursued the same upper class client strategy there that he had in Paris. Occasionally, he travelled to exhibit in Madrid.

In 1902, he became a member of the Reial Acadèmia Catalana de Belles Arts de Sant Jordi and was chosen to sit on the "Catalan Museum Board".

== Selected paintings ==
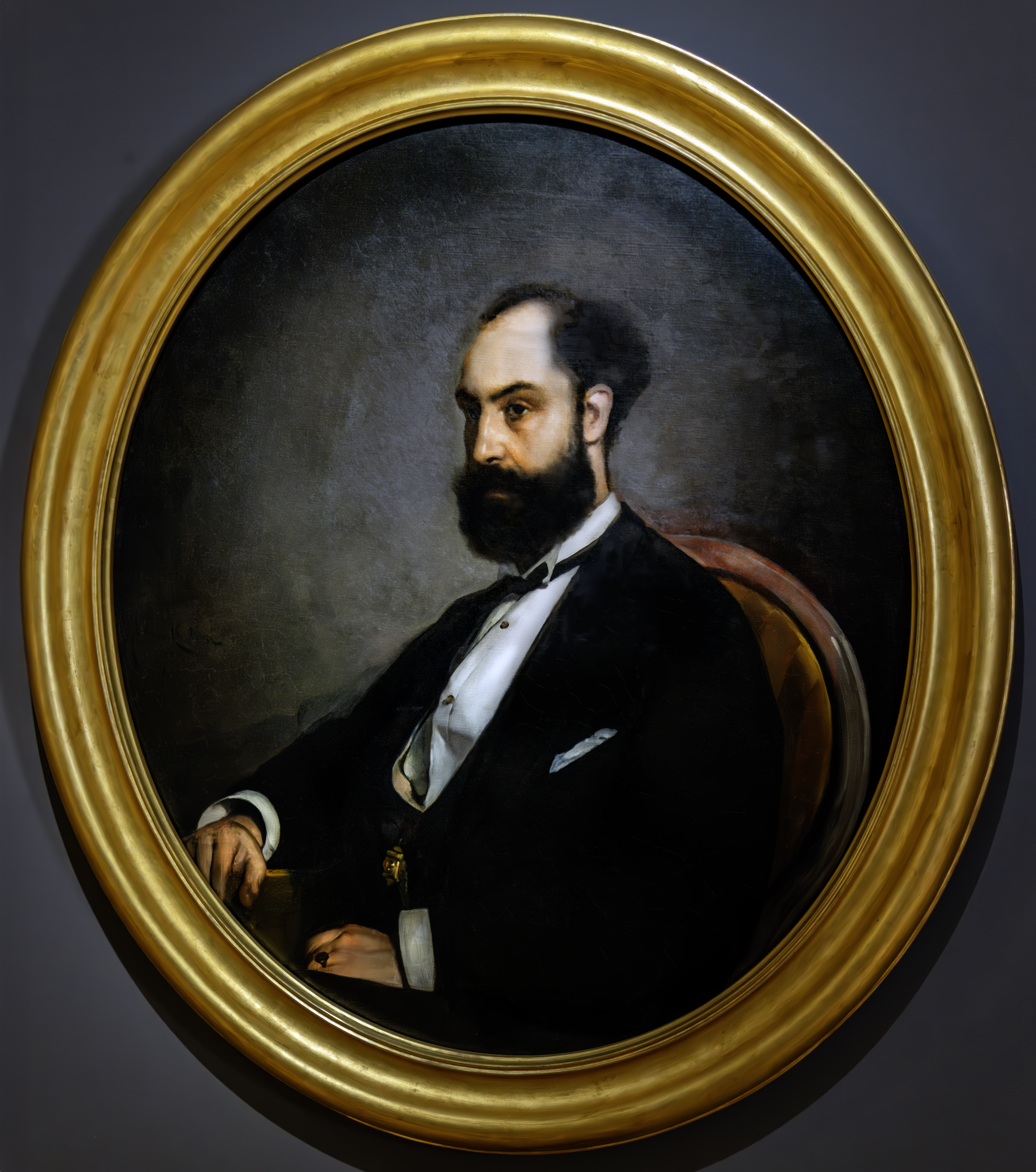
Portrait of Joaquim Ribera i Cirera (1872)

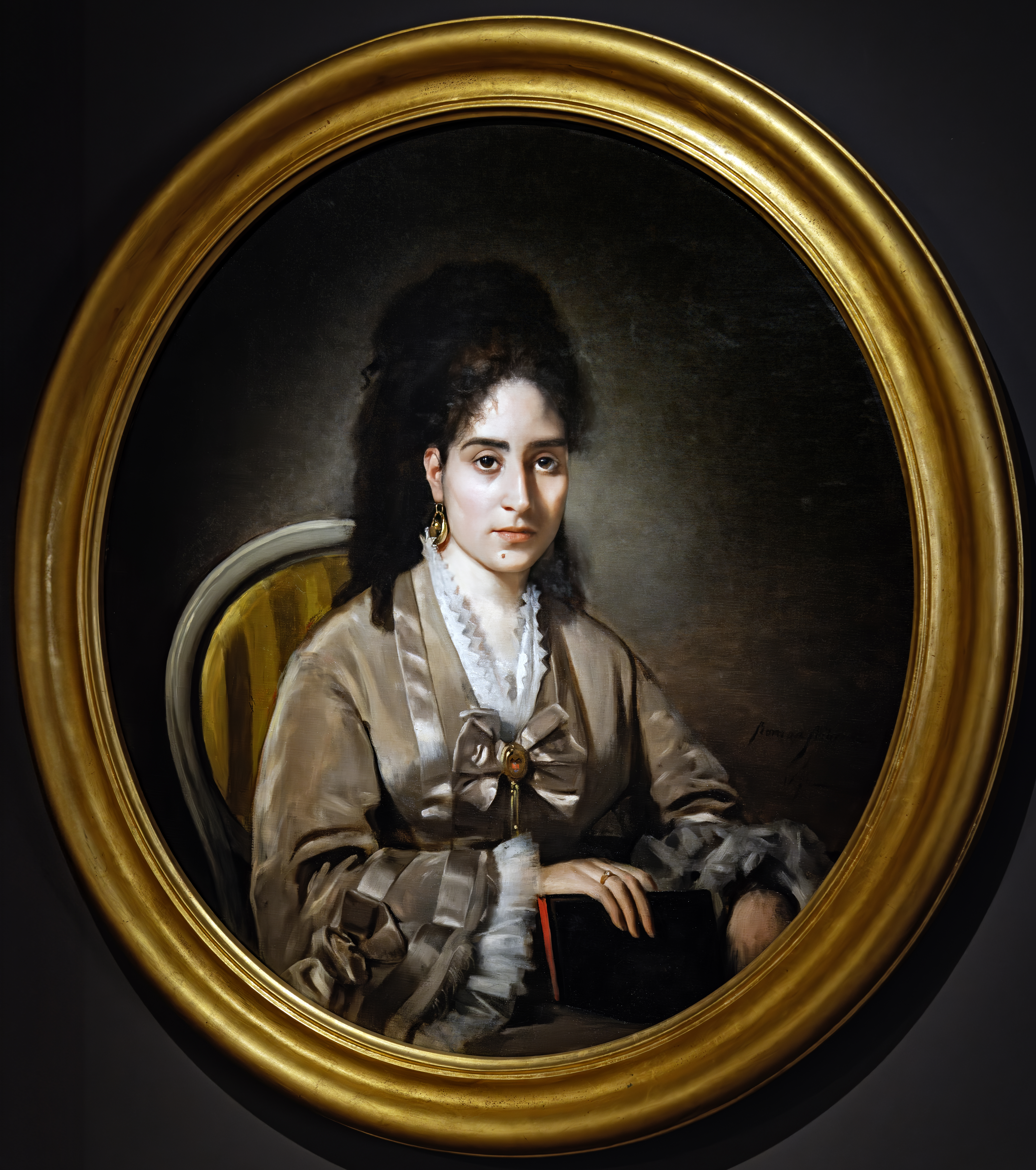
Portrait of Ana Miret y Vidal (1872)

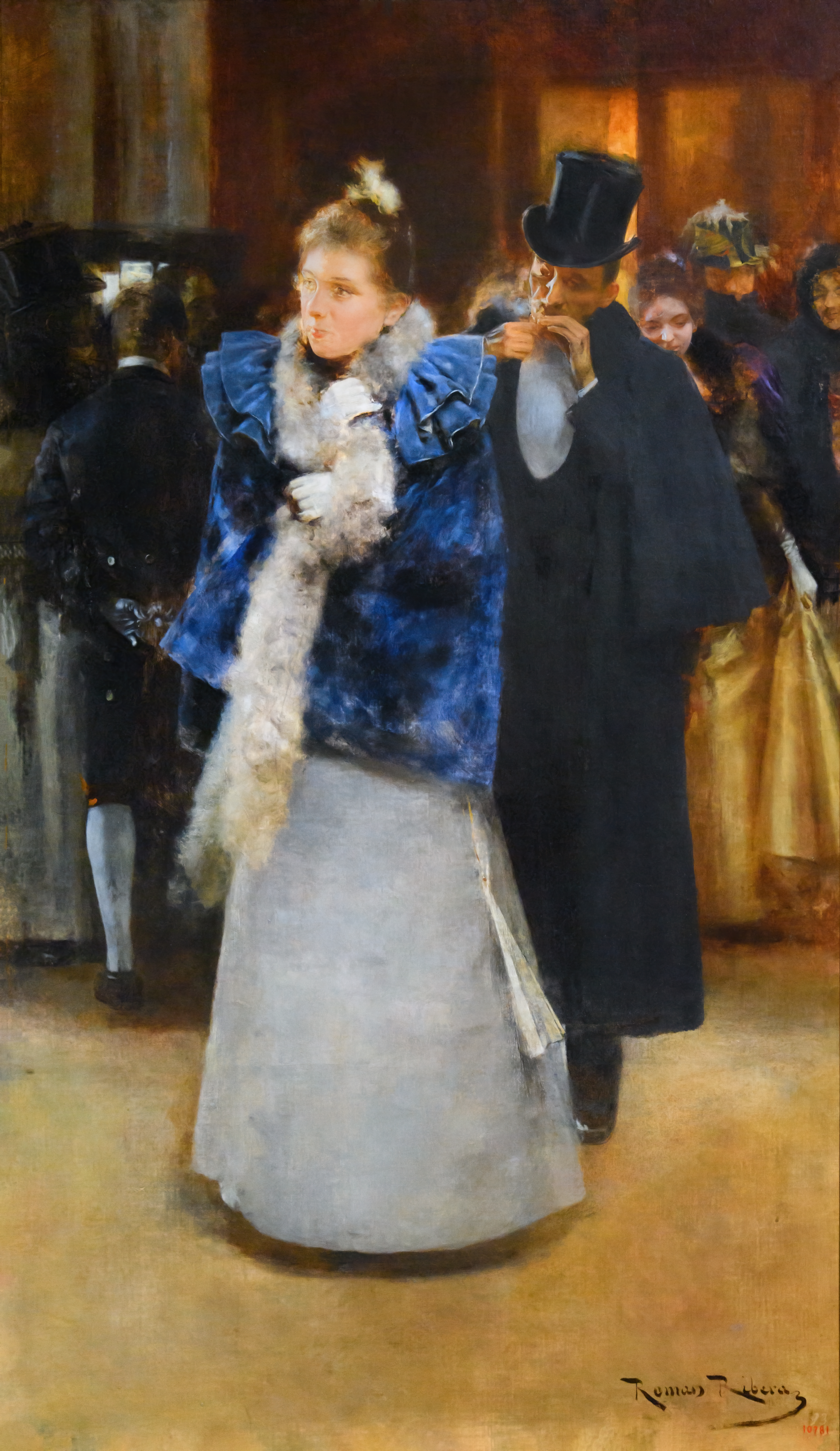
Sortida del ball (1894)

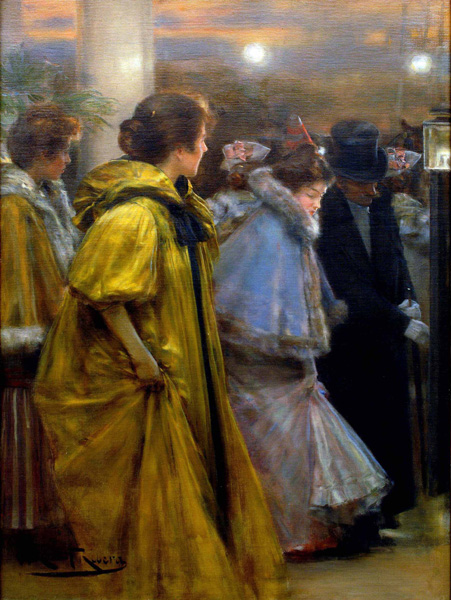
Leaving the Liceu

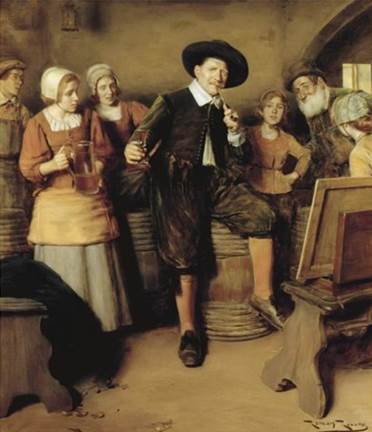
In the Tavern

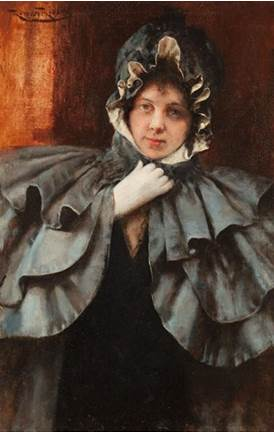
Young Woman

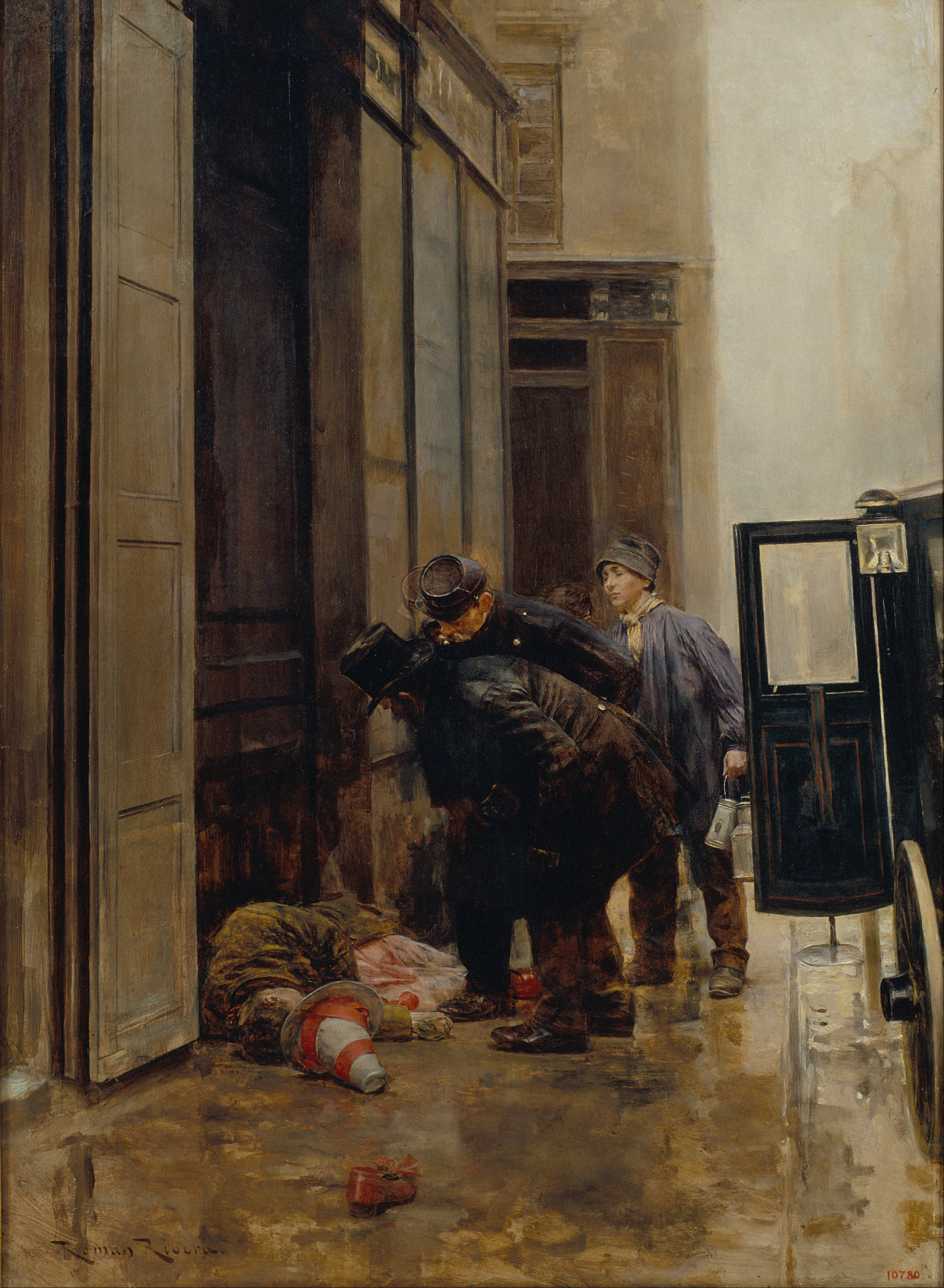
Epilogue to the
Masked Ball

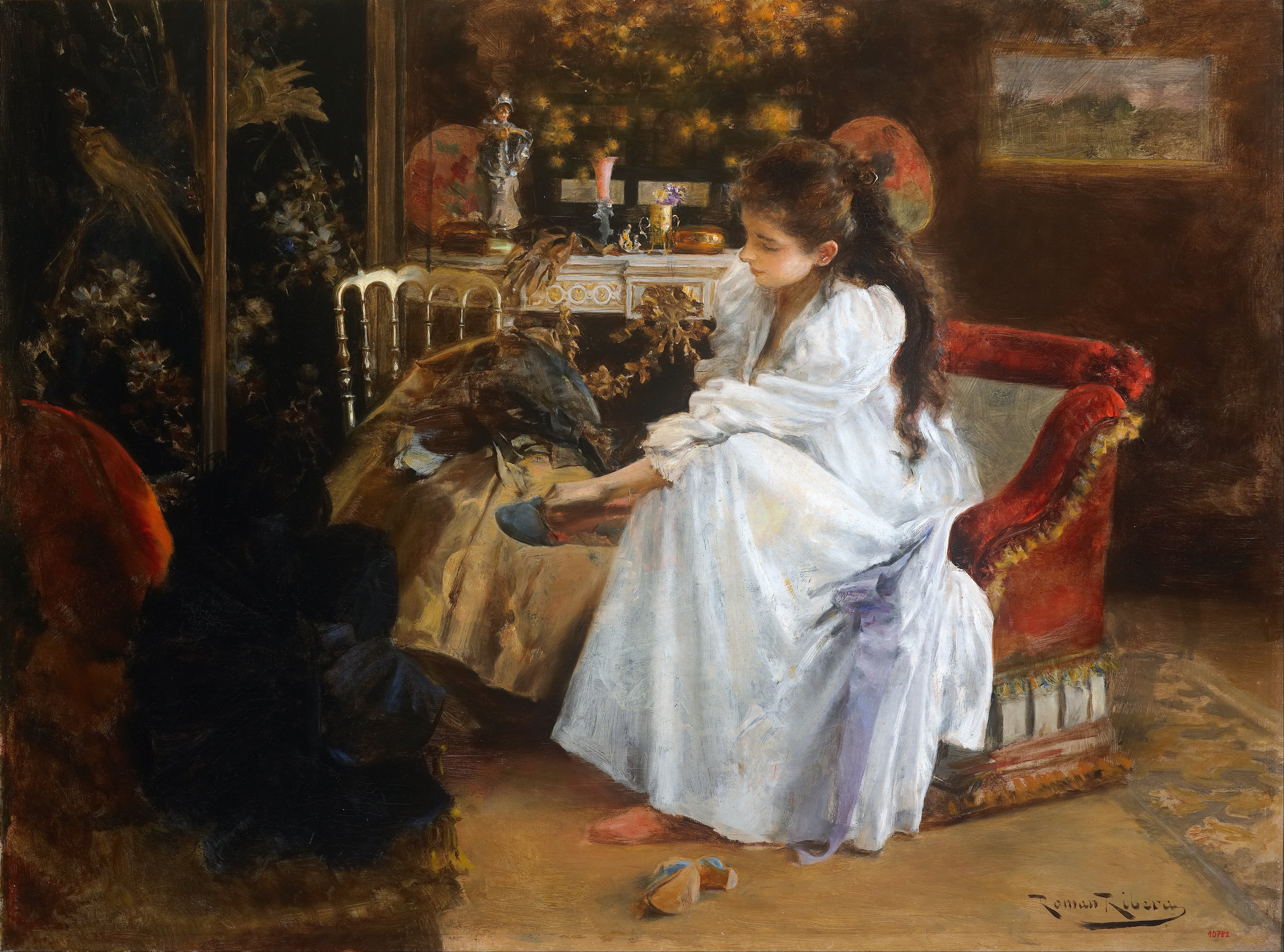
In the Evening
