= Joan Brull =

Spanish painter

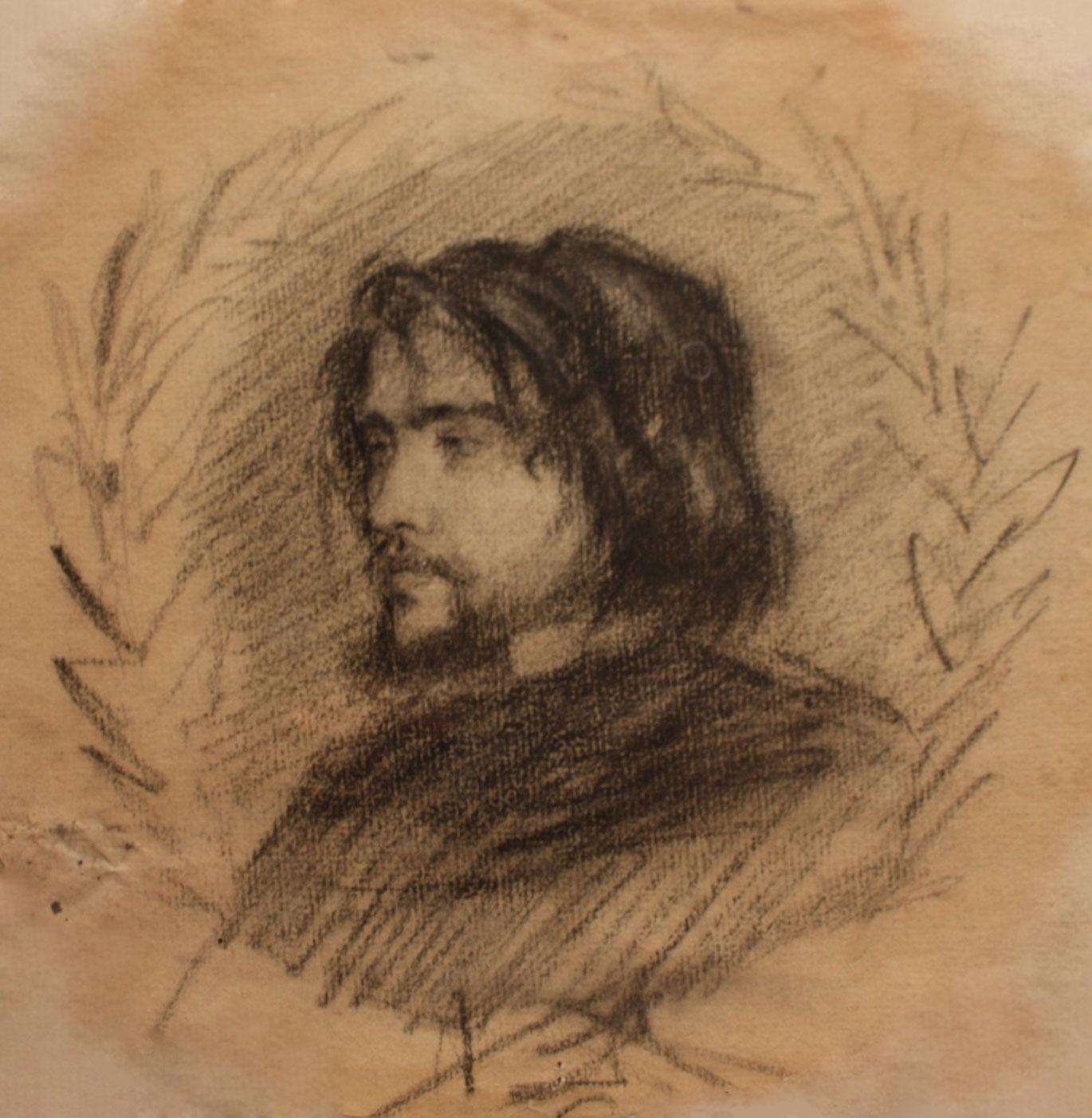
Self-portrait (date unknown)

Joan Brull i Vinyoles (25 January 1863 – 3 February 1912) was a Catalan painter active in the late 19th century. He was a Catalan symbolist painter, along with other artists including Adrià Gual, Josep Maria Tamburini, and Alexandre de Riquer.

== Biography ==
Brull was born in Barcelona, Spain. He studied at the Escola de la Llotja and in Paris. He later worked as an art critic for the magazine Joventut. He participated in a variety of intellectual groups of the era, including the Els Quatre Gats and the Real Círculo Artístico de Barcelona. He was also friends with Ramon Casas and Santiago Rusiñol. In 1896, he won first place in the International Exposition of Barcelona with his work Ensomni.

In 2009, the Caixa Foundation Girona put on a retrospective exhibition in its Fontana d'Or Center, which featured over 40 works by Brull. Two other solo exhibitions were dedicated to him: in 1924 and in 1959.

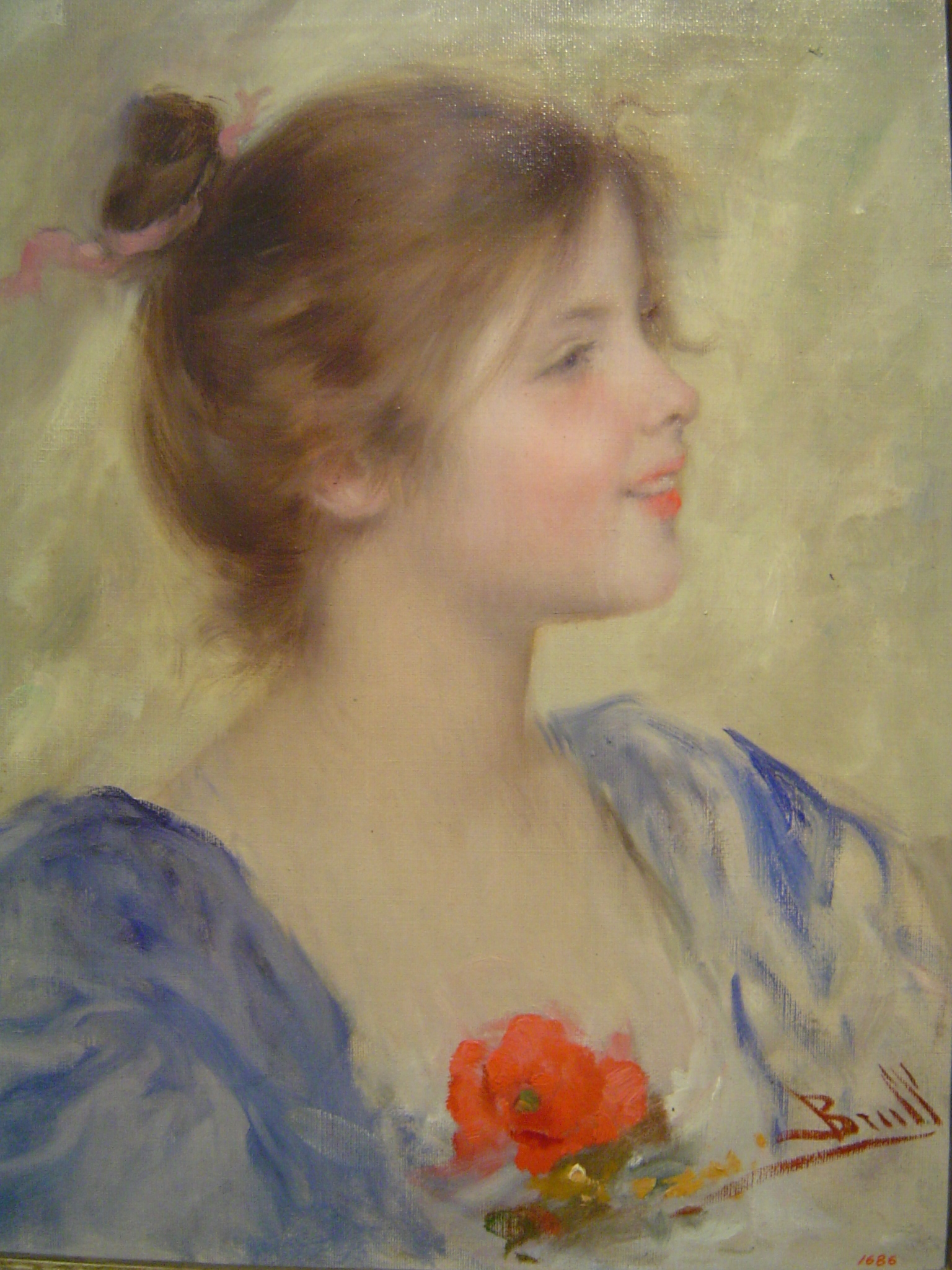
Retrato de Niña, 1912

Brull's early work is realistic, but later in his career he focused on symbolism, including representations of (typically female) mythological characters. He is also known for his many portraits, the majority of which were of children and beggars in Barcelona in the later 19th century.

=== Representative works ===
- La tonsura del rei Wamba
- Ensomni
- Sueño (in the Museu Nacional d'Art de Catalunya)
- Retrato de Niña (in the Biblioteca Museo Víctor Balaguer)

== Gallery ==
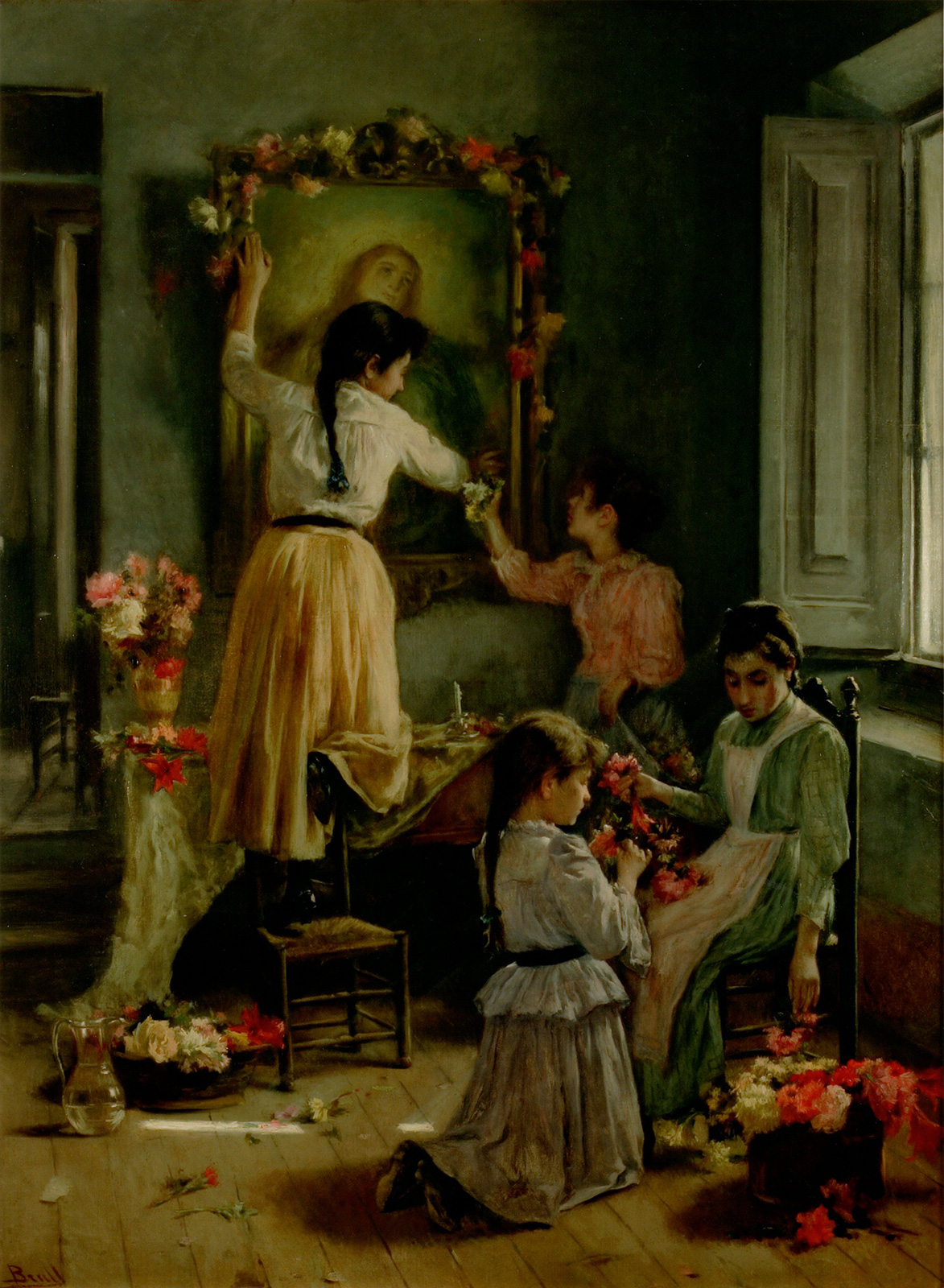
Month of Mary

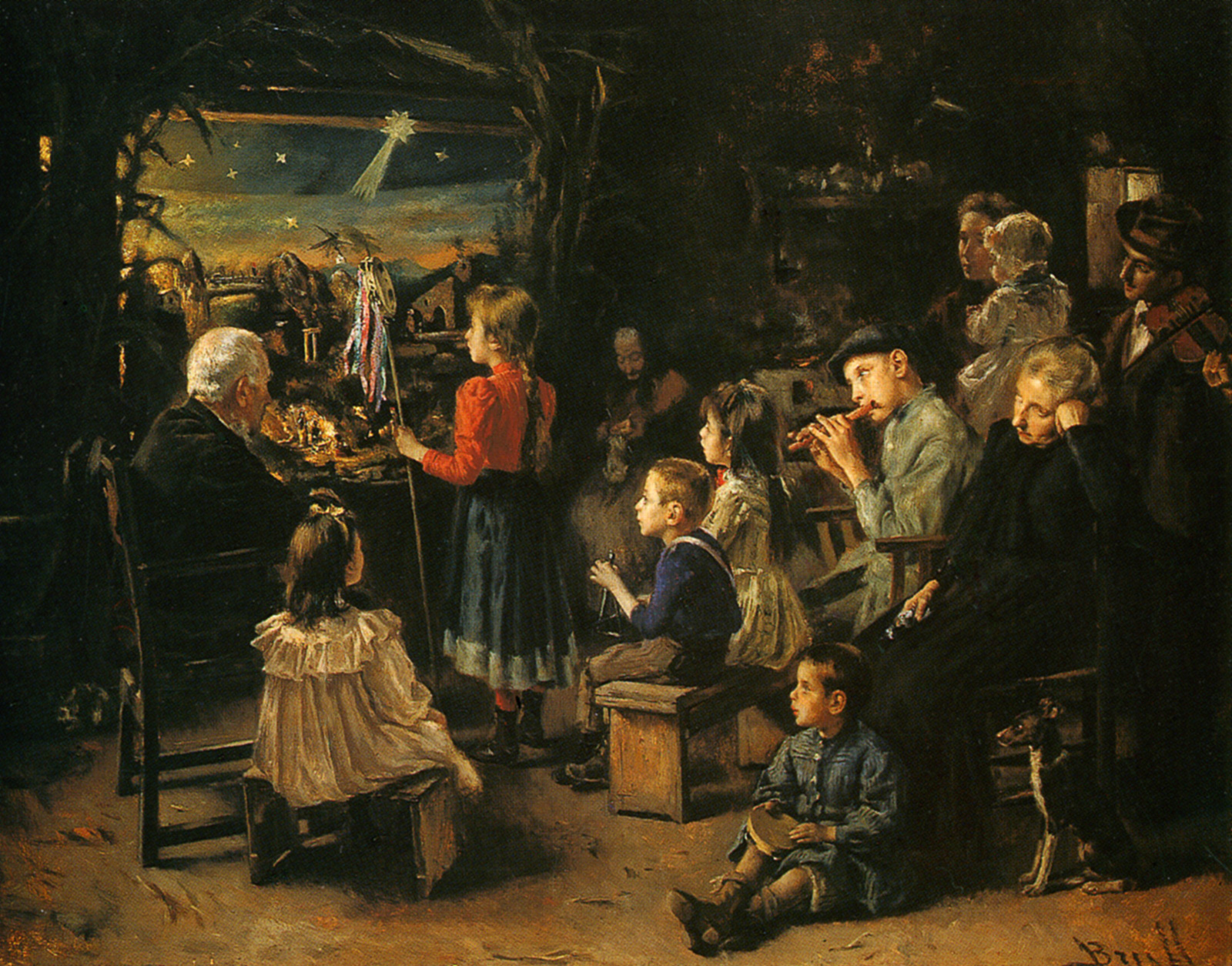
The Nativity

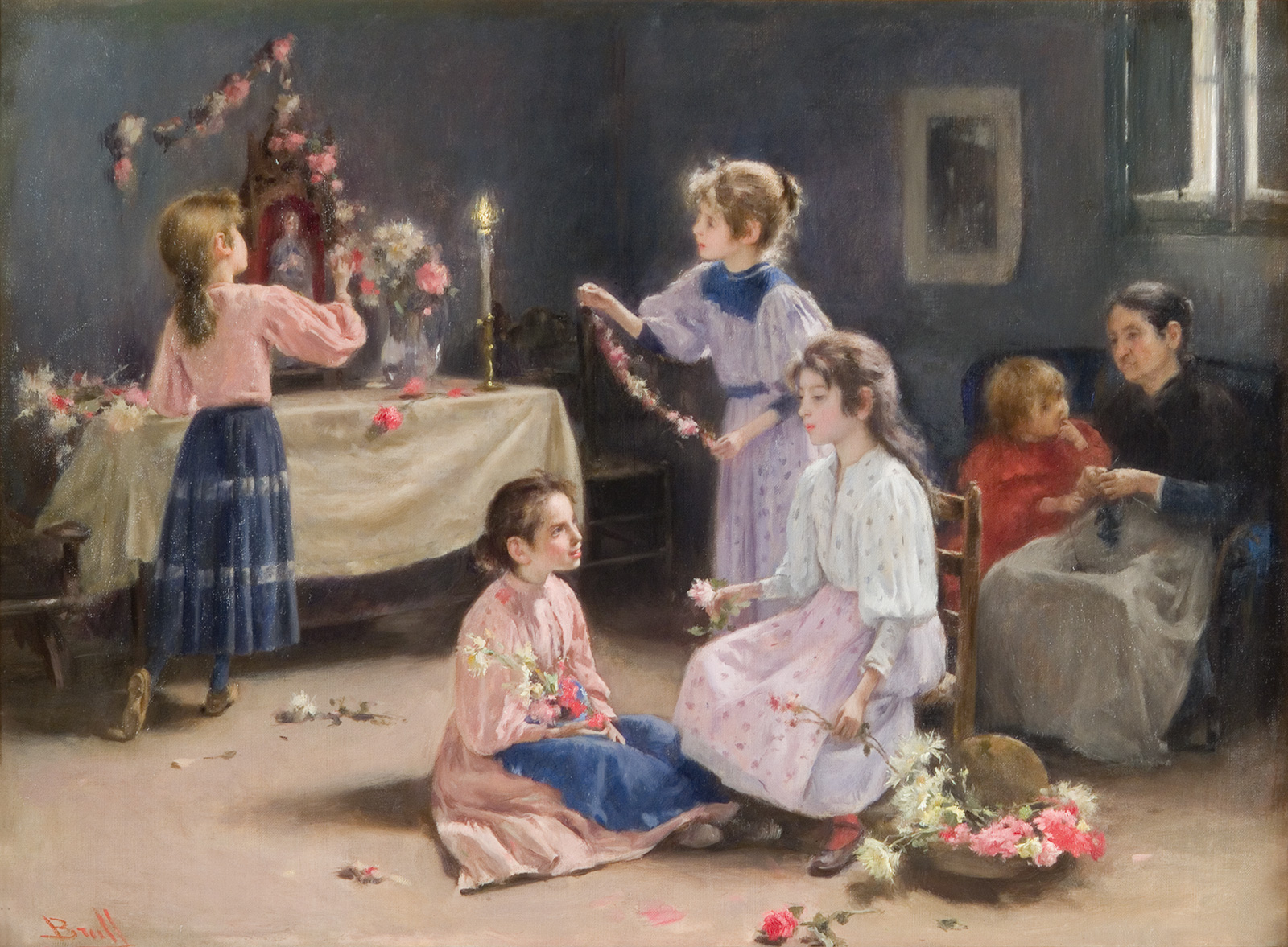
Month of Mary

== Other sources ==
- Guia del Museu Nacional d'Art de Catalunya. Editat pel MNAC, 2004. ISBN 84-8043-136-9
- Socías, Jaume (1982). Modernisme a Catalunya (in Catalan). Barcelona, Ed. Nou Art Tgor. ISBN 84-7327-052-5.
