= Antoni Caba =

Spanish painter (1838–1907)

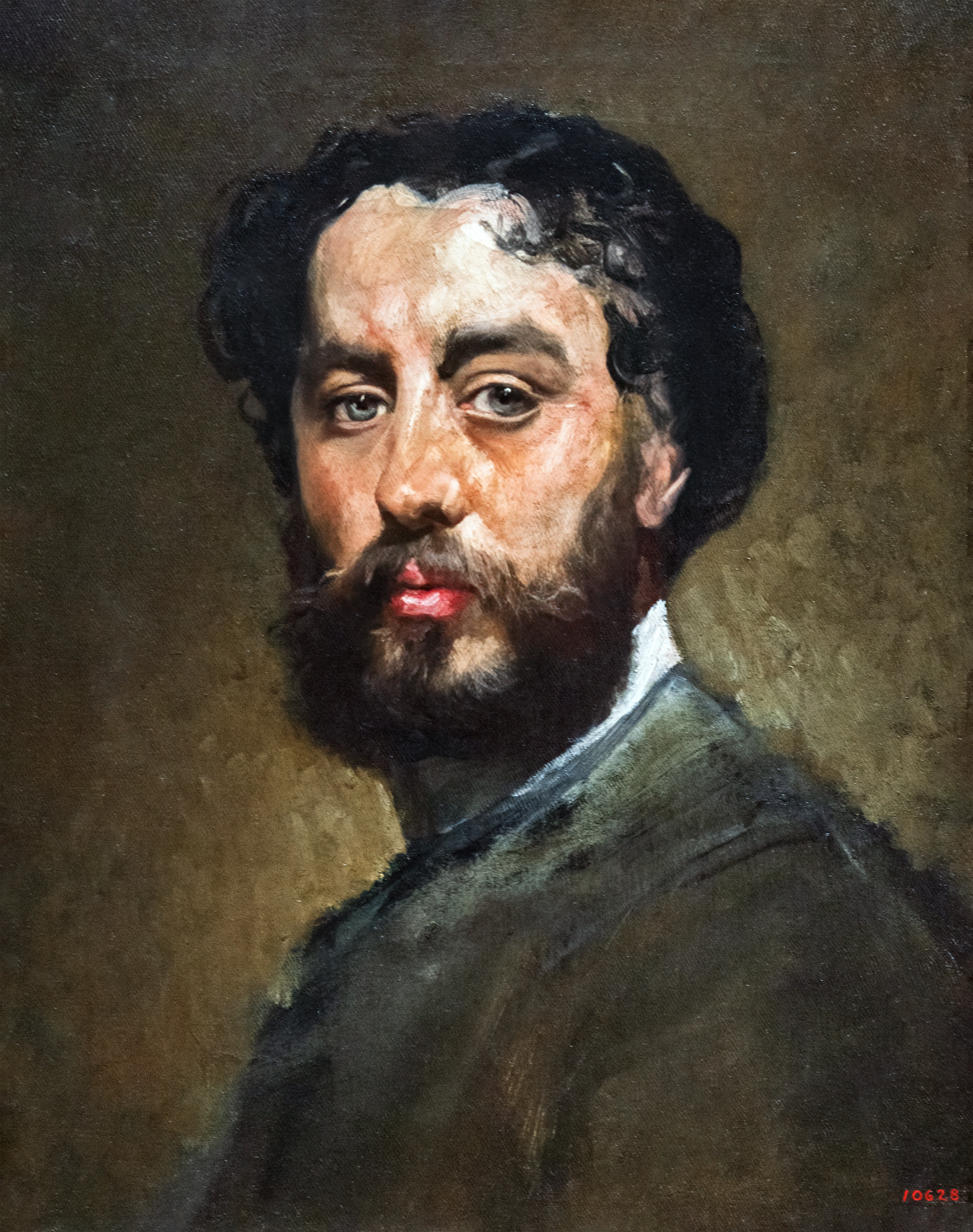
Self-portrait (c.1875–1880)

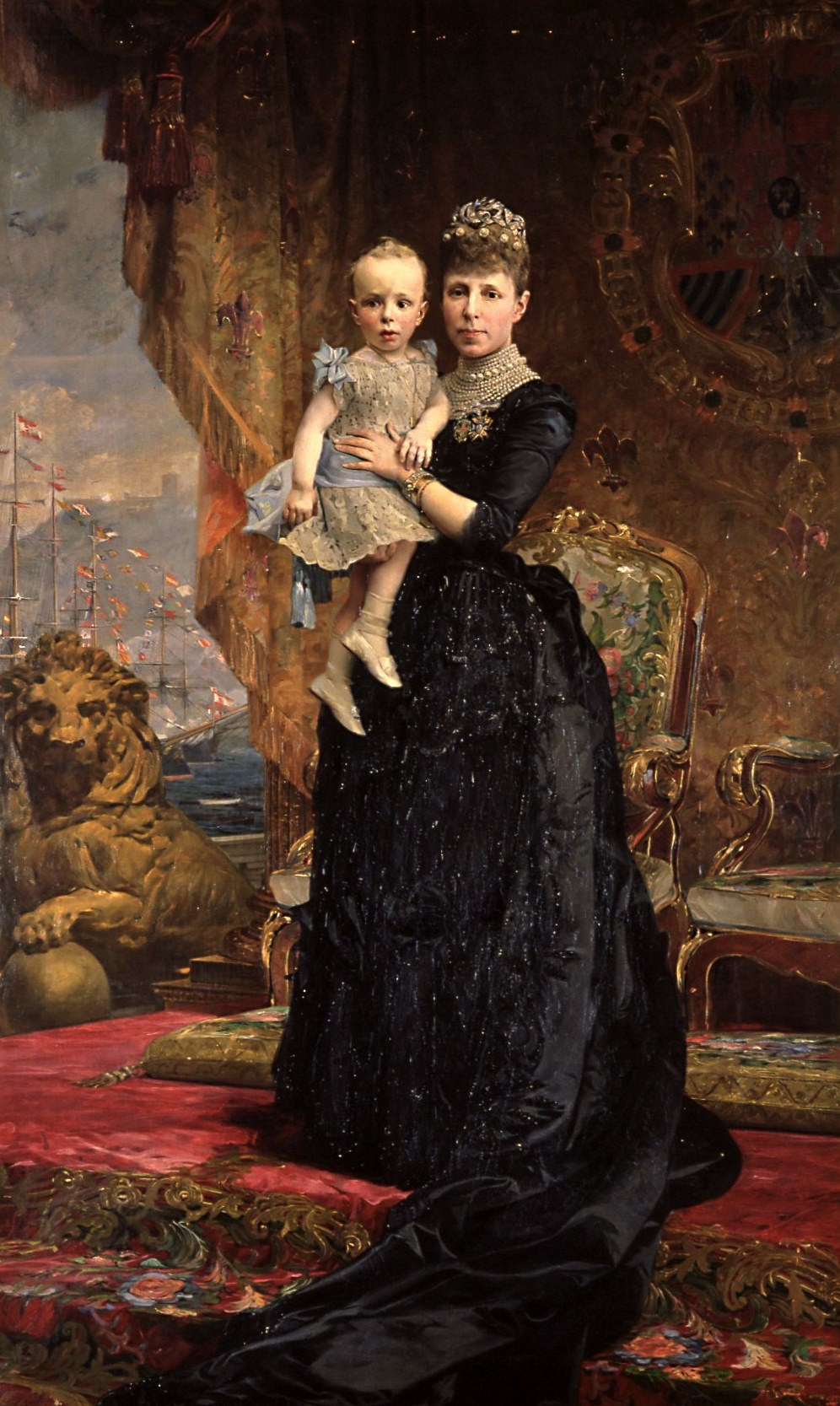
Queen Maria Cristina holding her son, King Alfonso XIII (1890)

Antoni Caba i Casamitjana (1838 – 25 January 1907) was a Spanish painter who worked in the Realistic style and is best known for his portraits.

== Biography ==
Antoni Caba was born in Barcelona. He attended the Escola de la Llotja during the 1850s, where he studied with Pau Milà i Fontanals and Claudi Lorenzale. Supported by a stipend from the school board, he later attended the Real Academia de Bellas Artes de San Fernando in Madrid, where his primary instructor was Federico de Madrazo. His first exhibition came in 1864, at the National Exhibition of Fine Arts. The government bought one of his works for the collection of the Museo del Prado.

For a short time, he was enrolled at the Académie des Beaux-Arts in Paris, where he studied under the direction of the Swiss painter, Charles Gleyre. In 1874, he obtained a teaching position as "Professor of Color and Composition" at the Escola and served as the Director from 1887 to 1901. During this time, he dedicated himself to creating portraits for middle-class clients in Catalonia; especially Barcelona, for which he received the nickname "fotográficos".

In addition to his portraits, he created decorative murals in the Gran Teatro del Liceo and several private residences. He died in Barcelona on January 25, 1907.
