= Tomàs Padró =

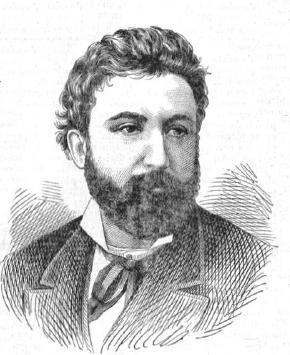
Tomàs Padró (1877); from La Llumanera de Nova York

Tomàs Padró i Pedret (11 February 1840 in Barcelona – 16 April 1877 in Barcelona) was a Catalan painter, graphic artist and illustrator.

== Biography ==
He was born to a family of artists. His father, Ramon Padró i Pijoan, was a sculptor. His younger brother, Ramon, also became a painter. He studied at the Escola de la Llotja with Claudi Lorenzale, then at the Real Academia de Bellas Artes de San Fernando in Madrid, where his instructors included Carlos Luis de Ribera and Federico de Madrazo. His fellow student, Marià Fortuny, introduced him to the drawings of Paul Gavarni.

In 1867, he went to France with the writer, Francisco José Orellana, to illustrate his work La Exposición Universal de París. In 1868, he painted the stained glass windows in the apse of the church of Santa Maria del Pi and a portrait of the abbess at the convent of San Juan de Jerusalén. The following year, he entered and won a competition for a position as Professor of drawing at the school for deaf-mutes. He taught there, periodically, until his resignation in 1875.

The peak period of his work as an illustrator coincided with the "Glorious Revolution" of 1868. He married in 1870, and had three children. During the short reign of King Amadeo I, he lived in Cartagena, where he worked as an artistic correspondent for La Ilustración Española y Americana.

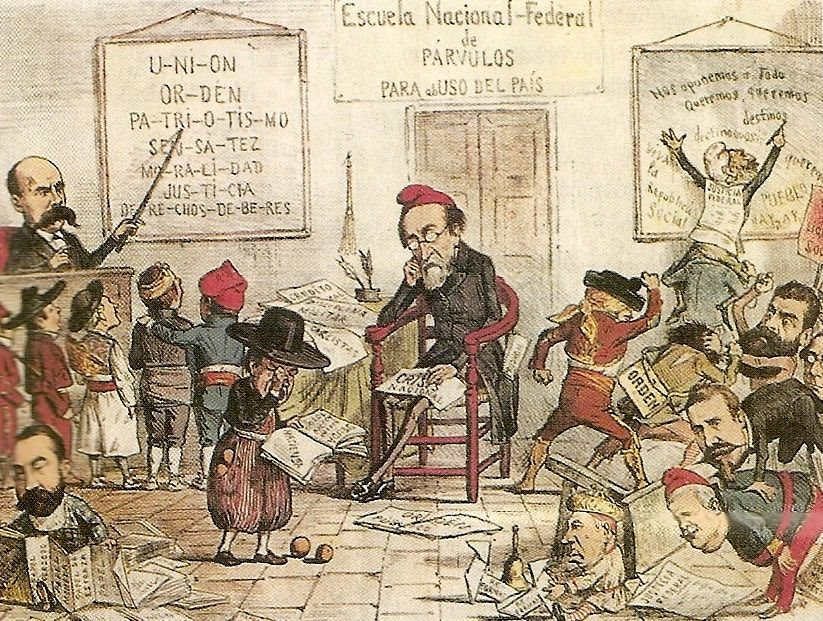
From La Flaca: A satire on the short-lived First Spanish Republic. Emilio Castelar (at the lectern) and Francisco Pi y Margall (on the chair), were its two presidents.

His most significant book illustrations were for La Historia de España, by Modesto Lafuente, and his best remembered journalistic drawings were for the satirical magazine, La Flaca. Also notable were those for El Museo Universal and La Campana de Gracia; as well as for magazines outside Spain, such as L'Illustration, the Illustrirte Zeitung and Le Monde Illustré.
