= Josep Maria Tamburini =

Spanish painter and art critic (1856–1932)

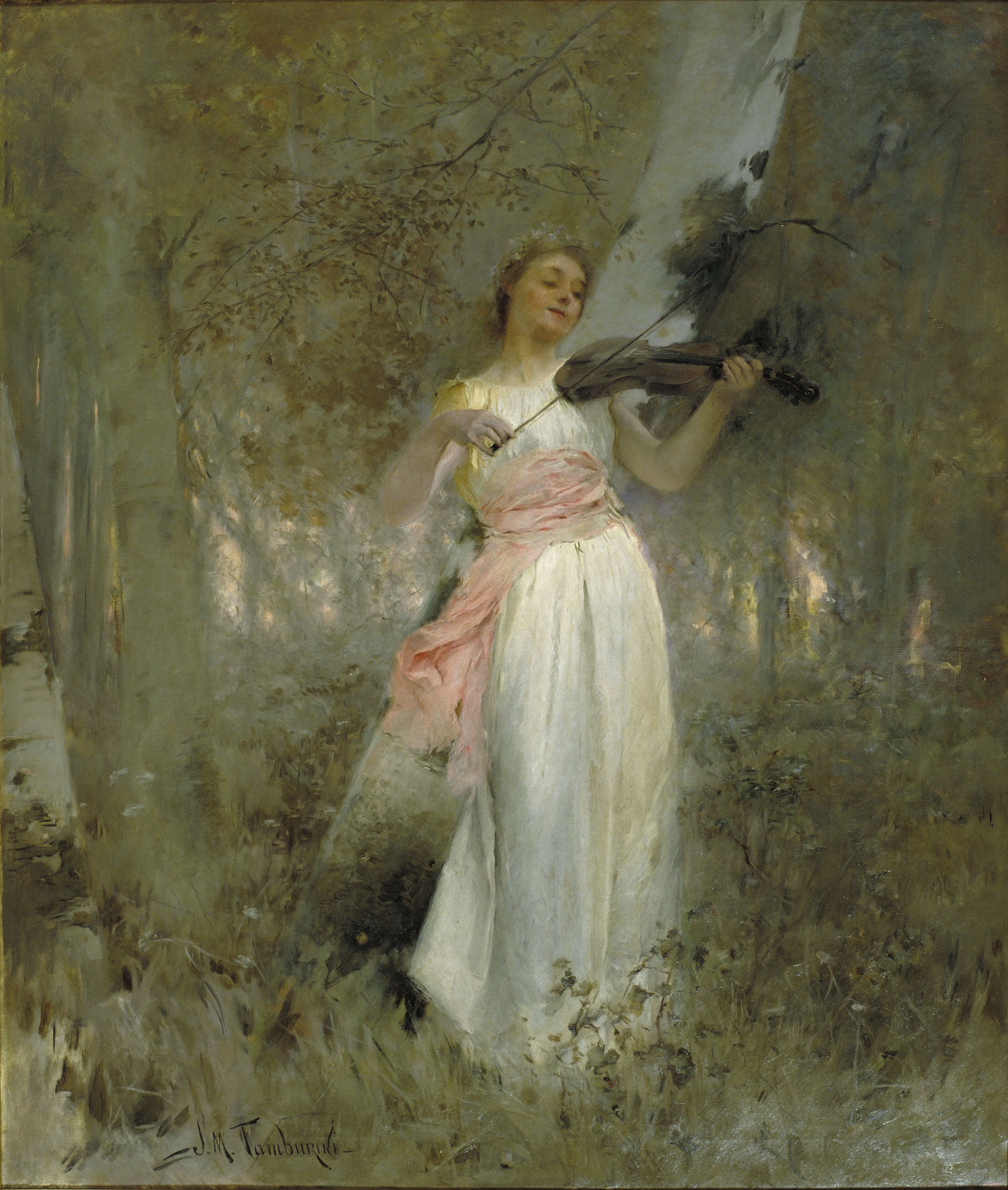
Woodland Harmonies

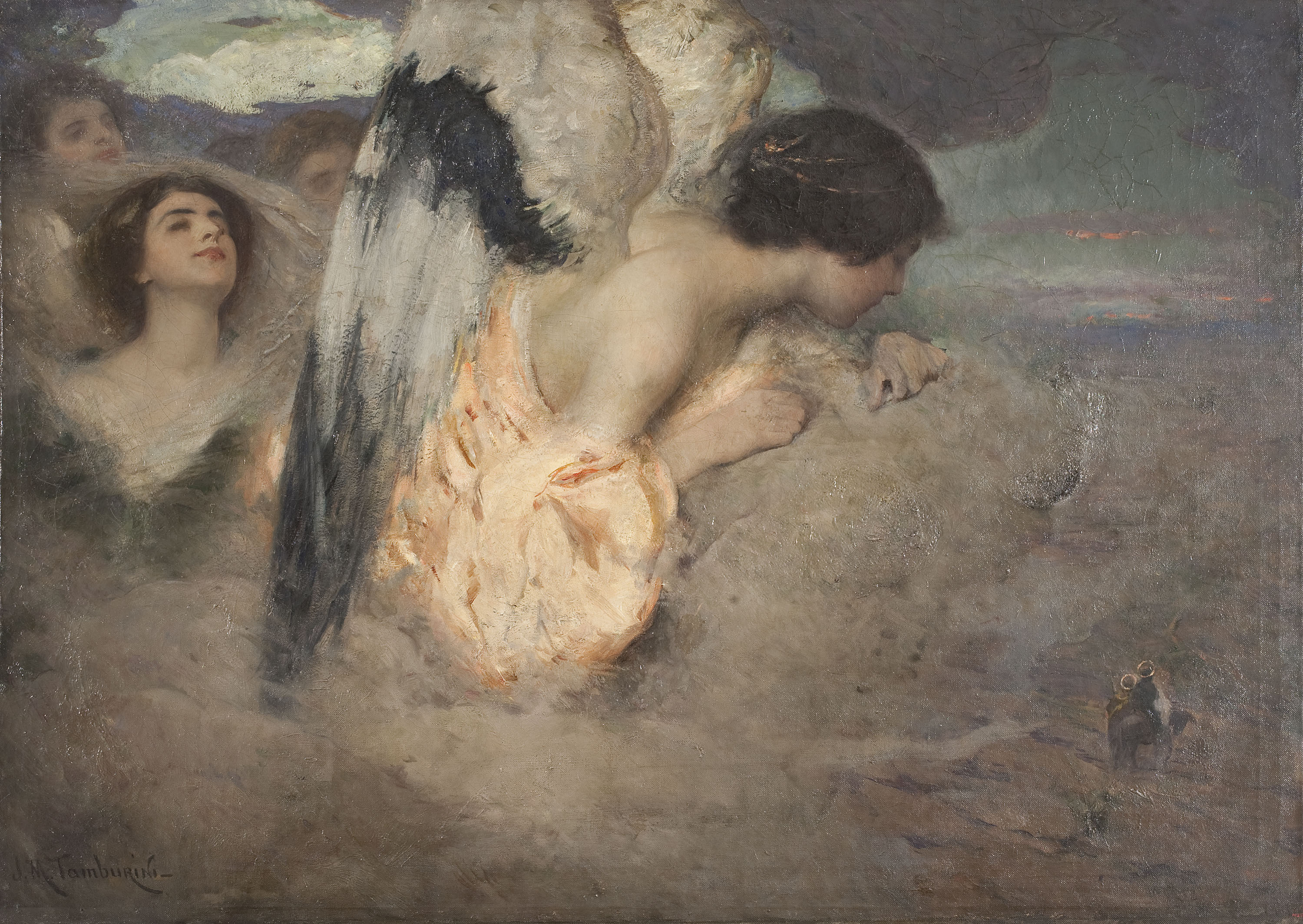
The Flight into Egypt

Josep Maria Tamburini i Dalmau (4 December 1856, Barcelona – 1932, Barcelona) was a Catalan art critic and painter, in the Symbolist style.

== Biography ==
His father, Celestí Tamburini i Valls, was a silversmith. He studied at the Escola de la Llotja with Antoni Caba, then went to Paris, where he worked with Léon Bonnat. Later, he went to Rome and Naples; coming under the influence of Domenico Morelli and Gioacchino Toma.

After returning to Barcelona, he published articles, reviews and drawings in La Vanguardia and L'Avenç, and began showing his paintings at the Sala Parés. In 1888, he was awarded a silver medal at the Barcelona Universal Exposition.

He initially devoted himself to historical works, but moved away from Realism to a type of Symbolism and developed an interest in the English Pre-Raphaelites. As a result, much of his work took on a "literary" quality.

On various occasions, he participated in the Exposiciones Nacionales de Bellas Artes in Madrid and was a member of the Junta de Museus de Catalunya (Museum Board) as well as teaching at the Escola. In 1900, he was one of the co-founders of the "Societat Artística i Literària de Catalunya". He continued to contribute to various periodicals throughout his life.

His works may be seen at the MNAC, the Galeria de Catalans Il·lustres and the Biblioteca Museu Víctor Balaguer in Vilanova i la Geltrú, among others.

== Sources ==
- Mònica Maspoch, Galeria d'autors : ruta del modernisme, Barcelona, Institut del Paisatge Urbà i la Qualitat de Vida, 2008, p. 201. ISBN 978-84-96696-02-0
- Biography @ the Gran Enciclopèdia Catalana
