= 1888 Barcelona Universal Exposition =

World's Fair held in Barcelona, Spain in 1888

1888 Barcelona
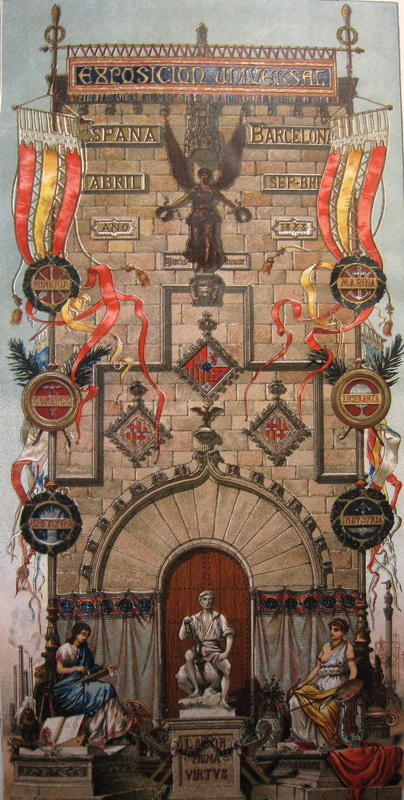
- Official Poster

Overview
- BIE-class: Universal exposition
- Category: Historical Expo
- Name: Exposició Universal de Barcelona / Exposición Universal de Barcelona
- Building(s): Arc de Triomf
- Area: 46.5 ha
- Visitors: 2.300.000
- Organized by: Tomàs Moragas (artistic director)

Participant(s)
- Countries: 30

Location
- Country: Spain
- City: Barcelona
- Venue: Parc de la Ciutadella
- Coordinates: 41°23′17″N 2°11′15″E

Timeline
- Opening: 8 April 1888
- Closure: 10 December 1888

Universal expositions
- Previous: Melbourne International Exhibition (1880) in Melbourne
- Next: Exposition Universelle (1889) in Paris

The 1888 Barcelona Universal Exposition (in Catalan: Exposició Universal de Barcelona and Exposición Universal de Barcelona in Spanish) was Spain's first International World's Fair and ran from 8 April to 9 December 1888. The second one in Barcelona was held in 1929.

== Summary ==
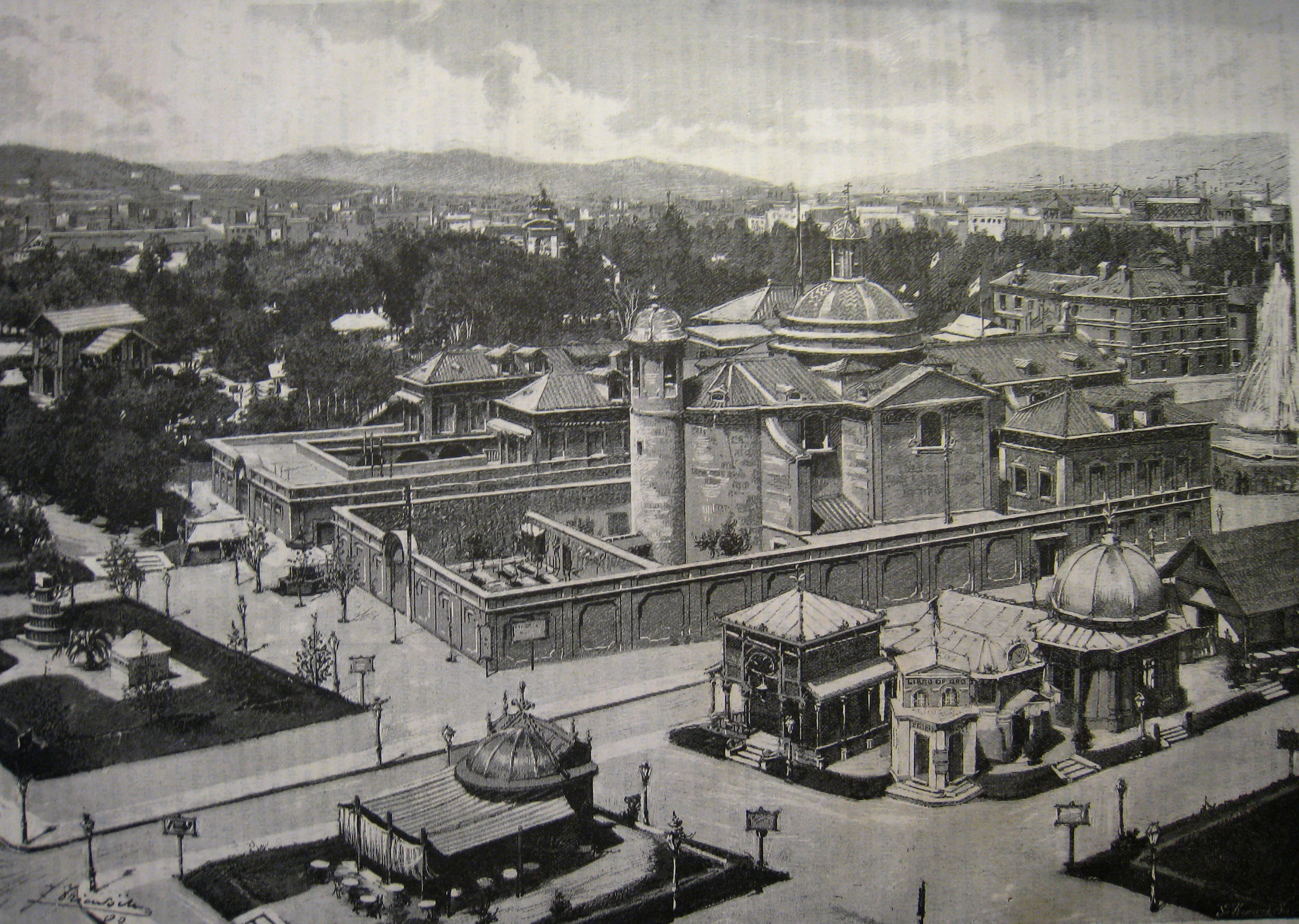
Pavilions in the Parc de la Ciutadella

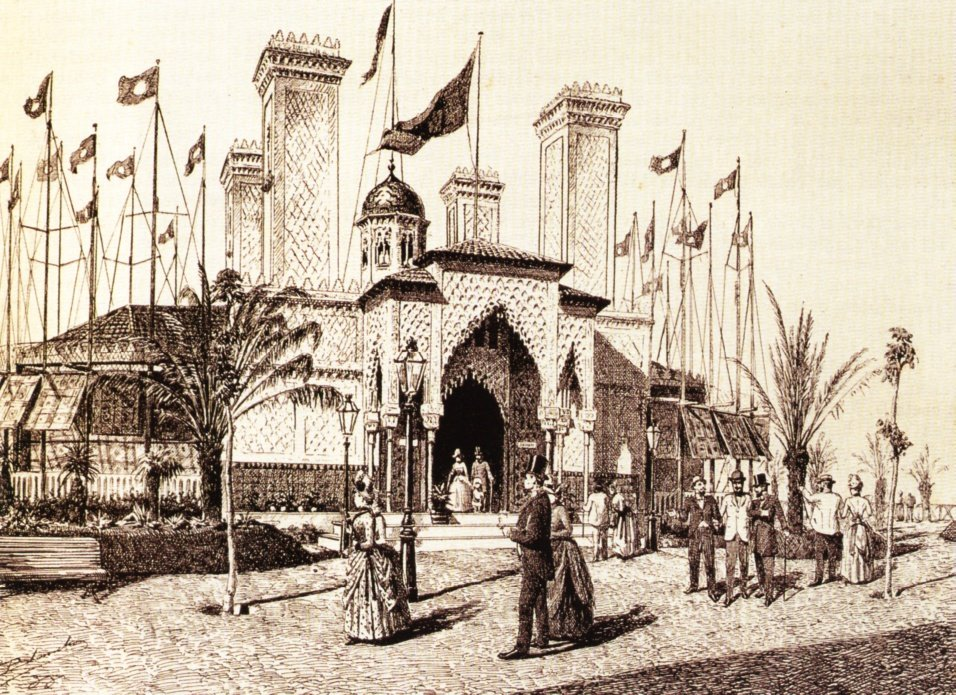
CTE pavilion at the expo, designed by Antoni Gaudí.

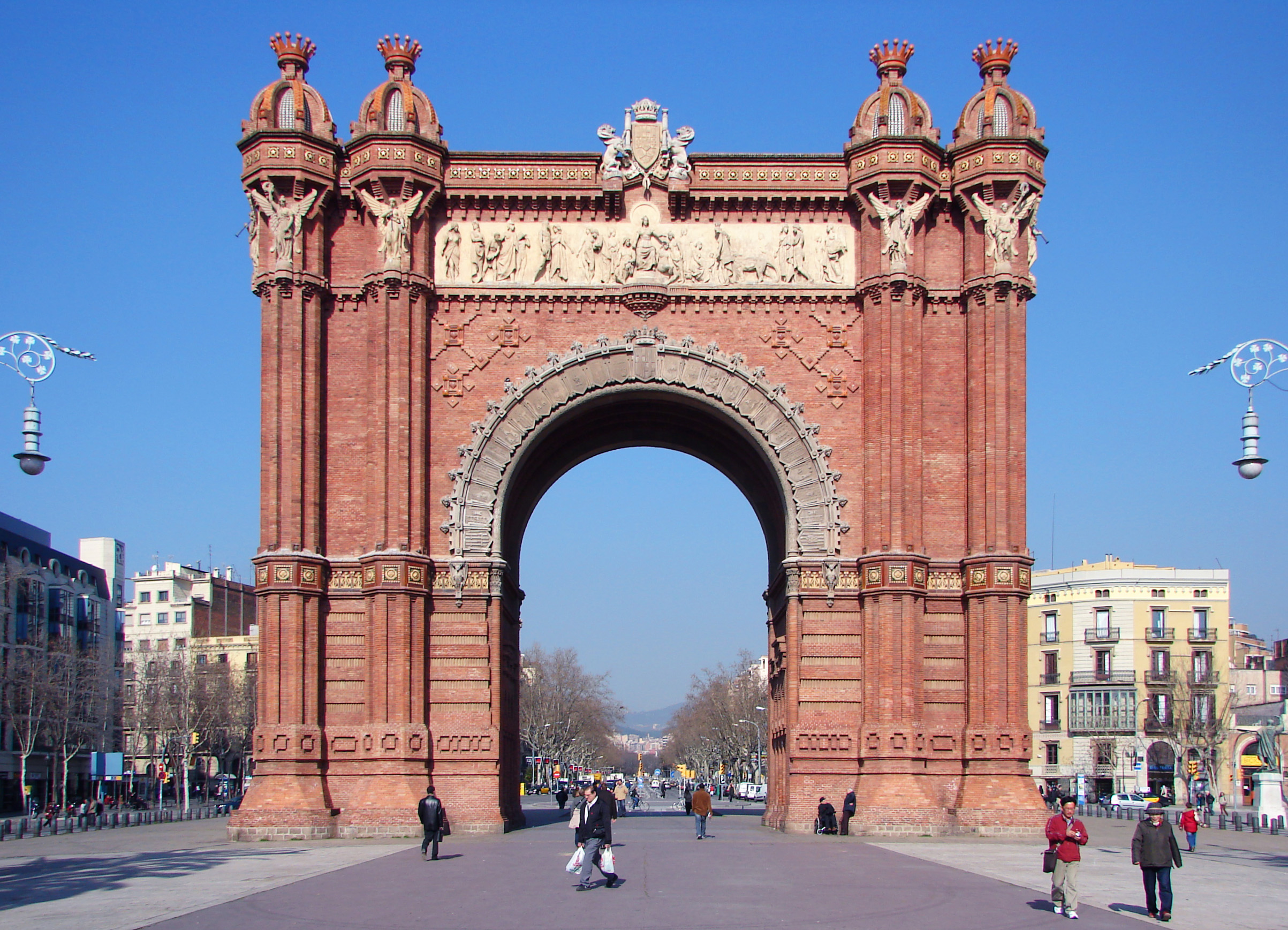
The Arc de Triomf in Barcelona

Eugenio Serrano de Casanova (journalist, writer and entrepreneur) tried to launch an exposition in 1886, and when that failed, the Mayor of Barcelona, Francesc Rius i Taulet, took over the planning of the project. The fair was hosted on the reconstructed 115-acre (47 ha) site of the city's main public park, the Parc de la Ciutadella, with Vilaseca's Arc de Triomf forming the entrance. More than 2 million people from Spain, the rest of Europe, and other international points of embarkation visited the exhibition, which made the equivalent of US$1,737,000. The fair was opened by Alfonso XIII of Spain and Maria Christina of Austria. Twenty-seven countries participated, including China, Japan and the United States.

== Contents ==
The piano manufacturer Erard sponsored a series of 20 concerts featuring Isaac Albéniz, a Catalan pianist and composer best known for his piano works based on folk music idioms. The artistic director was Tomàs Moragas.

Luisa Lacal de Bracho won a gold medal and Josep Maria Tamburini won a silver medal at the exhibition.

== Legacy and surviving monuments ==
The main legacy of the 1888 World Fair is the Ciutadella Park: the World Fair served as the opportunity for Barcelona to rid itself of the hated citadel and transform it into a central park for the city's denizens. The entire Ciutadella Park in its present layout is a product of the World Fair, with its monumental fountain and small ponds, its Castell dels tres dracs (Castle of the Three Dragons) built by Domènech i Montaner to house the World Fair's café / restaurant, which later served to house the Zoology Museum, Hivernacle (Glasshouse or Greenhouse), the classicist Geology Museum and the Umbracle (a remarkable shaded structure for plants).

Another product of the World Fair is the Modernista or Neo-Mudéjar Arc de Triomf (triumphal arch), the Fair's former gateway, presiding over Passeig de Lluís Companys.

The Columbus Monument (Monument a Colom), a 60 m (197 ft) tall monument to Christopher Columbus, was built for the exposition on the site where Columbus returned to Europe after his first voyage to the Americas. It was erected at the lower end of Les Rambles and remains standing today.

== See also ==
- 1929 Barcelona International Exposition
- 1992 Summer Olympics
- 2004 Universal Forum of Cultures
- L'Esquella de la Torratxa
- Urban planning of Barcelona
