= Claudi Lorenzale =

Spanish painter (1814–1889)

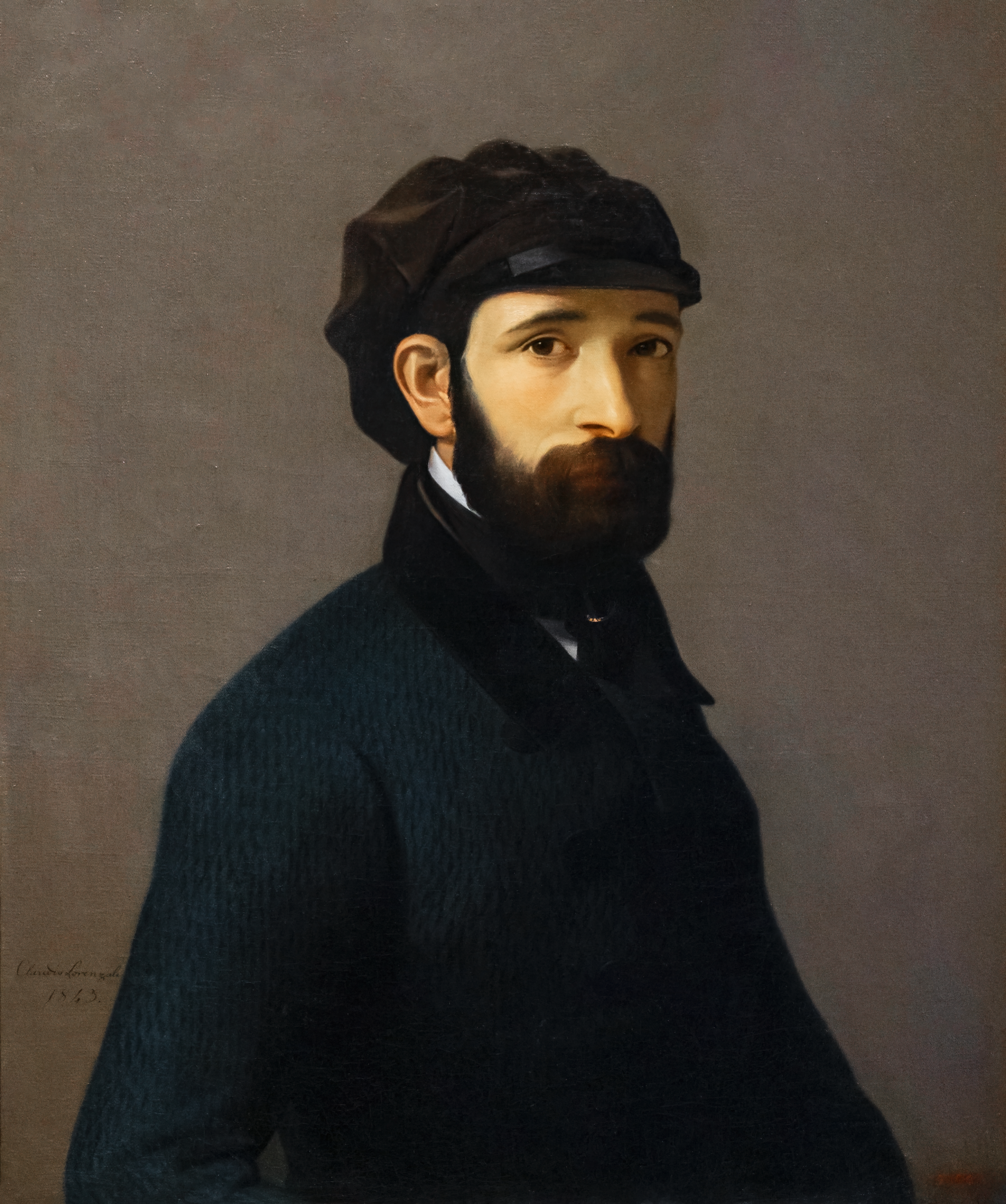
Claudi Lorenzale. self-portrait Museu Nacional d'Art de Catalunya

Claudi Lorenzale i Sugrañes (Spanish pronunciation: [ˈklawði loɾenˈθalej suˈɣɾaɲes]; 8 December 1814 – 31 March 1889) was a Spanish painter, associated with the German Nazarene movement and local efforts to recover the history of the Catalan region.

== Biography ==
He was born in Barcelona. His father was a hatter of Italian origin. He began to study painting in Murcia at the age of twelve and, after 1830, was enrolled at the Escola de la Llotja in Barcelona, where he studied under Pelegrí Clavé and was awarded the first prize in painting for his work "Sísara derrotat per Barac" (The Defeat of Sisera by Barak), in 1837. That same year, he travelled to Rome, accompanied by fellow painter Pau Milà (a follower of the Nazarene artist Friedrich Overbeck), and came under Overbeck's influence. He continued his education there at the Accademia di San Luca, where he also received the first prize for painting.

Upon his return to Barcelona in 1844, he began a career devoted to artistic purity, inspired by Medieval art and the teachings of Overbeck. In pursuit of that goal, he founded his own Academy, which became widely known. His prestige as a teacher reached its peak in 1851 when he was named an associate professor of the graduate school at the Escola. The following year, he became a full Professor and, in 1858, he became the Director, a post he filled until 1885. He retired from the academy three years later, and died in Barcelona, aged 74. Among his best-known students were Marià Fortuny, Antoni Caba and Tomàs Padró.

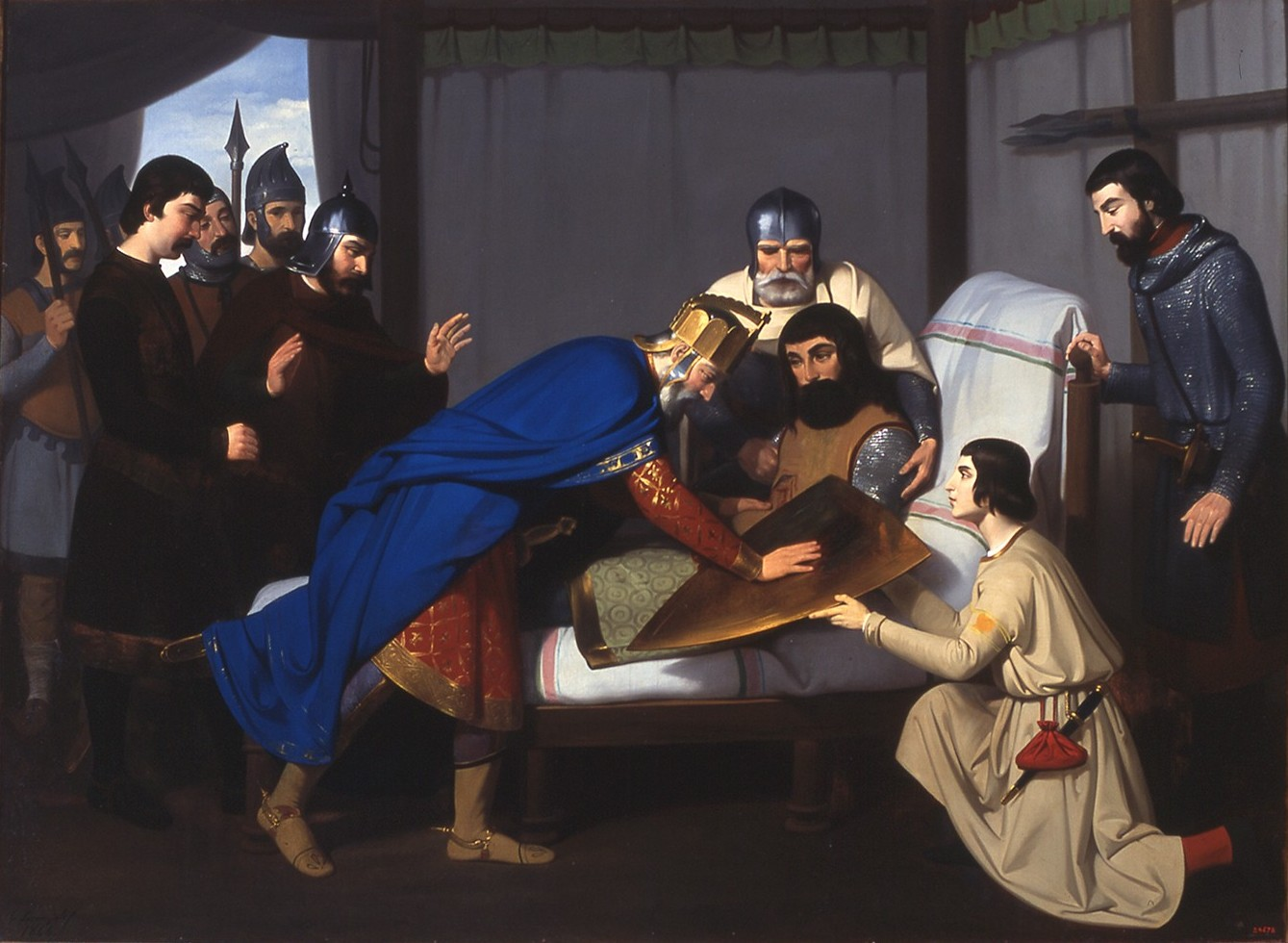
Origin of the Escutcheon of the County of Barcelona (1844)

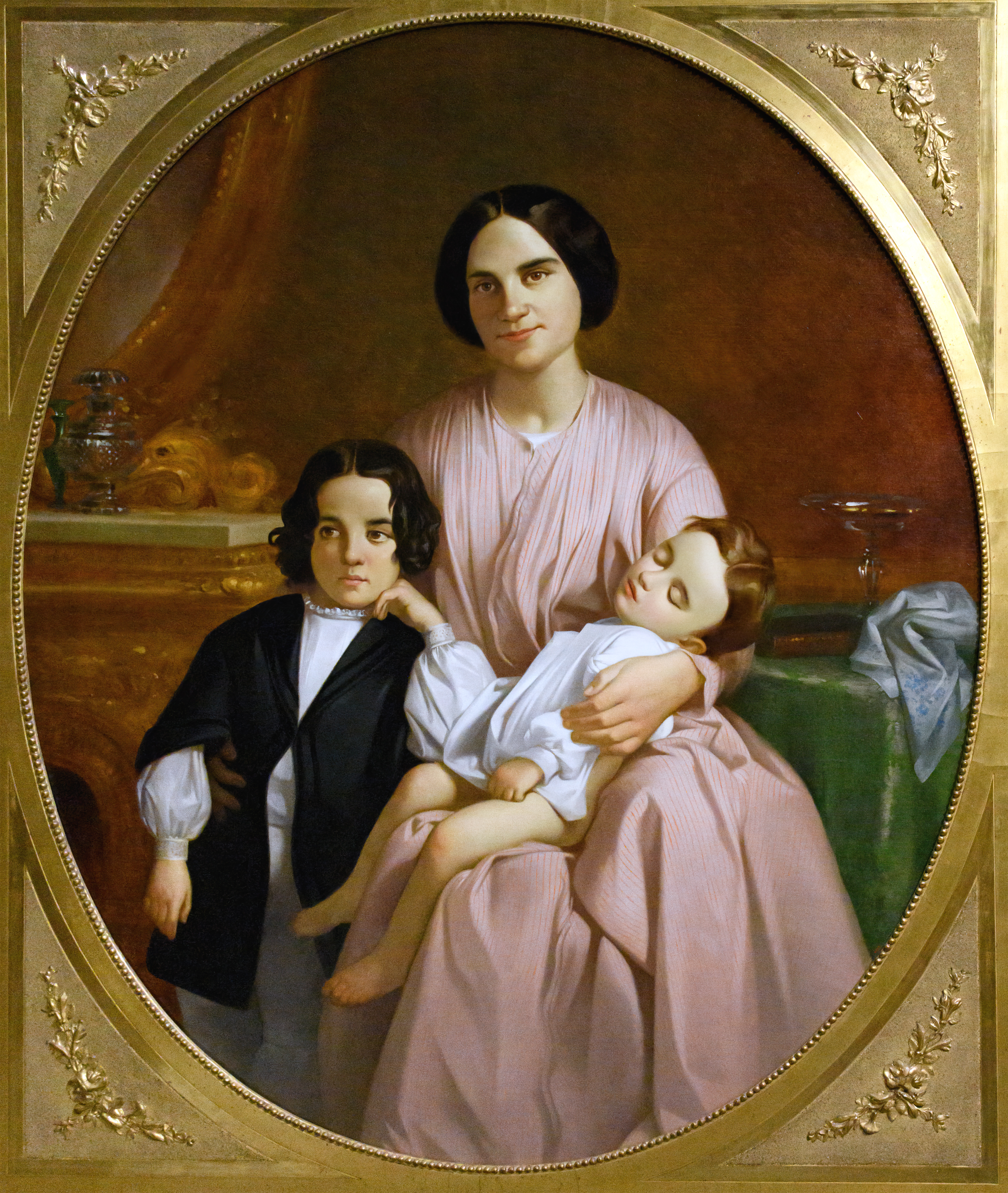
Portrait of the painter's wife and children - Museu Nacional d'Art de Catalunya
