= Pau Milà i Fontanals =

Spanish artist, writer and professor

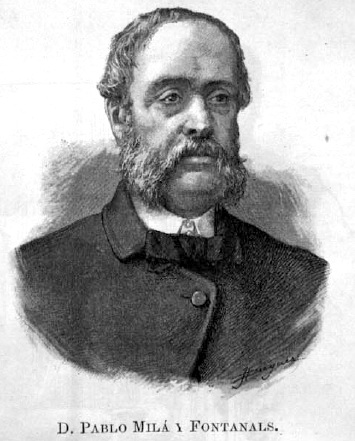
- Pau Milà i Fontanals; by Agapit Vallmitjana (1867)
- Born: Pau Milà i Fontanals; 26 December 1810; Vilafranca del Penedès, Catalonia, Spain
- Died: 16 January 1883 (aged 72); Barcelona, Catalonia, Spain
- Known for: Painting
- Movement: Romanticism

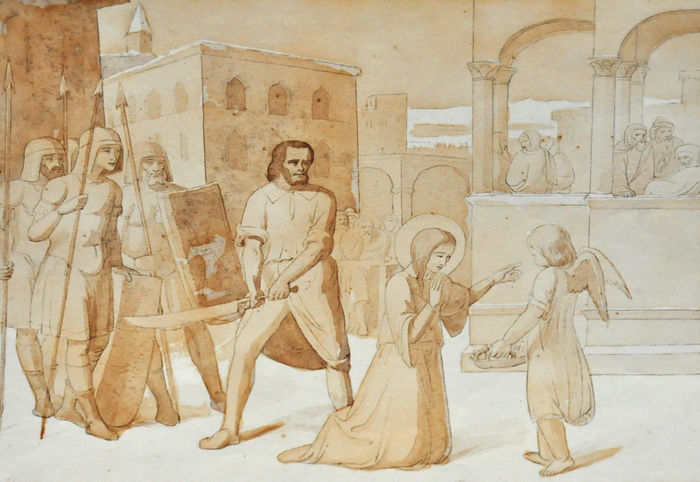
"Martyr" (1860s)

Pau Milà i Fontanals (26 December 1810, Vilafranca del Penedès - 16 January 1883, Barcelona) was a Spanish painter, writer and professor; specializing in art history and aesthetics.

== Biography ==
He was born to a prosperous family. They promoted the cultural life of their hometown, including amateur theatrical performances, and his first drawing lessons came from the scenographer, Bonaventura Planella. In the latter half of 1826, they moved to Barcelona.

There, he completed his primary education and enrolled at the Escola de la Llotja, in 1833. His short stay there was largely intended as a way of getting a stipend that would allow him to study in Rome. There, he joined with other artists from Catalonia, including Claudi Lorenzale, Pelegrí Clavé and Manuel Vilar. Their devotion to "purity" in art led to comparisons with the German group known as the Nazarenes. He stayed there until 1841; making visits to Venice, Florence, Orvieto and Siena. The drawings he made are preserved at the Reial Acadèmia Catalana de Belles Arts de Sant Jordi.

In 1851, he obtained the title of Professor at the Escola, attached to the architecture department, and he began a campaign to preserve Barcelona's architectural heritage. He held that position for five years, then resigned. In 1861, he was appointed President of the Ateneu Català, a cultural association now known as the Ateneu Barcelonès.

His first major project was in conjunction with the Comissió Provincial de Monuments: having the Chapel of Santa Àgata declared a "Bien de Interés Cultural", analyzing its structure (together with Elies Rogent), and beginning restoration. In 1868, the Escola named him an "Honorary Scholar", allowing him to continue his preservation work with the school's support. He was named president of the Comissió in 1877.
