= List of people on the postage stamps of Mexico =

This is a list of people on postage stamps of Mexico, including the years in which they appeared on a stamp.

The list is complete through 2014.

== 0–9 ==
- 10 Venado Pechera de Tigre, Mixtec princess (1982)

== A ==
- Mariano Abasolo, hero of Independence (1910)
- Acamapichtli, Aztec ruler (1982)
- Manuel Acuña, poet (2013)
- Hermanas Águila, María Esperanza Águila (†1991) and María Paz Águila (†2004), singers (1995)
- Enrique Aguilar González (1904–1957), educator (2004)
- Cándido Aguilar Vargas, general (1997)
- Gonzalo Aguirre Beltrán, anthropologist (2008)
- Lauro Aguirre Espinosa (1882–1928), educator (1994)
- Lucas Alamán, statesman and historian (1998)
- Juan Aldama, hero of Independence (1910, 1975, 1986)
- Miguel Alemán Valdés, president (1950, 2008)
- David Alfaro Siqueiros, painter (1975, 1996)
- Jorge Alessandri, president of Chile (1962)
- Vito Alessio Robles, historian (1988)
- Ignacio Allende, hero of Independence (1910, 1943, 1969, 1985, 1994, 2008)
- Ignacio Altamirano, writer (1984, 1986, 1995)
- Luis Álvarez Barret (1901–1971), educator (2000)
- Joaquín Amaro Domínguez, general (1997)
- Pedro María Anaya, president (1947, 1995)
- Soledad Anaya Solórzano (1895–1978), educator (1998)
- Felipe Ángeles, general (1997, 2014)
- Fanny Anitúa, mezzo-soprano (1983)
- Aristotle, Greek philosopher (1978)
- Pedro Armendáriz, film star (1993)
- Ponciano Arriaga, statesman (1956)
- Carlos Arruza, matador (1996)
- Dr. Atl, painter (1975) (painting Paricutín pictured 1971)
- Mariano Azuela, novelist (1974)
- José Azueta, naval lieutenant, hero (1964, 2014)

== B ==
- Johann Sebastian Bach, German composer (1985)
- Lucas Balderas general (1947)
- José María Barceló de Villagrán (1819–1872), surgeon (1996)
- Luis Barragán, architect (interior staircase shown 2002)
- Gabino Barreda, philosopher (1968, 1981)
- Juan de la Barrera, cadet (1947)
- Baudouin I, Belgian king (1965)
- Gustavo Baz Prada, educator (1993)
- Ludwig van Beethoven, German composer (1977) (handwritten score and signature pictured 1970)
- Lola Beltrán, singer and actress (1995)
- Jorge Mario Bergoglio, Argentine pope (2016)
- Felipe Berriozábal, general (1995)
- Rómulo Betancourt president of Venezuela (1965)
- Lucien Bianchi, Belgian race car driver (2018)
- Andrés Eloy Blanco, poet (1997)
- Adamo Boari, architect (2000)
- Simón Bolívar, South American liberator (1980, 1983)
- Ramón Guillermo Bonfil Viveros, educator and politician (2018)
- Juan Bosch, president of Dominican Republic (2009)
- Gilberto Bosques, diplomat (2015)
- Carlos Bracho (1899–1966), sculptor (1983)
- Alberto Braniff, aviation pioneer (2010)
- Nicolás Bravo, president (1986, 2010)
- Luis Buñuel, Spanish filmmaker (2000)

== C ==
- Luis Cabrera Lobato, politician and writer (1910)
- Plutarco Elías Calles, president (1995, 2000)
- Cantinflas, film star (1993, 2011)
- Enrique Carbajal "Sebastián", sculptor (sculpture shown 1996)
- Lázaro Cárdenas, president (1971, 1978, 1995, 2020)
- Emilio Carranza, aviator (1929, 1947, 1978)
- Jesús Carranza, general (1917)
- Venustiano Carranza, president (1916, 1938, 1960, 1967, 1985, 1995, 1997, 2009, 2010, 2013, 2020)
- Felipe Carrillo Puerto, governor (1974)
- Julián Carrillo, composer (1975)
- Pablo Casals, Spanish cellist (score of El pesebre shown 1976)
- Alfonso Caso, archaeologist (1996)
- Antonio Caso, philosopher (1983, 1988)
- Estefanía Castañeda Núñez, educator (1994, 2019)
- Isidro Castillo Pérez (1900–1988), educator (2006)
- Juan Ignacio María de Castorena Ursúa y Goyeneche, bishop and founder of the first Mexican periodical (1944)
- Guadalupe Ceniceros de Perez (1909–1968), educator (1999)
- Miguel de Cervantes, Spanish author (1975, Don Quijote shown 2005)
- Chabelo, television actor and host (2006)
- Carlos Chávez, composer (1983, 1999)
- Ignacio Chávez Sánchez, physician (1993, 1997)
- Chespirito, television director, writer and actor (2006)
- Francisco Javier Clavijero, priest and historian (1971, 1981)
- Genaro Codina (1852–1901), composer (1946)
- Rey Colimán (15th & 16th centuries), chief of the Colimas (1979)
- Christopher Columbus, navigator (1992)
- Jesús F. Contreras, sculptor (2016)
- Copernicus, Polish astronomer (1973)
- Dolores Correa Zapata, teacher, poet, feminist (2015)
- Daniel Cosío Villegas, economist and historian (2001)
- Cri-Cri (Francisco Gabilondo Soler), singer (1995)
- Cuauhtémoc, Aztec ruler (1915, 1950, 1975, 1980, 1995)
- Gonzalo Curiel, composer (1995)

== D ==
- Dante, Italian poet (1965)
- Rubén Darío, Nicaraguan poet (1966)
- Charles de Gaulle, French president (1964, 2014)
- Mario de la Cueva, educator and jurist (2001)
- Juan Antonio de la Fuente, politician and diplomat (2017)
- Santos Degollado, general (1995)
- Andrés Manuel del Río, scientist (1965)
- Dolores del Río, film star (1993)
- Demosthenes, Athenian orator (1974)
- Francisco Díaz Covarrubias, geographer (1973)
- Salvador Díaz Mirón, poet (1983)
- Ponciano Díaz Salinas (1856–1899), bullfighter (1999)
- Belisario Domínguez, martyr (1917, 1963)
- Miguel Domínguez, statesman (2005)
- Giovani dos Santos, football player (2010)
- Alfredo Dugès, botanist (1975)
- Albrecht Dürer, German painter (woodcut pictured 1971)

== E ==
- Thomas Alva Edison, US inventor (1981)
- Eight Deer Tiger Claw, Mixtec warrior (1980)
- Albert Einstein, Swiss physicist (1979, 2005)
- Willem Einthoven, Dutch physiologist (1972)
- Dieter Enkelin (1926-1995), entomologist (2011)
- Martín Enríquez de Almanza, viceroy (1946, 1956, 1979)
- Luis Enrique Erro, astronomer (1973, 1986)
- Mariano Escobedo, general (1997)
- Juan Escutia, cadet (1947)
- Fermín Espinosa "Armillita", bullfighter (1996, 2011))
- Enrique Estrada, general (1946)
- Genaro Estrada, diplomat and writer (1983)

== F ==
- Fabiola, Belgian queen (1965)
- Felipe II, Spanish king (1979)
- María Félix, movie star (1993)
- José Joaquín Fernández de Lizardi, novelist (1972)
- Joaquín Manuel Fernández de Santa Cruz, child subject of a painting by Nicolás Rodríguez Juárez (1996)
- Alexander Fleming, British scientist (1981)
- Ricardo Flores Magón, anarchist and labor organizer (2008)
- Adela Formoso de Obregón Santacilia (1905–1981), educator and feminist (2001)
- Pope Francis, Argentine pope (2016)
- Sigmund Freud, Austrian psychiatrist (1997)

== G ==
- Francisco Gabilondo Soler, singer (1995, 2007)
- Benita Galeana, feminist and suffragist (2020)
- Galileo, Italian astronomer (1971)
- Rómulo Gallegos, Venezuelan novelist (1984)
- Joaquín Gallo (1882–1965) astronomer (1973)
- Joaquín Gamboa Pascoe, labor leader and politician (2016)
- Manuel Gamio, anthropologist (1982)
- Gandhi, leader of India's Independence movement (1969)
- Pedro de Gante, missionary (1972)
- Rodolfo Gaona, bullfighter (1996)
- Alfonso García Robles, diplomat (1982)
- Jesús García Corona, railroad engineer, hero (2007)
- Federico García Lorca, Spanish poet (1998)
- Francisco García Salinas, statesman (1946)
- Francisco Garcia y Santos, Uruguayan postmaster general (1926)
- Ángel María Garibay K., philologist (1982)
- Gonzalo Garita y Frontera (1897–1921), engineer (2000)
- Lorenzo Garza Arrambide, (1909–1978), bullfighter (1996)
- Manuel Gea González (1892–1950), physician (1997)
- Ernest Charles Gimpel, subject of a painting by Ángel Zárraga (1986)
- Francisco Goitia, painter (1983)
- Federico Gómez Santos pediatrician (1993)
- Roberto Gómez Bolaños, television director, writer and actor (2006)
- Valentín Gómez Farías, president (1956, 1975, 1981, 1983)
- Manuel Gómez Morín, politician (1997)
- María Luisa Gonzaga Foncerrada y Labarrieta, subject of a painting by José María Vázquez (1765–1826) (1996)
- Epigmenio González, hero of Independence (1910)
- Francisco González Bocanegra, poet (2004)
- Guillermo González Camarena, inventor (1982)
- Luz González Cosío de López, founder of the Mexican Red Cross (2010)
- Roque González Garza, provisional president (2010)
- Enrique González Martínez, poet (1972)
- Jesús González Ortega, general and statesman (1946, 1981)
- Celestino Gorostiza, playwright (2004)
- João Goulart, Brazilian president (1962)
- Juan de la Granja, introduced telegraph to Mexico (2000)
- Andrés Guardado, football player (2010)
- Juan Vicente de Güemes, 2nd Count of Revillagigedo, viceroy (1960)
- Vicente Guerrero, hero of independence, president (1921, 1971, 1981, 1982, 1985, 2010)
- Ángela Gurría, sculptor (sculpture pictured 1976)
- Eulalio Gutiérrez Ortiz, general and provisional president (2010, 2014)
- Eulalia Guzmán, archeologist and teacher (2005)
- León Guzmán, statesman (1956, 1975)
- Martín Luis Guzmán, novelist (1985)
- Rodolfo Guzmán Huerta, wrestler (2008)
- Jorge Guzmán Rodríguez, wrestler (2008)

== H ==
- Guillermo Haro Barraza, astronomer (2013)
- Andrés Henestrosa, writer (1996, 2006)
- Francisco Hernández, naturalist (title page of book shown 1975)
- Javier Hernández, football player (2014)
- Juan E. Hernández y Dávalos, historian and collector of documents relating to Mexican Independence (1987)
- Saturnino Herrán, painter (1987)
- Alfonso L Herrera, biologist (1975, 2011)
- Maclovio Herrera, general (1917)
- Heinrich Rudolph Hertz, German physicist (1967)

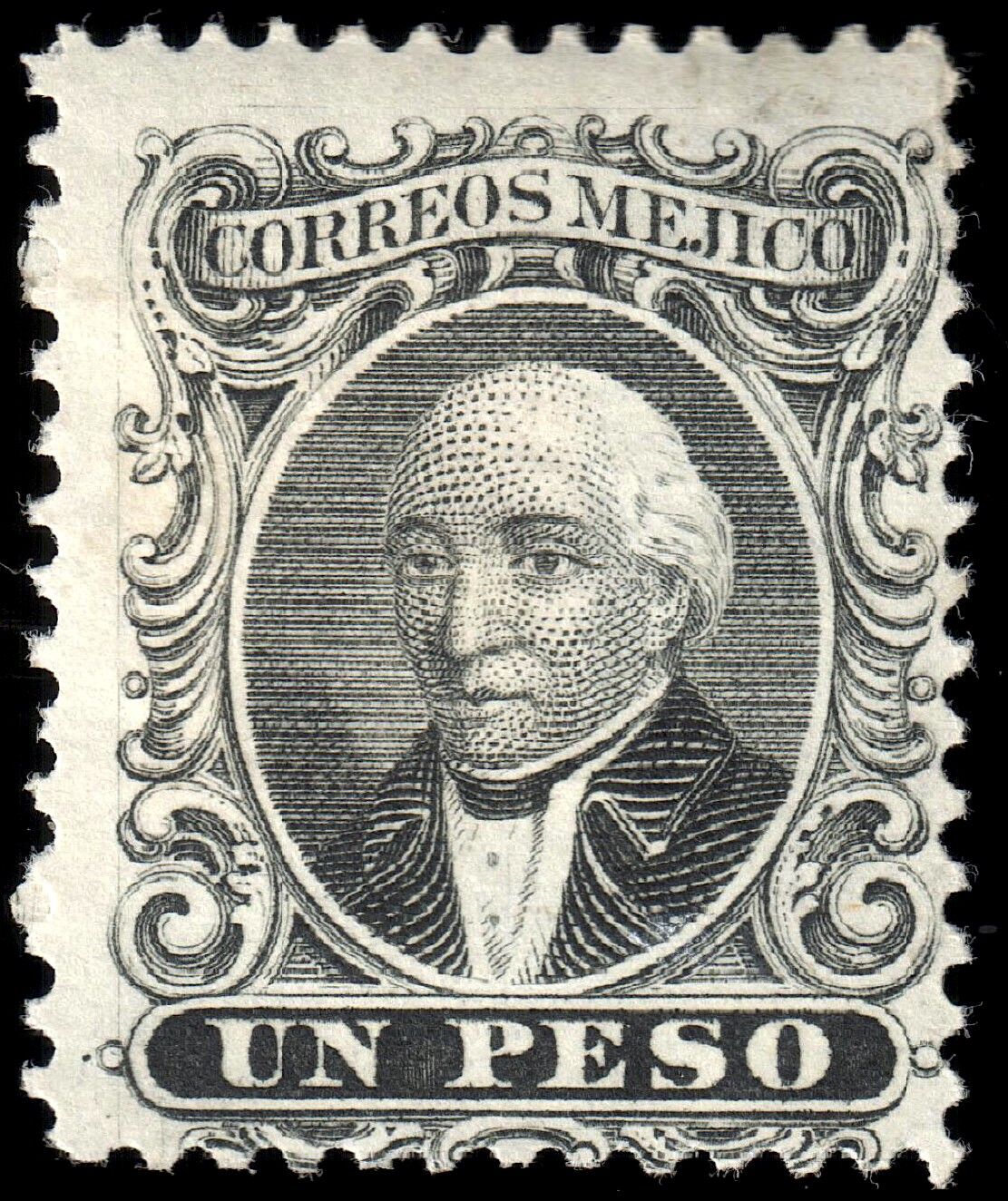
Miguel Hidalgo (1868 issue)

- Miguel Hidalgo y Costilla, hero of Independence (1856, 1861, 1864, 1868, 1872, 1874, 1910, 1940, 1947, 1952, 1953, 1956, 1960, 1963, 1976, 1985, 1986, 2003, 2006, 2008, 2010, 2016)
- El Hijo del Santo, wrestler (2008)
- Fernando Hiriart Balderrama, engineer (2014)
- Rowland Hill, British inventor (1979)
- Victor Hugo, French novelist (1985)
- Alexander von Humboldt, German explorer and naturalist (1960, 1999)

== I ==
- José María Iglesias, president (1987)
- Pedro Infante, movie star (1996)
- Agustín de Iturbide, general, emperor (1921)

== J ==
- José Alfredo Jiménez, singer-songwriter(1998)
- Mariano Jiménez, hero of Independence (1986)
- Miguel Jiménez (19th century), gastroenterologist (1975)
- Juana Inés de la Cruz, poet (1971, 1995, 2015, 2020)
- Juan Carlos I, Spanish king (1977)
- John Paul II, pope, (1990, 1999, 2004)
- Benito Juárez, president (1879, 1882, 1915, 1926, 1950, 1972, 1998, 1999, 2006, 2017)
- Margarita Maza de Juárez, first lady (1972)
- Juliana, Dutch queen (1964)
- Justinian I, Byzantine emperor (1972)

== K ==
- Frida Kahlo, painter (2001, 2006)
- John F. Kennedy, US president (1962, 1964)
- Johannes Kepler, German astronomer (1971)
- Martin Luther King, US civil rights leader (1968)
- Eusebio Francisco Kino, explorer (1987)
- Roberto Kobeh González, leader in civil aviation (2016)
- Robert Koch, German doctor (1982)

== L ==
- Francisco Lagos Cházaro, provisional president (2010)
- Bartolomé de las Casas, cleric (1933, 1966)
- Agustín Lara, composer (1995) (keyboard and signature pictured 1970)
- Jean-Baptiste de La Salle, French saint and educator (2005)
- Miguel Layún, football player (2014)
- Antonio de León, general (1947)
- Miguel Lerdo de Tejada, composer (1974)
- Sebastián Lerdo de Tejada, president (1974)
- Franz Liszt, Hungarian composer (1986)
- Xavier López, television actor and host (2006)
- Miguel López de Legazpi, conquistador (1964)
- Adolfo López Mateos. president (1964, 1994, 2010)
- José López Portillo, president (1977)
- Ignacio López Rayón, hero of Independence (1910, 1982, 2010)
- Ramón López Rayón, general (2010)
- Ramón López Velarde, poet (1946, 1972, 1988)
- Federico García Lorca, Spanish poet (1998)
- Rafael Lucio Nájera, doctor (1978)

== M ==
- Francisco I. Madero, president (1915, 1917, 1935, 1939, 1950, 1973 1985, 2008, 2009)
- Nelson Mandela, South African revolutionary and president (2013)
- Antonio Margil de Jesús, missionary (1946)
- Sor María Engracia Josefa del Santísimo Rosario (19th century), nun (2012)
- Francisco Márquez, cadet (1947)
- Rafael Márquez, football player (2014)
- José Martí, Cuban writer and national hero (1995)
- Manolo Martínez, bullfighter (1996)
- Mariano Matamoros, hero of Independence (1971)
- Maximilian I of Mexico, emperor (1866)
- James Clerk Maxwell, British physicist (1967)
- Margarita Maza de Juárez, first lady (1972)
- Agustín Melgar, cadet (1947)
- Laura Méndez de Cuenca, poet, educator and feminist (2014)
- Gregorio Méndez, soldier and politician (1964)
- Antonio de Mendoza, viceroy (1939)
- Carlos Mérida, Guatemalan painter (1991)
- Manuel de Mier y Terán, general (2010)
- Mil Máscaras, wrestler (2011)
- Francisco Javier Mina, hero of Independence (1989, 2010)
- Moctezuma I, Aztec ruler (1987)
- Mario José Molina Henríquez, chemist (1997)
- Fernando Montes de Oca, cadet (1947)
- José María Luis Mora, political thinker (1975, 1994)
- Rodolfo Morales, painter (painting shown 2001)
- José María Morelos, priest and hero of Independence (1915, 1934, 1956, 1963, 1965, 1985, 2005, 2008, 2015)
- Mario Moreno "Cantinflas", film star (1993, 2011)
- Pedro Moreno, hero of Independence (1967, 2010)
- Samuel Morse, US inventor and painter (2000)
- Wolfgang Amadeus Mozart, Austrian composer (1991, 2006)
- Francisco J. Múgica, soldier, revolutionary and politician (1984)
- Gerardo Murillo, painter (1975) (painting Paricutín pictured 1971)

== N ==
- Antonio Narro (†1912), philanthropist (1973)
- Jorge Negrete, film star (1993)
- Rodolfo Neri Vela, astronaut (1985, 2010)
- Amado Nervo, poet (1971)
- Nezahualcóyotl, ruler of Texcoco (1972, 1980, 2002)
- Nezahualpilli, ruler of Texcoco (1987)
- Luis Nishizawa, painter (family mon shown 1998)
- Isaac Newton, British physicist (1971)
- Ramón Novarro, actor (1986) (the name is misspelled Novaro on the stamp)
- Salvador Novo, poet (1975, 2004)
- Jaime Nunó, composer (2004)

== O ==
- Álvaro Obregón, president (1978)
- Melchor Ocampo, statesman (1940, 1956, 1975)
- Guillermo Ochoa, football player (2010)
- Ocho Venado Garra de Tigre, Mixtec warrior (1980)
- Isaac Ochoterena, biologist (1982)
- Edmundo O'Gorman, historian (2006)
- Juan O'Gorman, painter and architect (2005)
- Miguel Ojeda, baseball player (2010)
- Martín de Olivares (1574–1604), postmaster (1979)
- José Clemente Orozco, painter (1983) (painting pictured 1971)
- Mariano Otero, statesman (2007, 2017)
- Josefa Ortiz de Domínguez, heroine of Independence (1910, 1979, 2008)
- Luis Ortiz Monasterio, sculptor (his sculpture El Dios de Hoy pictured 1979)
- Gilberto Owen, poet (2004)

== P ==
- Pakal, ruler of Palenque (2002)
- Louis Pasteur, French scientist (1995)
- Octavio Paz, poet and writer (2014)
- Víctor Paz Estenssoro, Bolivian president (1963)
- Carlos Pellicer, poet (1988, 1997)
- José Peón y Contreras, poet (1993)
- Carlos Alberto Peña, football player (2014)
- Ángela Peralta, soprano (1974, 1983)
- Oribe Peralta, football player (2014)
- Silverio Pérez, bullfighter (1996)
- Felipe Pescador, (1880-1929) railwayman (1989)
- Philip II, Spanish king (1979)
- Pablo Picasso, Spanish painter (1981) (painting shown 1974)
- José María Pino Suárez, vice-president (1917, 1986, 2008)
- Marco Polo, Italian explorer (1967)
- Manuel Ponce, composer (1974)
- José Guadalupe Posada, illustrator (engraving Don Quijote pictured 1963) (1988) (engraving La despedida shown 2002) (showing drawings 2013)
- Guillermo Prieto, poet and statesman (1956, 1963, 1997)
- Francisco Primo de Verdad y Ramos, martyr of independence (2008)

== Q ==
- Vasco de Quiroga, cleric (1940, 1971)

== R ==
- Emilio Rabasa, politician and writer (2012)
- Ignacio Ramírez, writer and statesman (1956, 1975)
- Rafael Ramírez Castañeda, educator (1994, 1997)
- Miguel Ramos Arizpe, priest and statesman (Constitution of 1824 shown 1993)
- Ramón Rayón, general (2010)
- Manuel Crescencio Rejón, jurist (1988)
- Silvestre Revueltas, composer (1974, 1999) (violin and bow pictured 1990)
- Alfonso Reyes, essayist and philosopher (1985, 1989)
- Manuel Rincón (1784–1849), commander of Mexican forces at the Battle of Churubusco. (1947)
- Gilberto Rincón Gallardo, politician (2018)
- José Rizal, Filipino national hero (1964)
- Diego Rivera, painter (1986)
- Rodolfo Robles, Guatemalan doctor (1974)
- Sóstenes Rocha, general (1995)
- Aaron Rodríguez, wrestler (2011)
- Pedro Rodríguez, race car driver (2018)
- Leonardo Rodríguez Alcaine, labor leader (2016)
- Wilhelm Roentgen, German physicist (1995)
- José Rubén Romero, novelist (1985)
- Eleanor Roosevelt, US first lady (1964)
- Franklin Delano Roosevelt, US president (1947)
- Juventino Rosas, composer (sheet music cover pictured 1972)
- Arturo Rosenblueth, physiologist (1975)
- Antonio M. Ruiz, painter (1988)
- Maximiliano Ruiz Castañeda, physician (1994)
- Adolfo Ruiz Cortines, president (1989)
- Juan Ruiz de Alarcón, playwright (1972)
- Horacio Ruiz Gaviño, (1893-1957) aviator (1967)
- Juan Rulfo, writer (1996, 2005)

== S ==
- Jaime Sabines, poet (2009)
- Moisés Sáenz Garza, educator (1994)
- Antoine de Saint-Exupéry, French author and aviator (1994)
- Pedro Sainz de Baranda, naval captain (1987, 2005)
- Mario Salazar Mallén, physician (1993)
- José de San Martín, South American liberator (1973)
- José Luis Sandoval, baseball player (2010)
- Manuel Sandoval Vallarta, nuclear physicist (1982)
- El Santo (Rodolfo Guzmán Huerta), wrestler (2008)
- José Santos Valdés, educator (2020)
- Francisco Sarabia Tinoco (1900–1939), aviator (2000)
- Domingo Faustino Sarmiento, Argentine intellectual and president (1975)
- Roberto Saucedo, baseball player (2010)
- Franz Schubert, Austrian composer (1978)
- Sebastián, sculptor (sculpture shown 1996)
- Bernardo Sepúlveda Gutiérrez, physician (1993)
- Aquiles Serdán, martyr (1917, 1977, 2008)
- Junípero Serra, missionary (1969)
- Justo Sierra, writer (1947, 1985, 1998, 1999, 2002, 2012)
- Carlos de Sigüenza y Góngora, astronomer (1973)
- David Alfaro Siqueiros, painter (1975, 1996)
- Fernando Soler, film actor and director (1994)
- Heinrich von Stephan, German postmaster general (1974, 1997)
- Antonio Stradivarius, Italian violin maker (1987)
- Vicente Suárez, cadet (1947)

== T ==
- Rufino Tamayo, painter (his painting Dualidad 1964 pictured 1987; his Self-portrait pictured 1999)
- Tariácuri, Purépecha ruler (1982)
- Constantino de Tárnava (1898-1974), radio pioneer (1996)
- Servando Teresa de Mier, hero of independence (2010)
- U Thant, UN secretary-general (1966)
- Josip Broz Tito, Yugoslav president (1963)
- Tlahuicole (also spelled Tlahuicolli), Tlaxcaltec warrior (1976)
- Manuel Tolsá, sculptor (his sculpture El caballito pictured 1976)
- Toña la Negra, singer (1995)
- Gerardo Torrado, football player (2010)
- Jaime Torres Bodet, writer and diplomat (1975, 2011, 2016, 2017)
- Gregorio Torres Quintero, educator and writer (1994, 2003)
- Lupita Tovar, actress (1981)
- Jacinto B. Treviño González, general (1997)
- Emilio Tuero, singer and film actor (1995)

== U ==
- Andrés de Urdaneta, navigator (1966)
- Virgilio Uribe, naval cadet, hero (1964, 2014)
- Francisco L. Urquizo, general and writer (1997)
- Rodolfo Usigli, playwright (2005)

== V ==
- Ignacio L. Vallarta Ogazón, statesman (2005)
- Leandro Valle, general (1987, 1995)
- Artemio del Valle Arizpe, writer and diplomat (1967, 1985)
- César Vallejo Peruvian poet (1988)
- Pedro Vargas, singer and film actor (1995)
- Ildefonso Vázquez, revolutionary general (1917)
- José Vasconcelos, statesman and philosopher (1982, 1994, 1999, 2001, 2011)
- José María Velasco, painter (1971)
- Joaquín Velázquez de León, jurist and mining reformer (1983)
- Fidel Velázquez Sánchez, union leader (2016)
- Jules Verne, French novelist (1976)
- Ricardo Vértiz (1848–1898), ophthalmologist (1976)
- Leona Vicario, spy and heroine of Independence (1910, 1915, 1985, 1989, 2020)
- Queen Victoria, portrayed on Penny Black (1940, 1990)
- Guadalupe Victoria, president (1986, 1993, 2010)
- Manuel Vilar, sculptor (sculpture of Tlahuicole pictured 1976)
- Francisco "Pancho" Villa, revolutionary leader (1978, 1985, 2009, 2010, 2014)
- Fernando Villalpando (1844-1902), musician (1946)
- Xavier Villaurrutia, poet (2002)
- Antonio Vivaldi, Italian composer (1978)

== W ==
- George Washington, US president, portrayed on first US Postage Stamp (1947)
- Frank Wilson, US cardiologist (1972)

== X ==
- Xólotl, Chichimeca invader of the Valley of Mexico (1987)

== Y ==
- Agustín Yáñez, novelist (1985, 1997, 2004)

== Z ==
- Emiliano Zapata, revolutionary leader (1935, 1965, 1979, 1985, 1994, 2009, 2010, 2019)
- Rosaura Zapata Cano, educator (1994)
- Ignacio Zaragoza, general (1915, 1917, 1995, 2012)
- Francisco Zarco, journalist and statesman (1956)
- Salvador Zubirán, physician and nutritionist (1998)
- Juan Zumárraga, cleric, early printer (1939)
- Francisco Zúñiga, sculptor (sculpture shown 1994)

== See also ==
- Postage stamps and postal history of Mexico

== Sources ==
- Scott Standard Postage Stamp Catalogue, various editions.
- Fernández Terán, Carlos (2009). Catálogo filatélico de timbres mexicanos 1856-2008: 152 años del timbre postal mexicano. Mexico City: Libros Virtuales. ISBN 978-968-5587-02-0.
- Correos de México
