= Monument to Christopher Columbus (Buenavista, Mexico City) =

Statue in Mexico City, Mexico

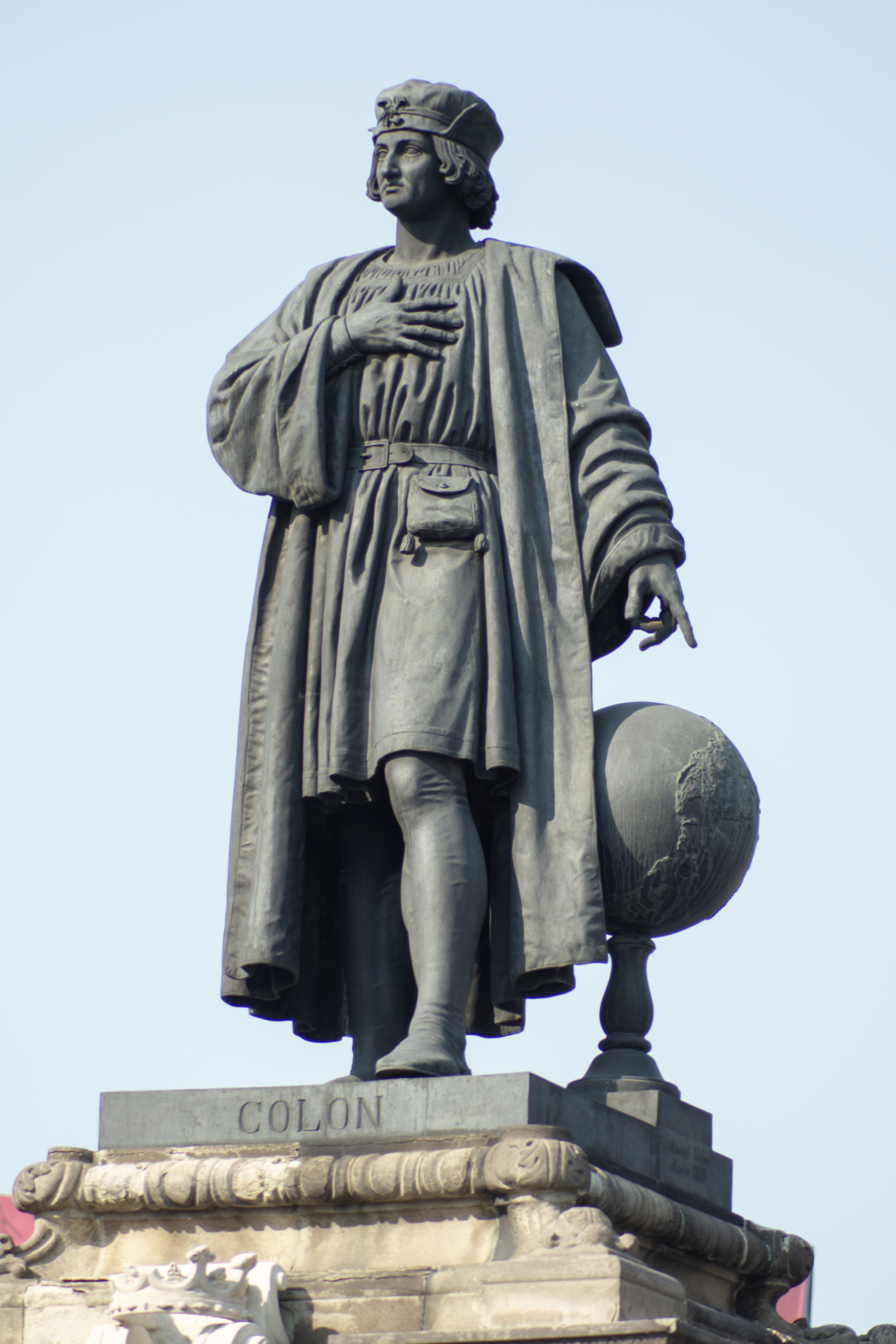
- The monument in Buenavista in 2014
- Artist: Manuel Vilar (sculpture)
- Year: 1892
- Subject: Christopher Columbus
- Location: Mexico City, Mexico; 19.4405286°N 99.1526845°W

The Monument to Christopher Columbus, located at the intersection of av. Buenavista and Héroes Ferrocarrileros, in the Cuauhtémoc section of Mexico City, was inaugurated in 1892, for the 400th anniversary of Christopher Columbus' landfall in the Caribbean. The statue is the only one depicting Columbus in Mexico City; Charles Cordier's Monument to Christopher Columbus (1877) had been installed on Paseo de la Reforma but was moved outside the city following protests in 2020.

== Description and history ==
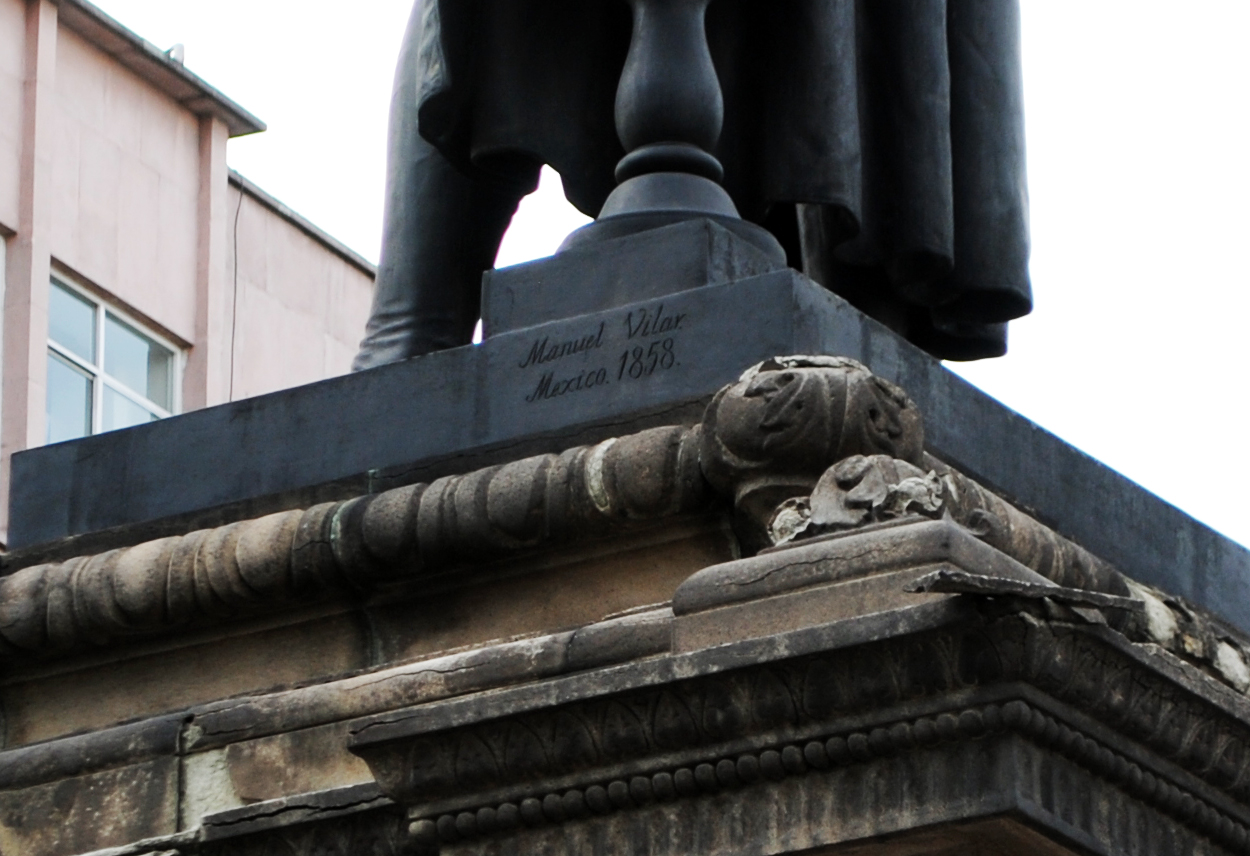
Vilar's name and date on the Buenavista statue

The monument was Mexican in conception and was realized in Mexico. A history of the two monuments by José Manuel Villalpando shows that plans for a monument to Columbus had been planned well before the Cordier commission, with Catalan sculptor Manuel Vilar, who worked for many years in Mexico City, creating an early model for the statue. The statue erected in 1892 has as part of the pedestal, at Columbus's feet, Vilar's name and the date 1858, seeking to establish the sculpture's conception predating the Cordier statue. Unlike the other Columbus statue in Mexico City, the 1892 statue has no religious iconography, a departure from the usual conventions depicting the Admiral.

The inauguration of the second Columbus statue coincided with the 400th anniversary of Columbus's first voyage and an opportunity for the regime of Porfirio Díaz to reshape the image of Columbus for the current era in Mexican history marked by economic expansion tied to foreign investment rather than Christian evangelization of the late 15th and early 16th centuries. The 1877 statue had been sponsored by a wealthy Mexican railway magnate, Antonio Escandón, who had collaborated with the French-supported regime of Maximilian of Habsburg. Creating a second Columbus monument with different symbolic signifiers for the Mexican capital. The statue was placed by the Buenavista railway station, at the time a major site in the capital. The Mexican government fully embraced the celebrations of the Columbus anniversary, with many state-sponsored events. The government also shaped the rhetoric concerning Columbus for their own ideological purposes, pointing to him as the one who initiated an era of global trade. The 1892 monument makes no reference to Spain, and the engraving on the pedestal reads simply "To Christopher Columbus. 12 October 1892" (A Cristóbal Colón. 12 de octubre de 1892). At the inauguration of the statue, there were speeches making reference to Spain, but the symbolism of Columbus was as navigator, not as a conqueror, an innocuous message at the time.

== See also ==
- List of monuments and memorials to Christopher Columbus
