= Vito Alessio Robles =

Mexican military officer, engineer and writer

Vito Alessio Robles José Vito Alessio Robles
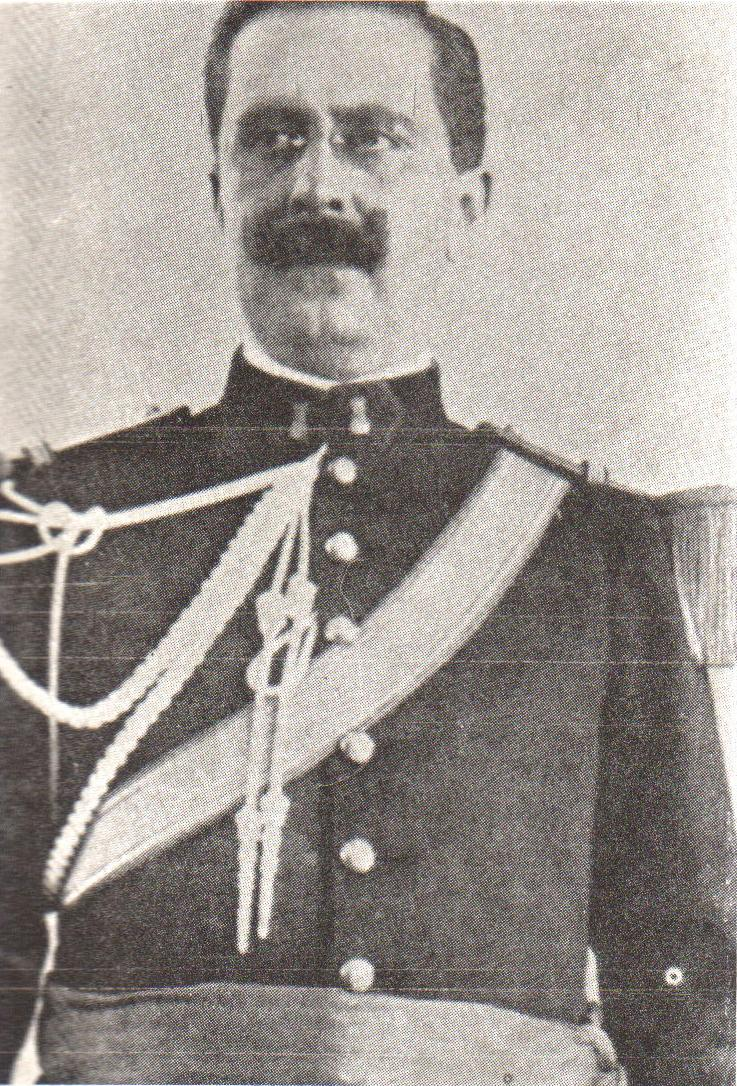
- Robles c. 1917

Deputy of the Congress of the Union for the 4th district of the Federal District
- In office 1 September 1920 – 31 August 1922
- Preceded by: Paulino Fontes
- Succeeded by: Rafael Pérez Taylor

Personal details
- Born: Vito Alessio Robles; August 14, 1879 Saltillo, Coahuila
- Died: June 11, 1957 (aged 77) Mexico
- Spouse: Espinosa Como Cuevas Trinidad
- Children: 7
- Parent(s): Dominic Alessio Bello (father); Crisanta Robles Rivas (mother)

General Vito Alessio Robles (August 14, 1879 – June 11, 1957) was a Mexican military officer, engineer, writer, journalist, diplomat, and academic who participated in the Mexican Revolution. He was one of the country's leading historians, as well as a politician, serving as a senator and opposition party leader. His work on the history of Coahuila y Tejas, in three volumes, is notable. He was temperamentally a public prosecutor and as a critic he spoke and wrote with total frankness. He is credited as the first generation of romantic revolutionaries of Mexico who dreamed and put to action the civic movement which would ensure better opportunities open to the people of Mexico.

== Early years ==
He was born in 1879 in Saltillo, Coahuila, (baptized 30 August 1879 – San Esteban protomártir), the eldest of the seven sons of Dominic Alessio Bello, a merchant from Salerno, Italy, and Crisanta Robles Rivas. His brothers, José Alessio Robles and Miguel Alessio Robles, were also military generals; his other siblings included Domingo Alessio Robles (1884–), María Catarina Alessio Robles (1886–), Ricardo Alessio Robles (1889), and María Alessio Robles (1890). He studied at the Ateneo Fuente. In 1896, he entered the Heroic Military Academy where he pursued a career in engineering, graduating in December 1903 as a lieutenant in the Corps of Engineers and served the same institution as a professor, and served the army with total loyalty. His campaign as an army officer covered México city, Jalapa, Monterrey and Sonora. He met his future wife, Espinosa Como Cuevas Trinidad at the Río Yaqui, Sonora. In the fight against Madero in Chihuahua, he was injured at Malpaso. He married Cuevas Espinosa in 1906, and they had four children, including the early women engineer Ángela Alessio Robles y Cuevas (b. 1917).

== Career ==
After his scholastic career, he was assigned the task of building Monterrey Square, barracks and Pótam Toros in the Yaqui region. He was also responsible for building the national dockyard at the Guaymas Port in Sonora. He was then given the war duty to fight the Yaqui Indians from 1905 to 1908. On his return from the military operations, in 1908, he was assigned the task of building the headquarters of La Piedad in the capital. In 1908 itself, he was made the Professor of Communications at the Military School. His campaign as an army officer covered México city, Jalapa, Monterrey and Sonora. He met his future wife, Espinosa Como Cuevas Trinidad at the río Yaqui, Sonora. In the fight against Madero in Chihuahua, he was injured at Malpaso.

After his return to the capital he held several public offices and was chief of staff of Manuel Gordillo. He was assigned as Military Attache, from October 1912 to February 1913, at the Legation of Mexico in Rome. He took voluntary discharge from the army and then joined the revolutionary movement of Francisco I, as he did not agree with the regime of Victoriano Huerta. Alessio Robles was Governor of the Mexican Federal District for one year from 1 January 1915.

After 1920, he led a deputation by the Federal District V District and was a senator of Coahuila in 1922. As senator he was an exemplary parliamentarian in the same category as Belisario Dominguez. As a journalist and parliamentarian, he was aggressive. During this time, he was assigned as Minister Plenipotentiary to Sweden. After returning from Sweden, he was made the Technical Advisor to the Ministry of Agriculture and Development. On August 9, 1921, his brother, General Joseph Alessio Robles, was killed in Mexico City. Gen. Jacinto B. Trevino was accused the perpetrator of the crime; due to insufficient evidence he was released. This caused a permanent rift with his brother Miguel as Vito was accused for not bringing the culprit to justice.

During his political career between 1927 and 1928, he contested for the post of Governor of Coahuila but lost the election. He was then sent to the United States where he worked in Austin, Texas. Here, he undertook the study of historical documents at the University of Texas at Austin. This assignment enabled him to gather enough material which helped him to launch his literary interests of writing books on history. When he returned to Mexico, he was made the professor of the National Preparatory School and the Faculty of Arts of the City of Mexico. He was also responsible during this period to found the Seminary of Mexican Culture; in the role of a founding member he traveled to many provinces on cultural missions. He was elected member of the Academia Mexicana de la Historia, in 1937. From 1947 to 1950, he was Professor of History of the Provincias Internas of New Spain in the Faculty of Philosophy and Letters. He died in Mexico City on 11 June 1957 at Ciudad de México, District Federal, México at the age of 78 years. His daughter Angela inherited his vast library.

== Writings ==
His journalist career started in 1927 in El Universal, the Democratic City newspaper. He published his first book "Bibliography of Coahuila" covering both history and Geography; this collection was edited by Genaro Estrada. As writer of history his other books included many other publications. His three volume work on the "History of Coahuila y Texas" is a monumental work which gives a comprehensive history of Texas. The "eponymous" historian Alessio Robles's book collection is an important collection of 14,000 volumes (17th to 19th century) in the museum named "Centro Cultural Vito Alessio Robles" in Saltillo. Some of his other notable books are Saltillo, en la Historia y en la Leyenda, Coahuila y Texas, desde la consumación de la independencia hasta el tratado de paz de Guadalupe Hidalgo, and Coahuila y Texas en la época colonial.

== Publications ==
(in Spanish)

- Comunicaciones de campaña (1910–1912) [Campaign Communications (1910–1912)]
- Francisco de Urdiñola y el norte de la Nueva España (1931) [Urdiñola Francisco and northern New Spain (1931)]
- Coahuila y Texas en la época colonial (1938) [Coahuila and Texas in colonial times (1938)]
- Cómo se ha escrito la historia de Coahuila (1931) [The history of Coahuila (1931)]
- Unas páginas traspapeladas de la historia de Coahuila y Texas. El derrotero de la entrada a Texas del gobernador de Coahuila, sargento mayor Martín de Alarcón (1932) [A misplaced page of history of Coahuila and Texas: The course of the entrance to the Governor of Coahuila Texas, Sergeant Major Martin de Alarcón (1932)]
- La primera imprenta en Coahuila (1932) [The first printing in Coahuila (1932)]
- El derrotero de Martín Alarcón en Texas (1933) [The course of Martin Alarcon in Texas (1933)]
- Etimologías bastardeadas (1934) [Bastardized etymologies (1934)]
- Saltillo en la historia y en la leyenda (1934) [Saltillo in history and legend (1934)]
- Fray Agustín de Morfi y su obra (1935) [Fray Agustin de Morfi and his work (1935)]
- Monterrey en la historia y en la leyenda (1936) [Monterrey in history and legend (1936)]
- Acapulco en la historia y en la leyenda (1936) [Acapulco in history and legend (1936)]
- Desfile sangriento (1936) [Bloody Parade (1936)]
- Ramos Arizpe (1937) [Ramos Arizpe (1937)]
- Los tratados de Bucareli (1937) [Bucareli treaties (1937)]
- Bosquejos históricos (1938) [Historic Sketches (1938)]
- Mis andanzas con nuestro Ulises (1938) [My adventures with our Ulysses (1938)]
- La primera imprenta en las Provincias Internas de Oriente, Texas, Tamaulipas, Nuevo León y Coahuila (1939) [The first printing press in the Eastern Provinces, Texas, Tamaulipas, Nuevo León and Coahuila (1939)]
- Heráldica coahuilense (1943) [Coahuilense Heraldry (1943)]
- Alejandro de Humboldt: su vida y su obra (1940) [Alejandro de Humboldt: his life and work (1940)]
- Las condiciones sociales en el norte de la Nueva España (1945–46) [Society in northern New Spain (1945–46)]
- Coahuila y Texas desde la consumación de la Independencia hasta el tratado de paz de Guadalupe Hidalgo (1945–1946) [Coahuila and Texas from the consummation of Independence until the peace treaty of Guadalupe Hidalgo (1945–1946)]
- Diuscurso pronunciado en la apertura de la IV Convención del Partido Nacional Antirreeleccionista [Diuscurso delivered at the opening of the National Party Convention IV Antirreeleccionista]
- La convención revolucionaria de Aguascalientes [The revolutionary convention of Aguascalientes]

== See also ==
- List of people on stamps of Mexico
- List of heads of government of the Mexican Federal District
