= Ángela Alessio Robles =

Mexican civil engineer and town planner

- Born: Ángela María Alessio Robles y Cuevas; 30 March 1917; Mexico City, Mexico
- Died: 27 April 2004 (aged 87); Mexico City, Mexico
- Education: Universidad Nacional Autónoma de México
- Occupations: Civil engineer, town planner

Ángela María Alessio Robles y Cuevas (30 March 1917 - 27 April 2004) was a Mexican civil engineer and town planner. In the late 1940s and 1950s she was Director General of Planning for the capital of Mexico City, and then the President of Planning and Director of the Plan for Urban Development in the city. She later moved to Monterrey and oversaw the development of the Macroplaza there, one of the largest plazas in the world and the largest in Mexico.

== Early life and education ==
Ángela María Alessio Robles y Cuevas (known as Ángela Alessio Robles) was born in Mexico City on 30 March 1917, one of four children of Espinosa Como Cuevas Trinidad and General Vito Alessio Robles. Her mother was of Yaqui heritage and her father was a military officer, engineer and academic of Italian and Tlaxcaltec descent who played a key role in the Mexican Revolution (1910 - 1920). The couple had met when her father was sent on a military campaign to subdue the Yaqui peoples in the state of Sonora and had married in 1906.

In 1938, Alessio Robles entered the Escuela Nacional de Ingenieros (School of Engineering) in the Universidad Nacional Autónoma de México. Five years later she graduated as a civil engineer, having written a thesis Control y regularización de las corrientes del Valle de México: proyecto de los muros de retención para las presas escalonadas (Control and regularisation of the currents of the Valley of Mexico: a project for the retaining walls for the staggered dams). She was the fourth woman to graduate from the institution.

In 1946, Alessio Robles studied for a Master of Science degree in Planning and Housing at Columbia University, New York.

== Career ==
In the mid-1940s, she taught mathematics at the Escuela Nacional Preparatoria, a preparatory school for National Autonomous University of Mexico in Mexico City for a short time.

In 1948, she began work as Director General of Planning in the Mexican capital, later becoming President of Planning and Director of the Plan for Urban Development in the city. During her time in these positions, the Law of Urban Development and the Regulatory Plan of Mexico City were finalised, and a link was established with the State of Mexico to find joint solutions to shared problems and to anticipate growth as the city developed into a conurbation. Significant construction projects were undertaken in the capital during her tenure, including the Torre Latinoamericana, the Autodromo Hermanos Rodríguez, the Centro Médico La Raza hospital complex, road development and housing developments for state workers.

She was later Secretary of Urban Development of the State of Nuevo León and oversaw the construction of the Macroplaza in the heart of the city of Monterrey, Mexico in the 1980s. It is one of the largest plazas in the world and the largest in Mexico, covering 400,000 square metres and hosting monuments, smaller plazas and gardens.

== Honours and commemoration ==
- In 1965, she was named Woman of the Year.
- In 1968, she received the Legión de Honor Mexicana.
- In the 1970s, she was named Woman of the Decade.
- She was a member of the College of Civil Engineers of Mexico, and president of the Environment Committee in 1992.
- Calle Ángela Alessio street in the borough of Álvaro Obregón in Mexico City, is named in her honour.
