= Tlahuicole =

Otomitl warrior

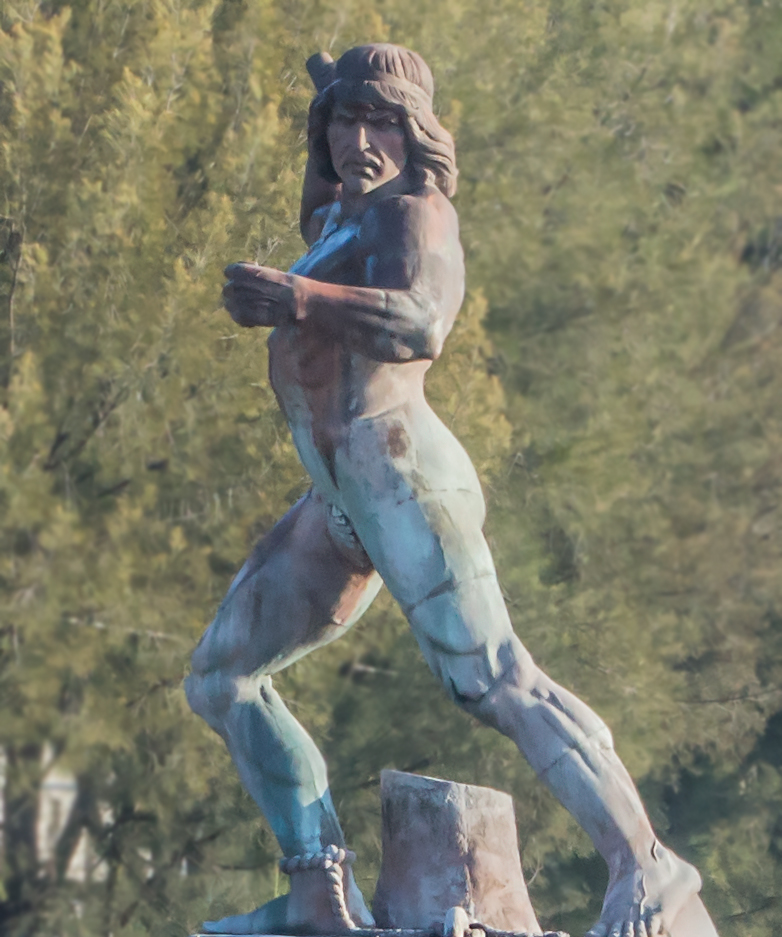
Tlahuicole statue (1852), by Manuel Vilar, Tlaxcala.

Tlahuicole or Tlahuicolli (c. 1497–1518) was a Tlaxcaltec warrior noted for his martial skill and ethical standards.

== Biography ==
Tlahuicole was regarded as the most formidable hero of his country, and commanded the Tlaxcaltec forces in the civil war in 1516 between the partisans of Cacamatzin and Ixtlilxochitl II.

He fought with a heavy club that an ordinary soldier could barely lift from the ground.

He was taken prisoner by stratagem and brought to Mexico-Tenochtitlan, the Aztec capital, but his bravery and character made such an impression on Moctezuma II that he ordered the captive's release, an act unprecedented in Mexican history. But Tlahuicole refused to profit by the monarch's generosity. He said to Moctezuma that it would be infamous for him to return to his country after being conquered, and insisted on suffering the fate of the other prisoners. Moctezuma, anxious to save his life, offered him the command of an army about to be sent against the Purépechas, who had invaded his frontiers.

Tlahuicole accepted Moctezuma's offer, hoping to meet a glorious death in the ensuing battle. He advanced at the head of the Mexica troops to the city of Tangimoroa, called by the Mexicas Tlaximaloyan (modern Ciudad Hidalgo), cut through the Purépecha army, which made a desperate resistance, and defeated them several times. He returned to Tenochtitlan, laden with spoils and accompanied by a long train of captives. Moctezuma lavished fresh honors on him, but failed to persuade him to accept the perpetual office of commander-in-chief or to return to his native country. He refused constantly, alleging that to do the first would be treason to his country, and to do the second would be a stain on his glory.

At last Moctezuma consented to satisfy the desire of his general, and ordered him to be tied to the stone of the gladiators for the final contest. He was armed in the usual fashion, and Moctezuma, with all his court, was present at the spectacle. Eight famous warriors of Anahuac attacked him one after the other, and were all disabled: the ninth, however, stunned him with a blow, and he was then put to death, with the customary ceremonies.
