= Mario de la Cueva =

Mexican jurist and rector

Mario de la Cueva y de la Rosa (1901–1981) was a Mexican jurist and rector of the Universidad Nacional Autónoma de México (UNAM) in 1940–1942.

De la Cueva studied law at the Escuela Nacional de Jurisprudencia of the UNAM, as well as at the Humboldt-Universität in Berlin. From 1929 to 1961, he taught constitutional law and labour law at the UNAM, where he received several academic honours.

He is mostly noted for his works on labour law, Derecho Mexicano del Trabajo (1938) and El Nuevo Derecho Mexicano del Trabajo (1972), which remain in wide use as textbooks across Latin America. Infused with the spirit of the Mexican Revolution of 1910, they conceptualized Mexican labour law as having the protection of workers' rights as its chief purpose. De la Cueva was also a leading advisor in the 1970 revision of the Mexican Labour Code.

== Tierra Nueva magazine ==
In 1939, as general secretary of the university, Mario de la Cueva proposed to the poet Jorge González Durán, at the time a student of the School of Philosophy and Literature, the creation of a university literary magazine. This publication would be called Tierra Nueva, with its first issue appearing in January 1940, and edited by González Durán, together with Leopoldo Zea, José Luis Martínez, and Alí Chumacero.
