= Cri-Cri (character) =

Mexican cartoon character

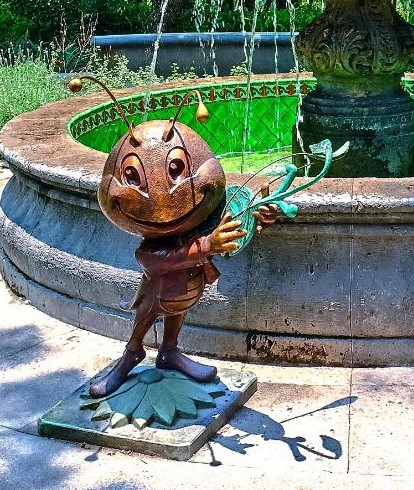
- First appearance: 1934
- Created by: Francisco Gabilondo Soler

In-universe information
- Species: Cricket
- Gender: Male
- Nationality: Mexican

Cri-Cri (also known as "El grillito cantor" or "the singing cricket"), is a Mexican fictional character, an anthropomorphic cricket, created by Francisco Gabilondo Soler in 1934 while broadcasting his own musical radio show on Mexico's station XEW. Cri-Cri is known as the “grillito cantor” or “the singing cricket.” He was created by Gabilondo Soler in his childhood and may even be considered “his inner personality.” The character became so famous and gave its author such renown that it became a second name for Gabilondo. In the mid part of the 20th century, he became one of the most prominent children's singers in Spanish.

== Legacy ==
Disney offered to animate one of Cri-Cri's most popular songs "Cochinitos Dormilones" (Sleepy Piggies), and incorporated aspects of his own Three Little Pigs short into it. Walt Disney's character of Jiminy Cricket may have been inspired by the famous Mexican character.

The character is the brand ambassador for Banco Bilbao Vizcaya Argentaria.
