= Manuel Vilar =

Spanish sculptor

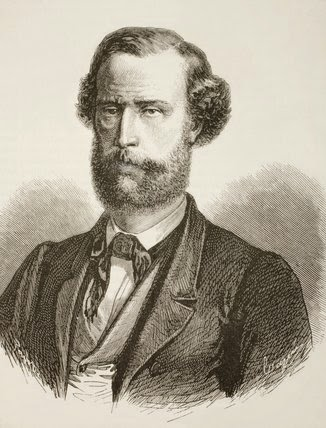
- Born: Manuel Vilar i Roca; 15 November 1812; Mataró, Catalonia, France
- Died: 25 November 1860 (aged 48); Mexico City, Mexico
- Known for: Sculpture
- Movement: Romanticism

Manuel Vilar i Roca (15 November 1812, Barcelona - 25 November 1860, Mexico City) was a Spanish sculptor, in the Romantic style.

== Biography ==
His first studies were at the Escola de la Llotja, with Damià Campeny. In 1833, with a grant from the Board of Commerce, he went to Rome where he studied with Antoni Solà and was an assistant in the workshops of Pietro Tenerani. He also received advice from Bertel Thorvaldsen and was influenced by the Nazarene movement.

Upon his return to Spain, he became an instructor at the Escola. He served in that position until 1845, when he and the painter Pelegrí Clavé received offers of employment in Mexico. There, he became the head of the sculpture classes at the Academia de San Carlos.

During his tenure, he insisted on the rigorous study of anatomical models, the sketching of classical examples, practicing on blocks of marble, making plaster castings, and modelling with clay. He worked with religious and historical subjects, as well as the classics, which included themes from the Pre-Hispanic history of Mexico. Although his style owed much to Romanticism, he also introduced elements of Realism; giving his work an eclectic character.

His early works, in Barcelona, focused on Biblical and mythological subjects; including Jason stealing the Golden Fleece and the trial of Daniel in Babylon. His specifically Mexican subjects include Moctezuma, La Malinche, Iturbide and Tlahuicole, as well as numerous busts; notably Lucas Alamán and Antonio López de Santa Anna. He also created a statue of San Carlos Borromeo, which may be seen on the patio of the Academia.

He died of pneumonia, aged only forty-eight, and was interred at the iglesia de Jesús Nazareno, where his students created a monument in his memory.

=== Gallery ===
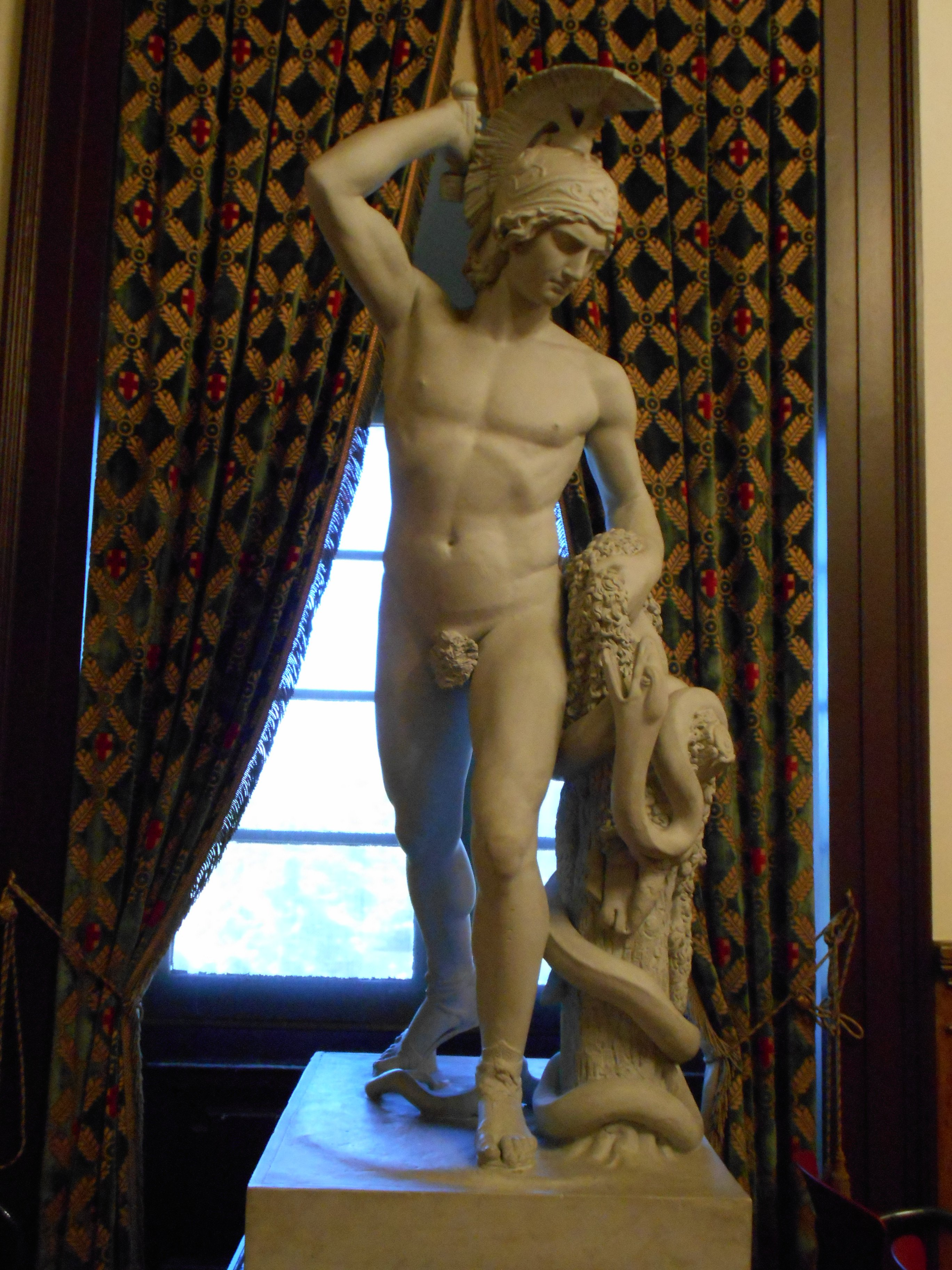
Jason Stealing the Golden Fleece

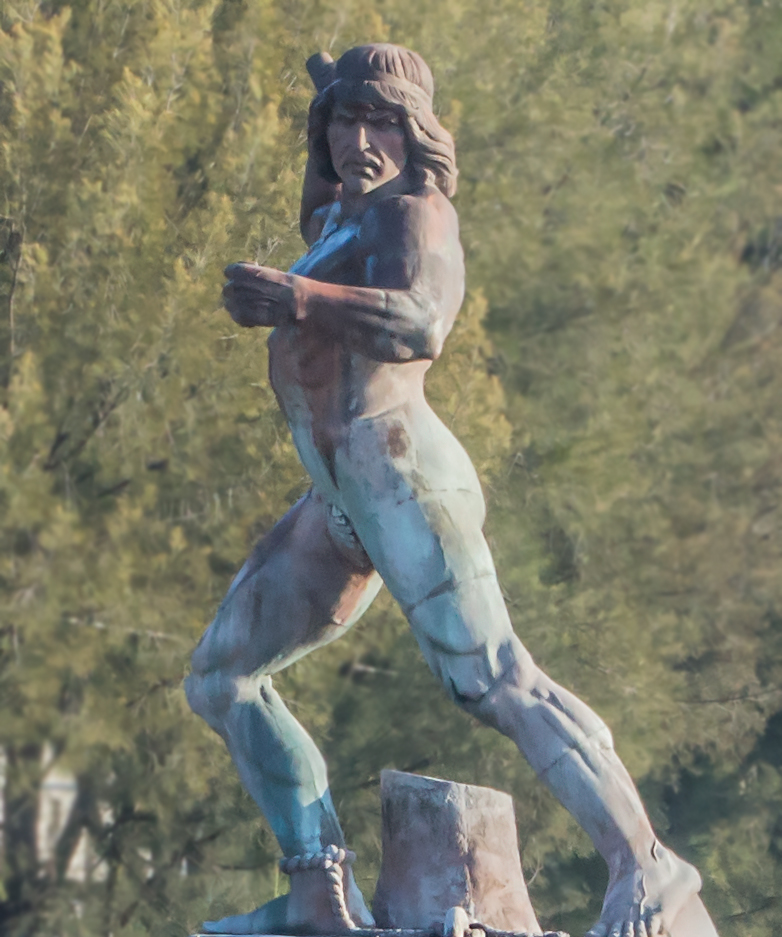
Monument to Tlahuicole, Tlaxcala

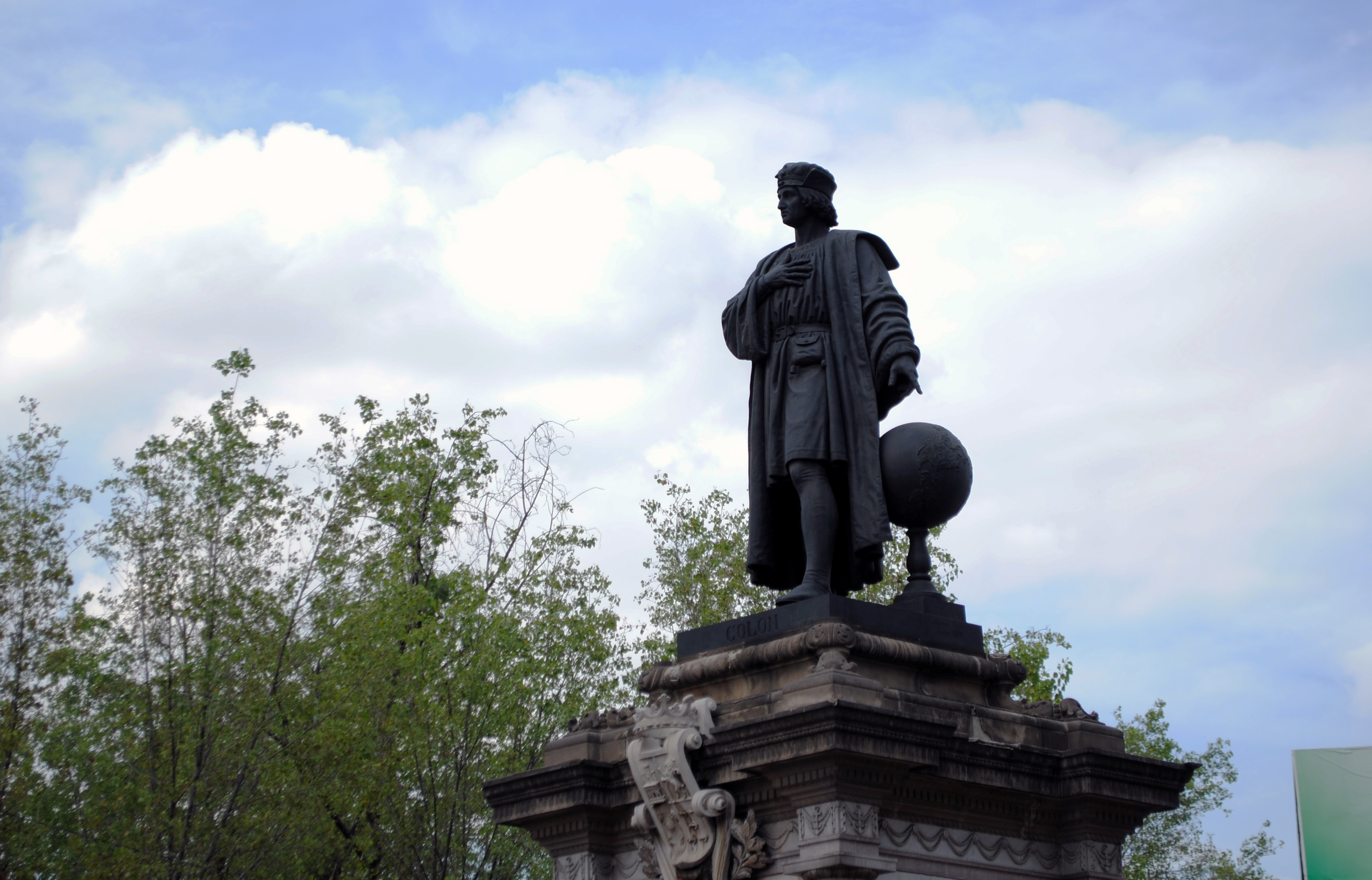
Monument to Columbus, Mexico City

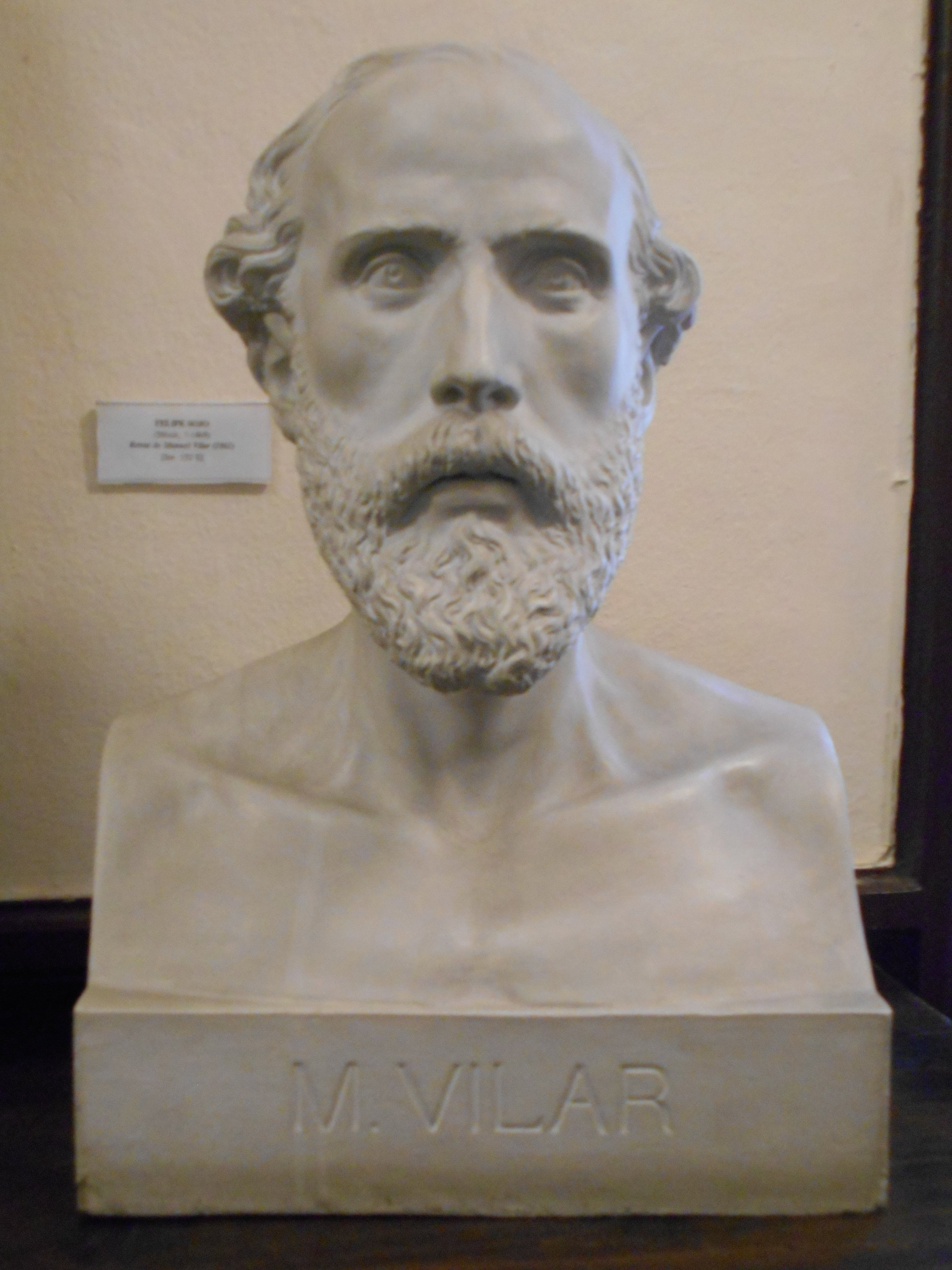
A bust of Manuel Vilar,
by Felipe Sojo (1833-1869)
