= Francisco Gabilondo Soler =

Mexican musician (1907–1990)

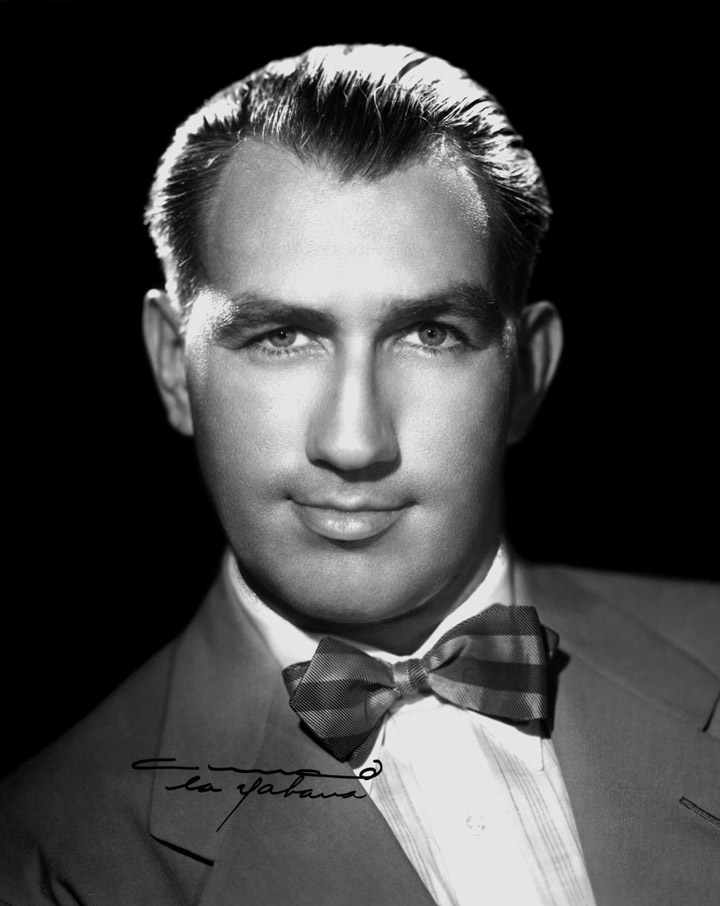
- Gabilondo Soler in 1948
- Born: 6 October 1907; Orizaba, Veracruz, Mexico.
- Died: 14 December 1990 (aged 83); Texcoco de Mora, State of Mexico, Mexico.
- Occupations: Singer and composer
- Years active: 1928–1985
- Known for: creator of Cri-Cri (character)

Francisco Gabilondo Soler (October 6, 1907, Orizaba, Veracruz, Mexico – December 14, 1990, Texcoco, State of Mexico) was a Mexican composer and performer of children's songs. He recorded and performed those songs under the name of Cri-Cri: El Grillito Cantor ("Cri-Cri: The Little Singing Cricket").

== Biography ==
Gabilondo was born in the city of Orizaba, Veracruz. Both his parents were children of Spanish immigrants to Mexico. During his childhood he read the stories of the Brothers Grimm and Hans Christian Andersen, as well as the adventure stories of such writers as Jules Verne and Emilio Salgari. He also taught himself to play the pianola. In 1928, he entered the National Observatory of Mexico to study astronomy, but his studies were cut short by a lack of resources. Before dedicating himself to music full-time, he practiced boxing, bullfighting and swimming. He also worked for a time as a linotypist.

When he was 25 years old, he began performing as a professional musician, interpreting humorous subjects of his inspiration. At first he played in public bath houses. He entered the new field of radio to become one of the main figures in the "Golden Age of Mexican Radio", beginning with humorous and social criticism programs, using the sobriquet El Guasón del Teclado (The Joker of the Keyboard). He used the experiences of his childhood to write some children's songs, and on October 15, 1934, he appeared, for the first time, on Radio Station XEW in Mexico City, singing many of the songs he had previously written. This marked the first performance in his persona as 'Cri-Cri'. The first songs to be played were "El ratón vaquero" (The cowboy mouse), "Los mosquitos trompeteros" (The trumpeter mosquitoes), "Negrito Sandía" (Little Black Boy Watermelon), "Cucurumbé", and "La Muñeca fea" (The ugly doll).

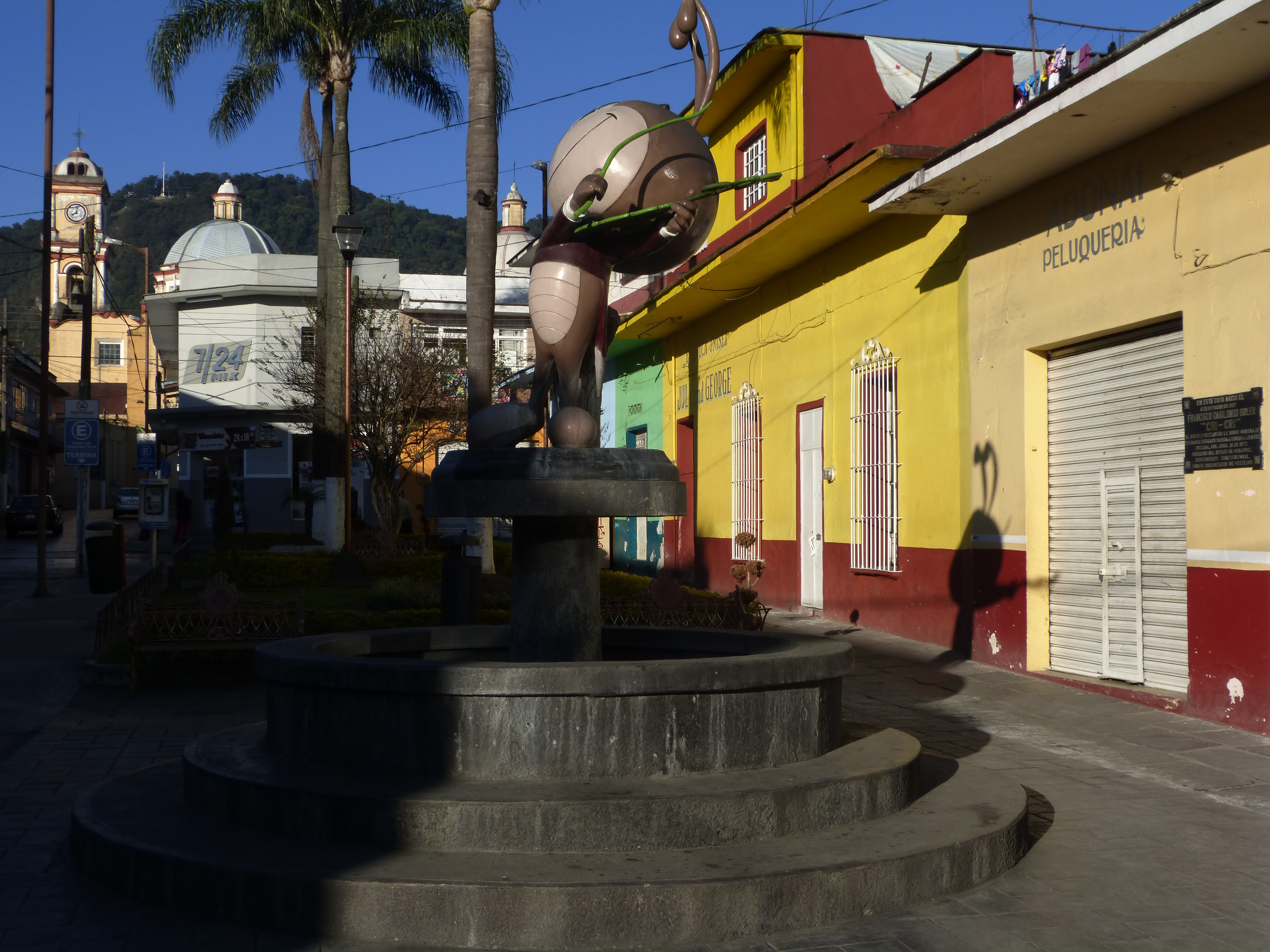
The House where Francisco "Cri-Cri" Gabilondo was born in Orizaba, Veracruz. Both his parents were children of Spanish immigrants to Mexico. A statue of the "grillo cantor" has been placed on the plaza in front of it, and a plaque on the wall of the house commemorates his birth.

Between 1941 and 1944 he served in the Mexican merchant marine travelling around South America. He returned to Radio Station XEW in 1944 and continued his shows there for the next 28 years. He retired in 1962.

Despite never finishing his astronomical studies, he maintained a lifelong passion for the field, being inducted into the Sociedad Astronómica de México (Astronomical Society of Mexico) and having an observatory built in Tultepec. A film about his life was made in 1963 called Cri-Cri, el grillito cantor starring Ignacio López Tarso and Marga López.

In 1984, he was honored in a special ceremony dedicated to him, where he was just accompanied by the piano. Francisco Gabilondo Soler "The Singing Cricket", died on December 14, 1990, of cardiac disease, at the age of 83 years.

== Career ==
Francisco Gabilondo Soler was 25 years old when he started his professional musical career.

At first he did not write children's songs, but he soon realized that most of his fans were children, so he decided to concentrate his efforts on writing songs for children. Gabilondo Soler composed a total of 210 songs, of which three are unaccounted for. Almost all his songs are stories that teach values to children. He had the tendency to give animals and things human-like characteristics, and wrote songs about dolls, animals and toys who had something special about them that separated them from the rest.

On October 15, 1934, he performed on the XEW radio for the first time, singing his own songs. "CRI-CRI" the singing cricket was born that day. In 1944 Gabilondo Soler created his own radio show on XEW where he played his songs for people of all ages.

Gabilondo's songs have also been recorded by opera singer Plácido Domingo, French singer Mireille Mathieu, and Argentine singer Libertad Lamarque, among other world-famous performers.

He recorded Cri-Cri, El Grillito Cantor (1956), Homenaje a Cri-Cri (1957), Mas Canciones del Grillito Cantor (1958), Los Amigos de Cri-Cri (1959), Cuentos y Canciones de Cri-Cri (1963), Todo el Año con Cri-Cri (1963) 30 Aniversario de Cri-Cri (1964), Conejo Blas a Dónde Vas (1964) and several other collections of his songs.

In 1979, "El Chavo" paid tribute to Francisco Soler with the song "Gracias Cri Cri".

== Style ==
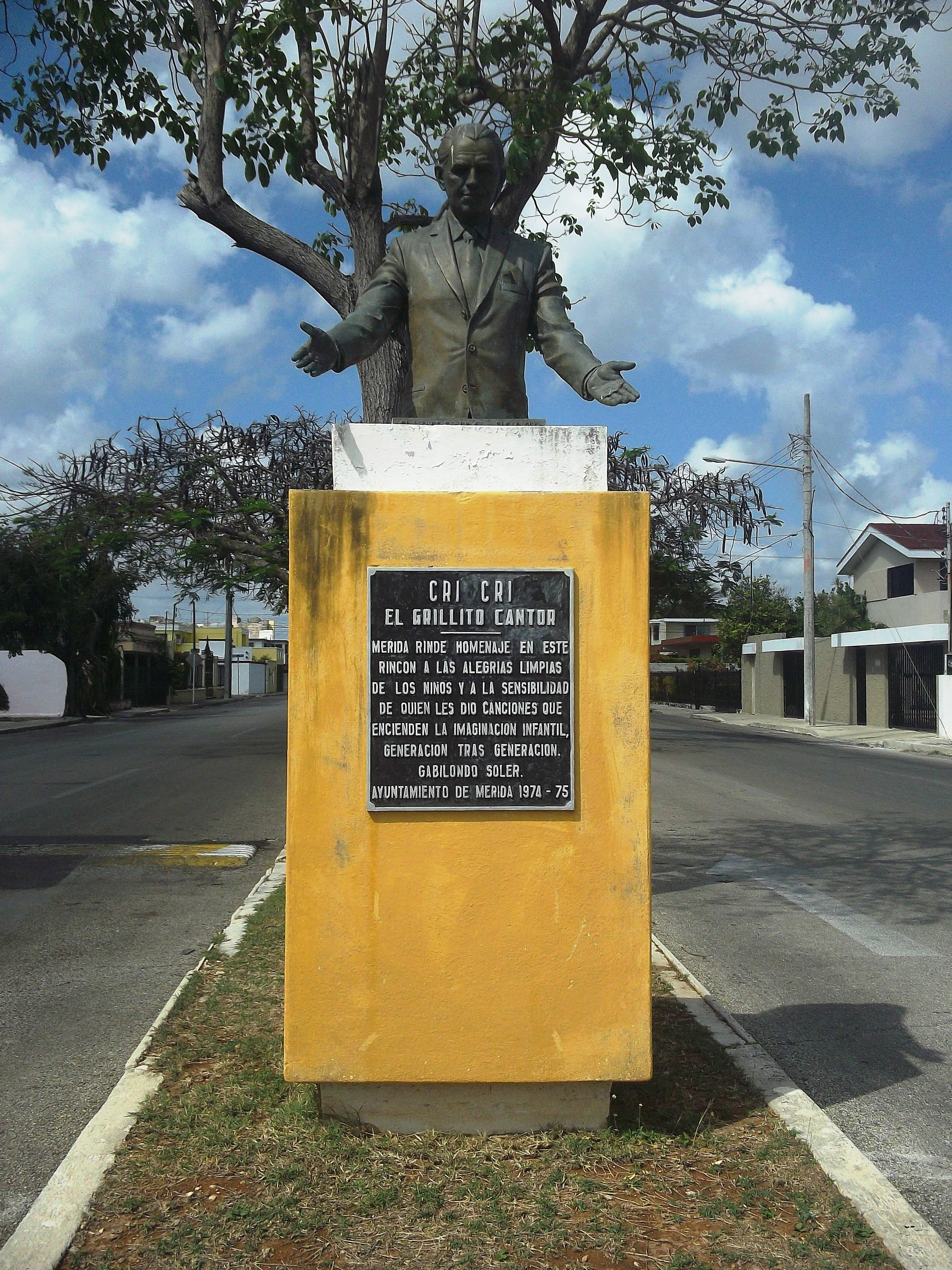
Francisco Gabilondo Soler Monument in Yucatán

Francisco Gabilondo Soler mixed a variety of styles in his songs, including the fox trot, tango (such as in the song "Che Araña"), U.S. country music ("El Raton Vaquero") and Mexican ranchera music, employing unique orchestration and rhythm. Cri-Cri's songs, of which he wrote both the music and the lyrics, became fables with both an educational and entertainment value. Some of his songs remained popular over the decades such that a few of his characters have become recognizable in Mexican popular culture, such as "La Muñeca Fea" ("The Ugly Doll"), a song that tells the story of an old broken doll thay is forgotten in an attic and is befriended by a mouse.

=== Songs ===
His songs have been translated into many languages including French, English, Portuguese and Russian. More than songs, Francisco Gabilondo Soler created stories with music, making children all over the world dream with them.

Some songs performed by Cri-Crí:

- Abuelita (Di Por Qué)
- Acuarela
- Al Agua Todos
- Barquito de Nuez
- Batallón de Plomo
- Bombón I
- Caminito de la escuela
- Campanita y Juan Pestañas
- Canción de las Brujas
- Canción de Reyes
- La Negrita Cucurumbé
- La Muñeca Fea
- La Marcha de las Letras
- Orquesta de Animales
- La Patita
- Lunada
- El Chorrito
- El Comal le Dijo a la Olla
- El Ratón Vaquero
- El Rey de Chocolate
- Cochinitos Dormilones
- Casamiento de los Palomos
- El Comal y la Olla
- La Merienda
- Negrito Bailarín
- Papá Elefante
- La Sirenita

== Miscellaneous ==
In 2007, for the centennial celebration of his birth, the dance company at the Palacio de Bellas Artes prepared a show based on his work. The choreography uses his most representative songs, and the scenes are filled with images of the characters from songs such as "El ratón vaquero" (The cowboy mouse), "Los mosquitos trompeteros" (The trumpeter mosquitoes) and "La muñeca fea" (The ugly doll). This homage to Cri-Crí was set to run through 2008.
