= Odalisque (disambiguation) =

An odalisque was a female slave of a Turkish harem.

Odalisque may also refer to:

- The common name of the damselfly Epallage fatime
- Odalisque (novel), a novel by Fiona McIntosh
- Odalisque, part of Quicksilver (Stephenson novel) by Neal Stephenson, later published as a separate novel
- Odalisque with Raised Arms, a painting by Henri Matisse
- Odalisque (painting), a painting by Filipino painter and revolutionary activist Juan Luna
- Grande Odalisque, also known as Une Odalisque or La Grande Odalisque, a painting by Jean Auguste Dominique Ingres
- Odalisque, a song on the Decemberists' album Castaways and Cutouts
- The Odalisque (painting), a painting by Marià Fortuny
