= Baldomer Galofre =

Spanish painter

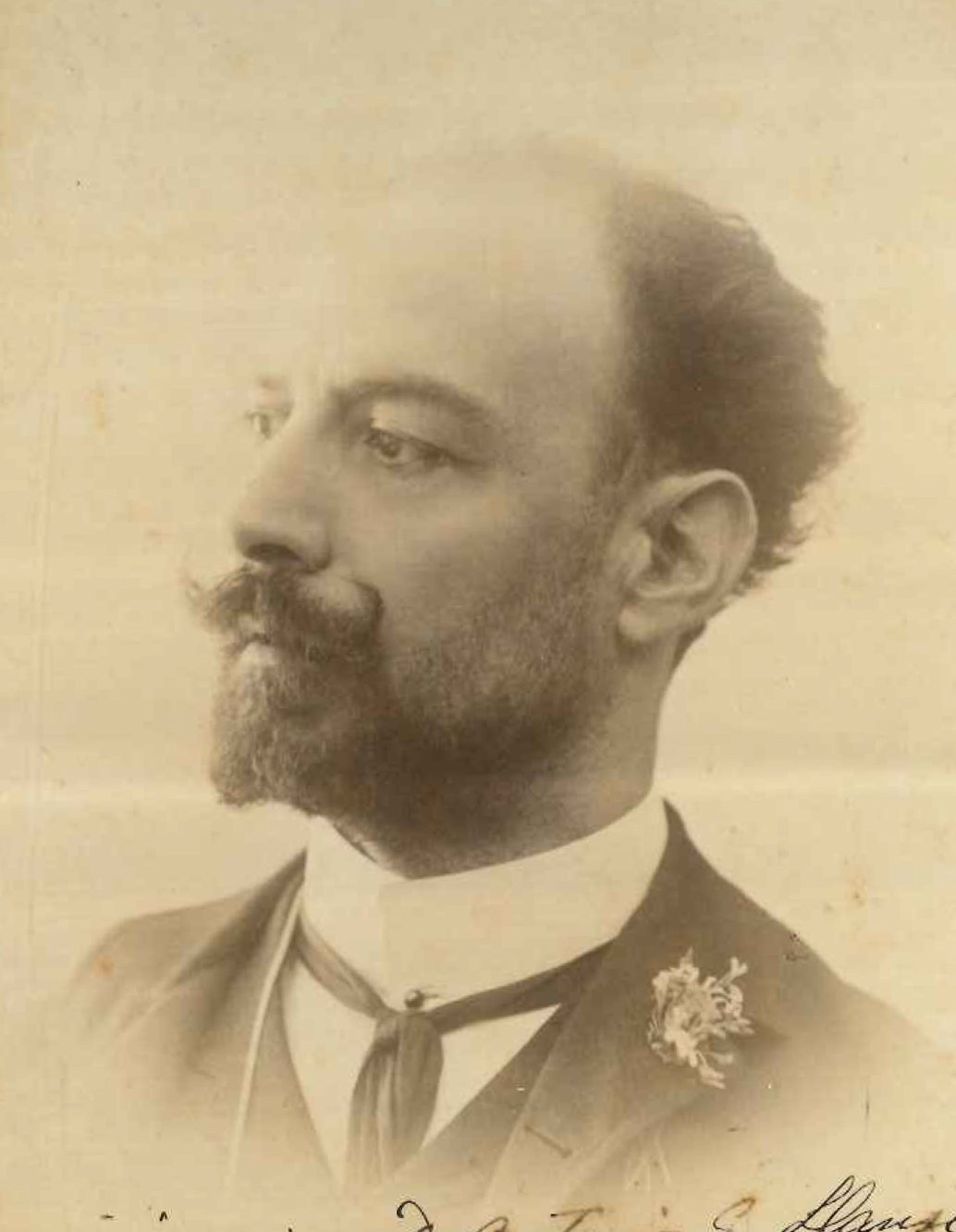
- Baldomer Galofre by Antoni Esplugas (1888)
- Born: Baldomer Galofre i Giménez; 25 May 1845; Reus, Catalonia, Spain
- Died: 26 July 1902 (aged 57); Barcelona, Catalonia, Spain
- Known for: Painting

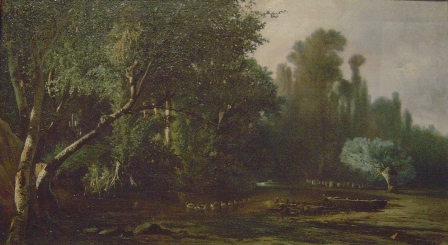
Landscape with Ducks (1871)

Baldomer Galofre i Giménez, in Spanish: Baldomero Galofré y Jiménez (25 May 1845 – 26 July 1902) was a Spanish painter.

== Biography ==
Galofre was born in Reus. His first art lessons were in the workshop of the amateur painter and wine merchant, Domènec Soberano, when he was still quite young. Shortly after, his family moved to Barcelona, where he was enrolled at the Escola de la Llotja and studied with Ramon Martí Alsina. He later moved to Madrid to continue his studies.

His first exhibition was at the "Exposició de Belles Arts del 1866" in Barcelona, where he presented his work "Els traginers" (The Porters). He later participated in the Barcelona exhibitions of 1870 and 1872, as well as one in Zaragoza in 1868, where he presented a series of landscapes depicting the hills of Montjuïc and Vallvidrera as well as some maritime paintings. His watercolors won a silver medal at an exposition in Salamanca.

From 1870 to 1882, he lived in Rome on a pension, granted by the First Republic, while he studied at the "Academia Española de Bellas Artes de Roma", a branch of the Real Academia de Bellas Artes de San Fernando. At this time, he came under the influence of Marià Fortuny, but preserved his own style; especially his use of color.

His personal exhibition in Barcelona in 1884 was very popular. Narcís Oller praised his sense of naturalism and skill at history painting. At an exhibition in Madrid in 1890, one of his works was purchased by Queen María Cristina. In 1886, he became a regular contributor to the Sala Parés. His final work "El cavall més valent" (The Bravest Horse) was left unfinished at his death, but sold for 20,000 Pesetas. He died in Barcelona, aged 57.

Despite his reputation, his popularity quickly faded and a major retrospective at the Museu Municipal de Belles Arts de Barcelona (the predecessor of MNAC) in 1903 was poorly attended.
