= Josep Tapiró Baró =

Spanish painter (1836–1913)

Josep Tapiró i Baró
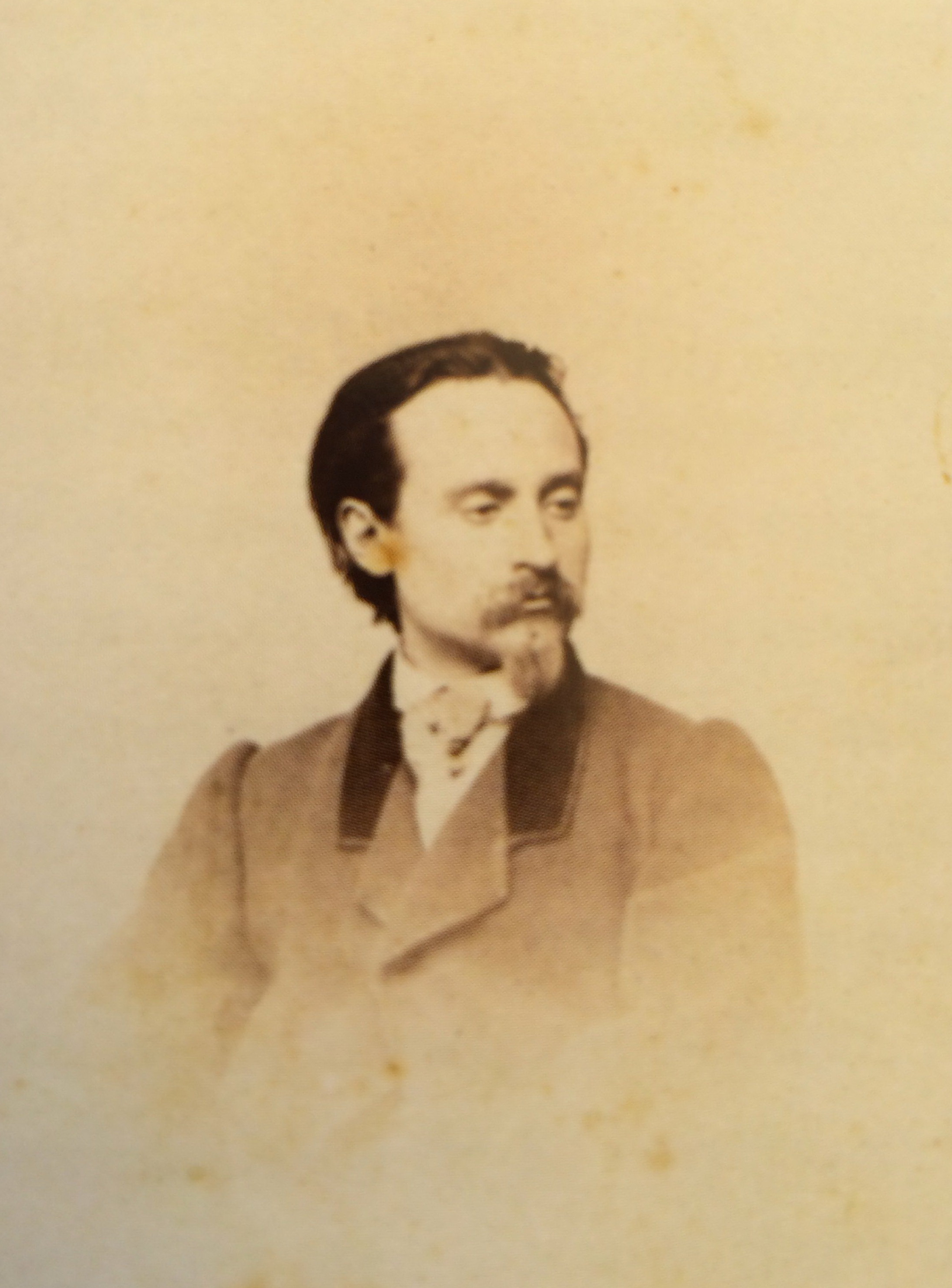
- Photograph from 1864, taken in Rome
- Born: 7 February 1836; Reus, Catalonia, Spain
- Died: 4 October 1913 (aged 77); Tangier, Morocco
- Known for: Painting, Watercolor
- Movement: Orientalism

Josep Tapiró i Baró (17 February 1836, Reus – 4 October 1913, Tangier) was a Spanish painter, best known for his watercolor portraits from Morocco.

== Biography ==
His parents owned a hardware store. As with many future artists, he displayed an early affinity for drawing. His first formal studies were in 1849 with Domènec Soberano, a local wine merchant and amateur painter. In 1853, he and his fellow student, Marià Fortuny, were given the opportunity to exhibit at a showing held by the Casino de Reus.

Later that year, he and Fortuny enrolled at the Escola de la Llotja, where he studied with Claudi Lorenzale, a painter associated with the German Nazarene movement, among others. At this time, he produced mostly historical and religious scenes.

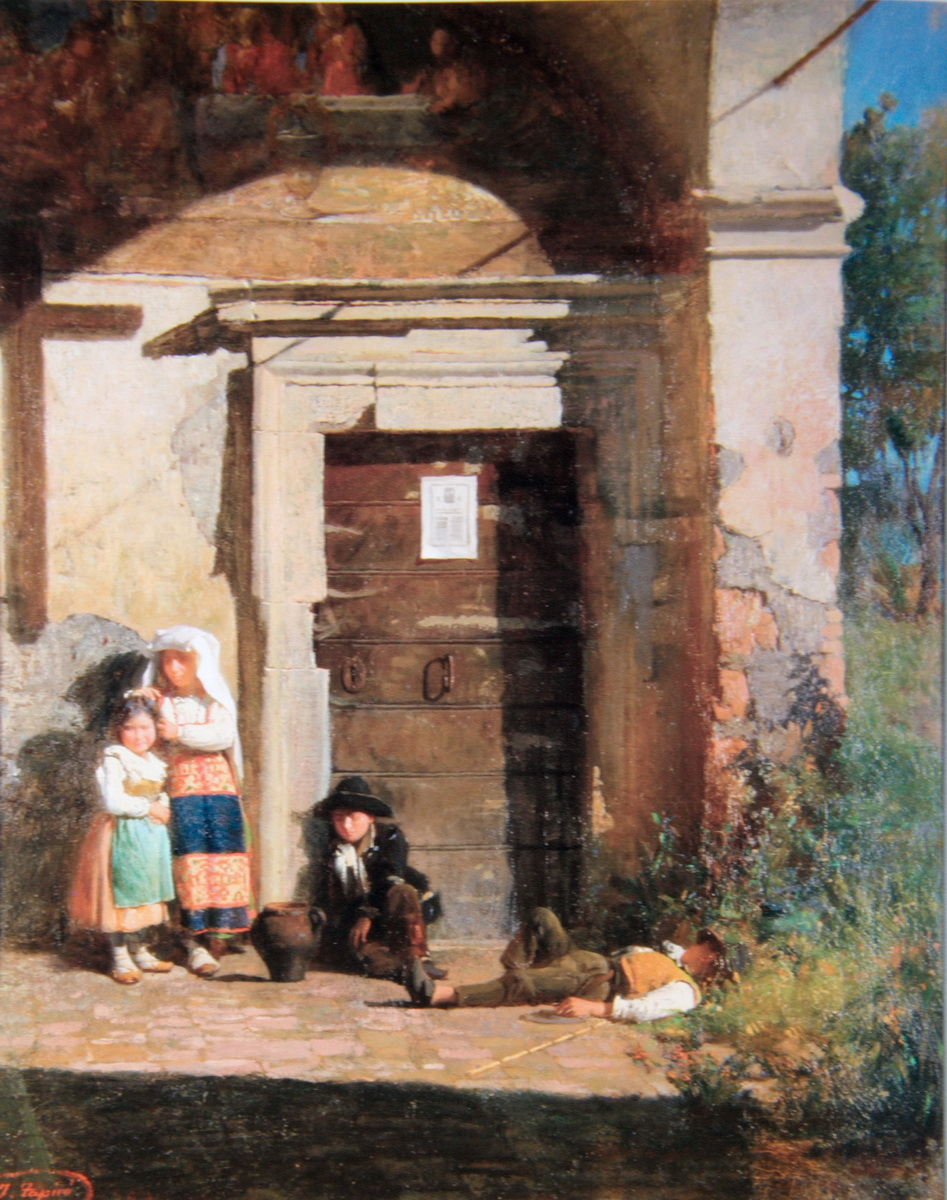
Children Under the Porch, from his time in Rome.

In 1857 he, Fortuny and two others were given the opportunity to compete for a grant to study in Rome. Fortuny was chosen and Tapiró moved to Madrid, where he enrolled at the "Escuela Superior de Pintura y Grabado", a branch of the Real Academia de Bellas Artes de San Fernando. His instructor there was Federico de Madrazo. He returned to Barcelona in 1860 and assisted with decorating the façade at the Palau de la Generalitat de Catalunya

In 1862, he joined his friend, Fortuny, in Rome and was introduced to his circle of artistic acquaintances who met at the Antico Caffè Greco. They also visited Naples and Florence together. While there, he took evening classes to learn how to paint watercolors and his works began to focus more on genre themes. These works became very popular and established his reputation.

In 1871 he, Fortuny and Bernardo Ferrándiz took a trip to Tangier. This would prove decisive for his career. In 1873, he held his first showing of Orientalist paintings at the "International Art Circle of Rome". Fortuny's sudden death in 1874 affected Tapiró deeply, and prompted his decision to leave Rome.

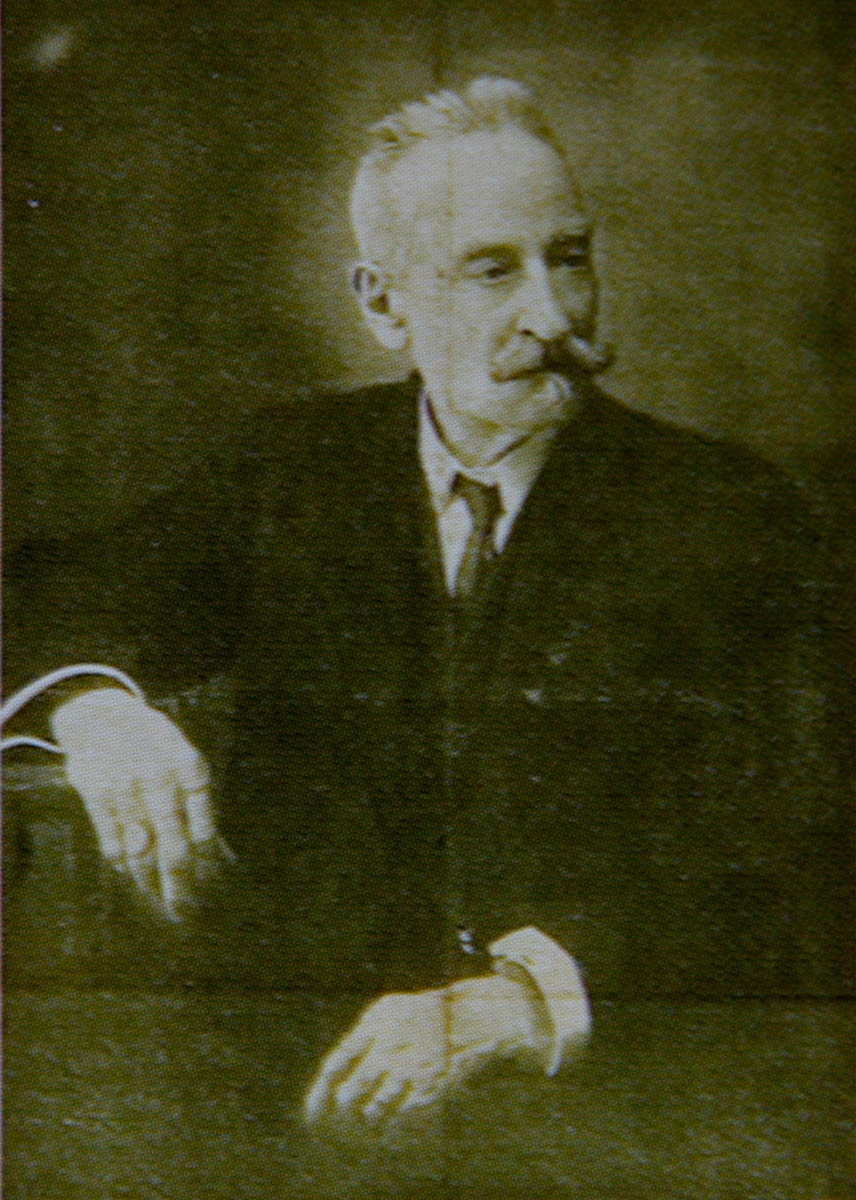
Photograph published in El Porvenir, with his obituary.

=== Living in Tangier ===
Rather than remain in Spain, his memories of Tangier led him to join a diplomatic mission on its way to meet with Sultan Hassan I in 1876. Once there, he moved into a newly built home near the medina quarter and later acquired an old theater to serve as his studio. Although he frequently travelled to exhibitions (as far afield as Saint Petersburg and New York) and spent the summers with his family in Reus, he would live in Tangier for the rest of his life.

In 1886, he married twenty-year-old Maria Manuela Valerega Cano, a Tangier native of Italian ancestry. Shortly after, a Jewish friend of Maria's died and they adopted her orphaned son.

In 1905, his career declined. He began having respiratory and cardiovascular problems due to a lung infection he had contracted in 1903, and often did not have enough energy to work. Travelling to promote his paintings also became very difficult. The situation was aggravated by a sharp decrease in the number of foreign visitors and tourists; caused by the rebellion of Bou Hmara and the Perdicaris incident. In 1907, he and his wife rented a house in Madrid in a last ditch effort to promote his work at an exhibition of the Círculo de Bellas Artes.

His health problems eventually led to his death. His executor began a collection to defray the costs of a monument in his honor, but it was never created. Initially, he was buried in Tangier but, in 1921, the government of Reus demanded that he be recognized in his home town. In 1947, his remains were moved to Reus and reinterred near his friend, Fortuny. A plaque was placed on the house where he was born. In 2013, a joint retrospective was held at the Museu d'Art i Història de Reus and the Museu Nacional d'Art de Catalunya.

== Moroccan portraits ==
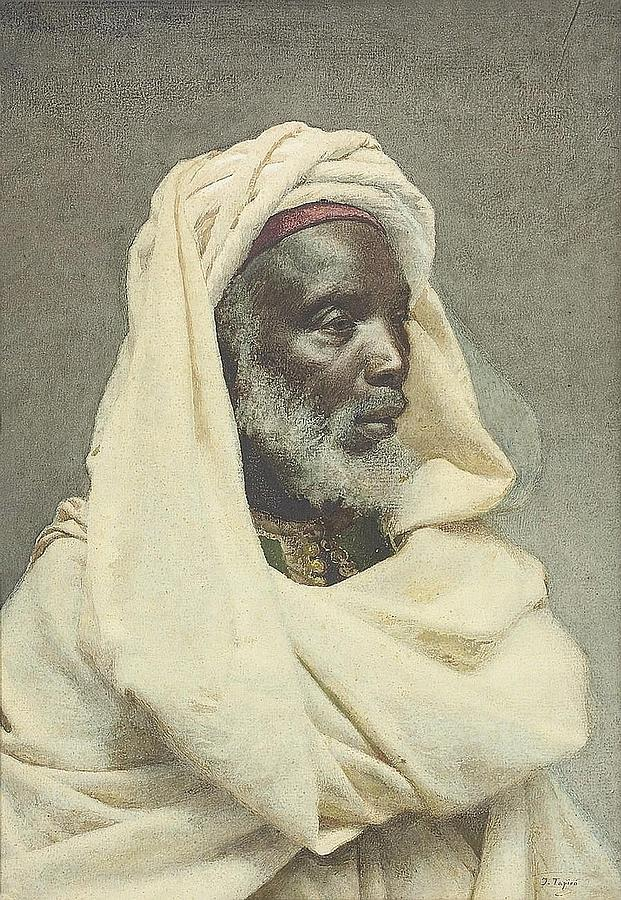
An African Man Dressed in Yellow

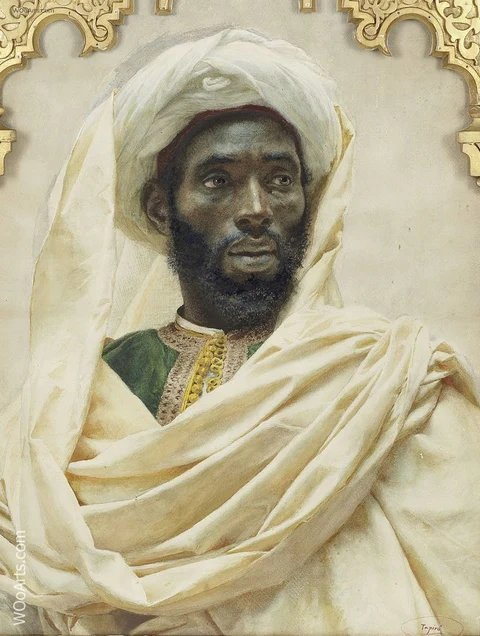
"A Moroccan Man"

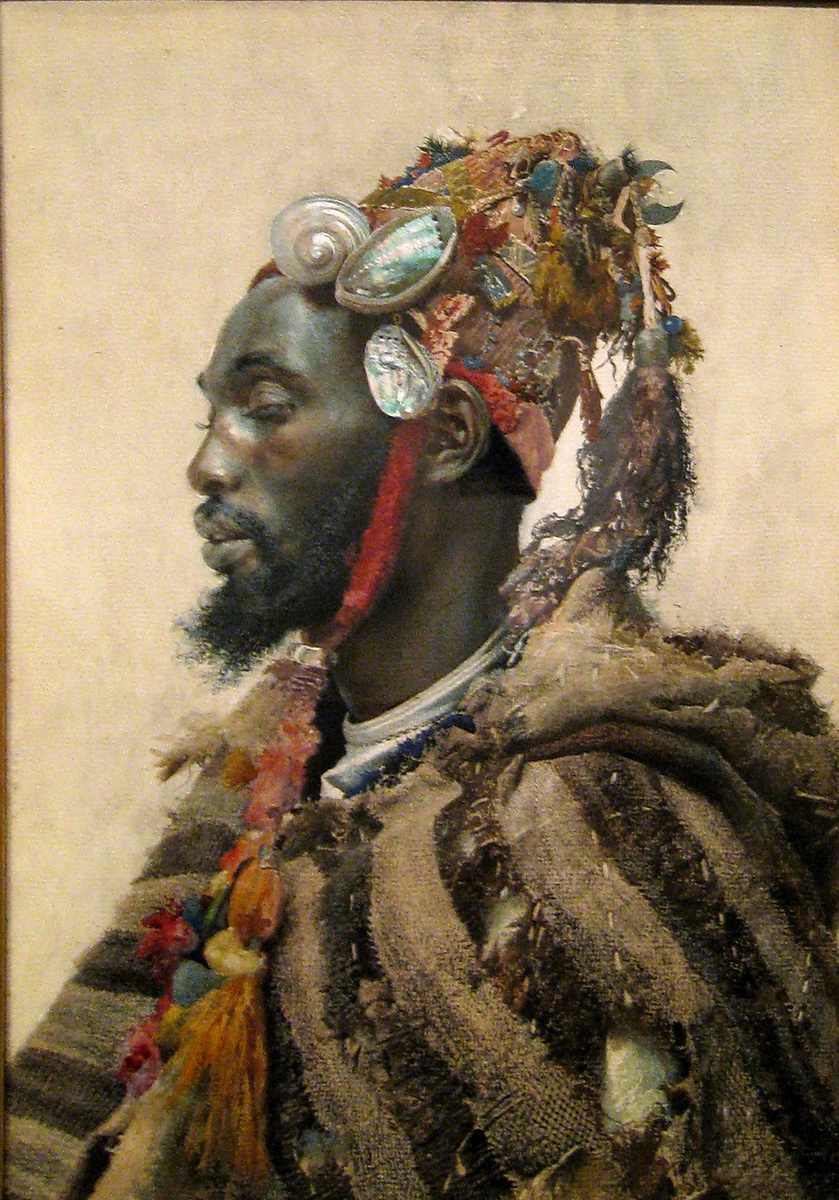
"Santon" (little saint), a type of street preacher

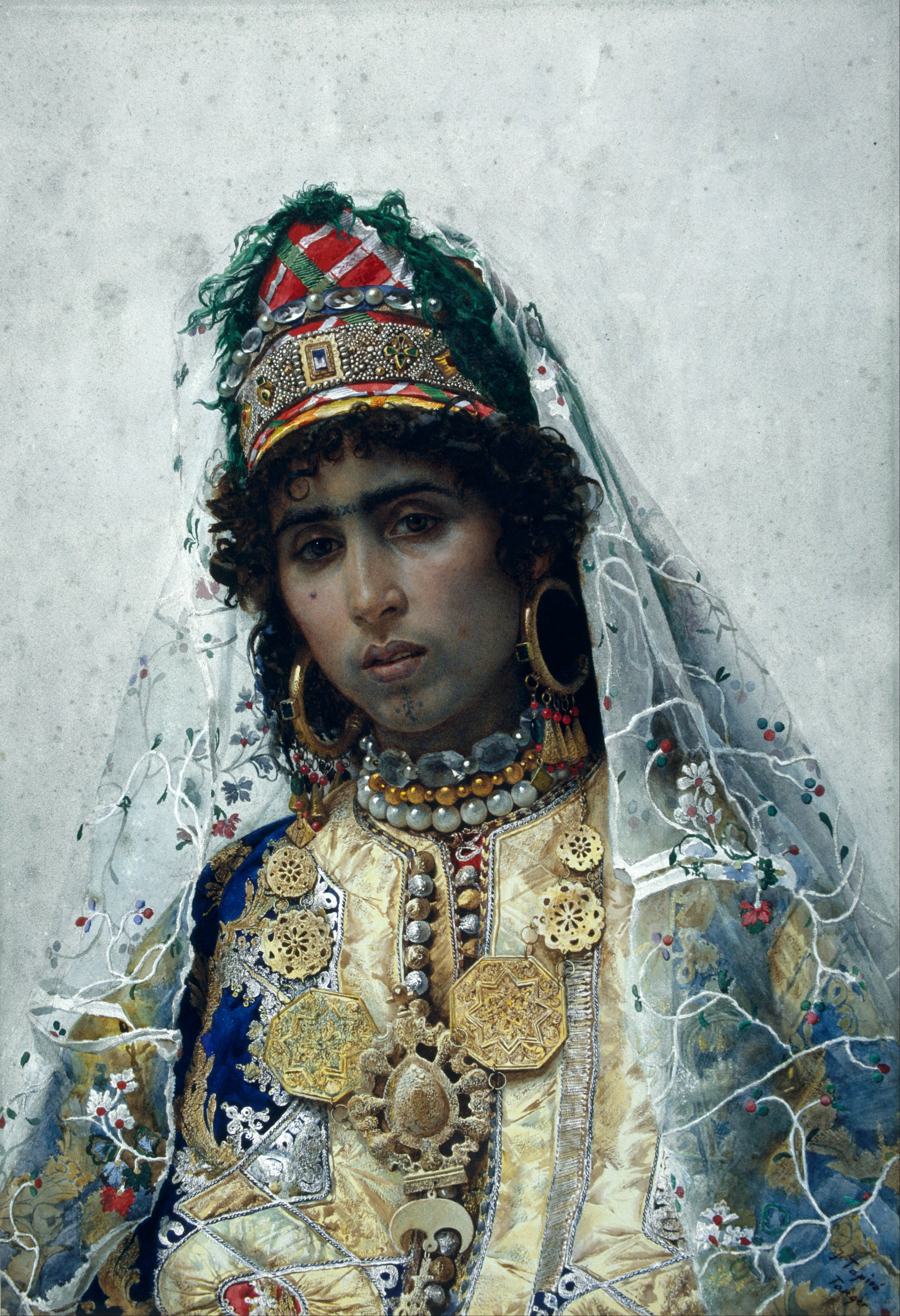
Berber Bride

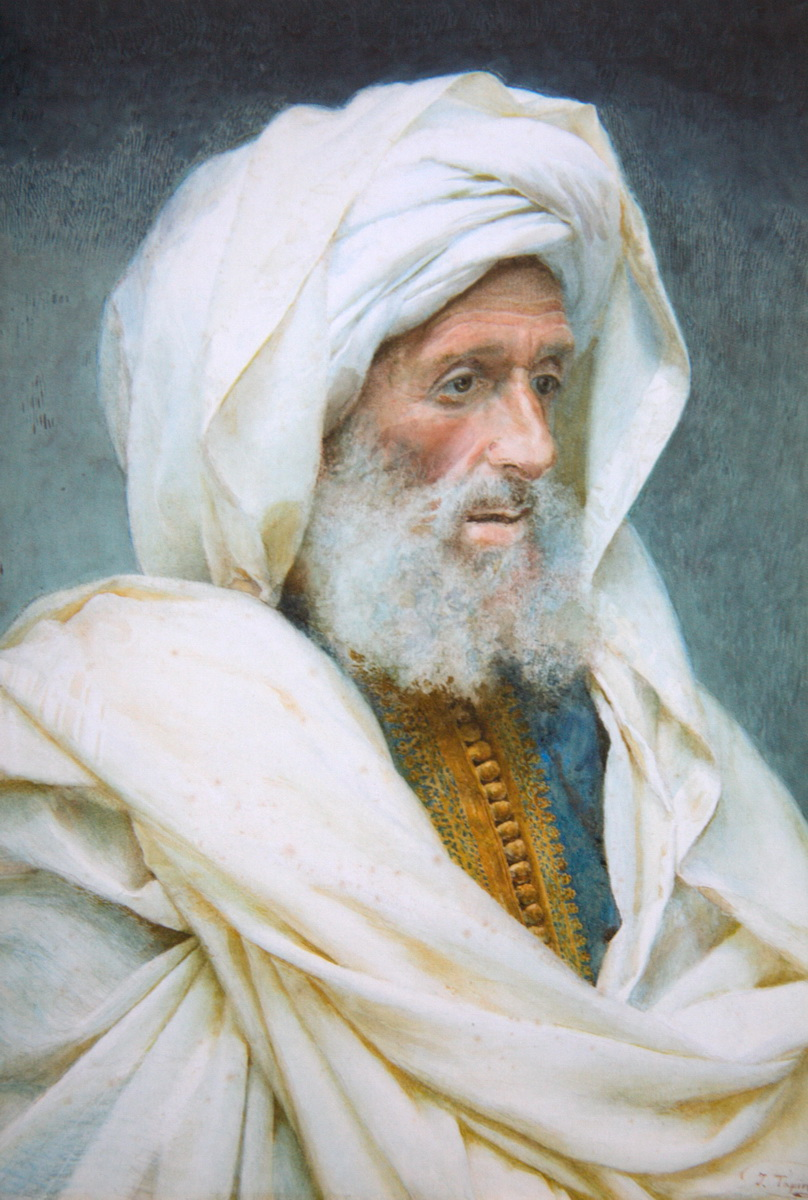
The Sharif of Ouazzane

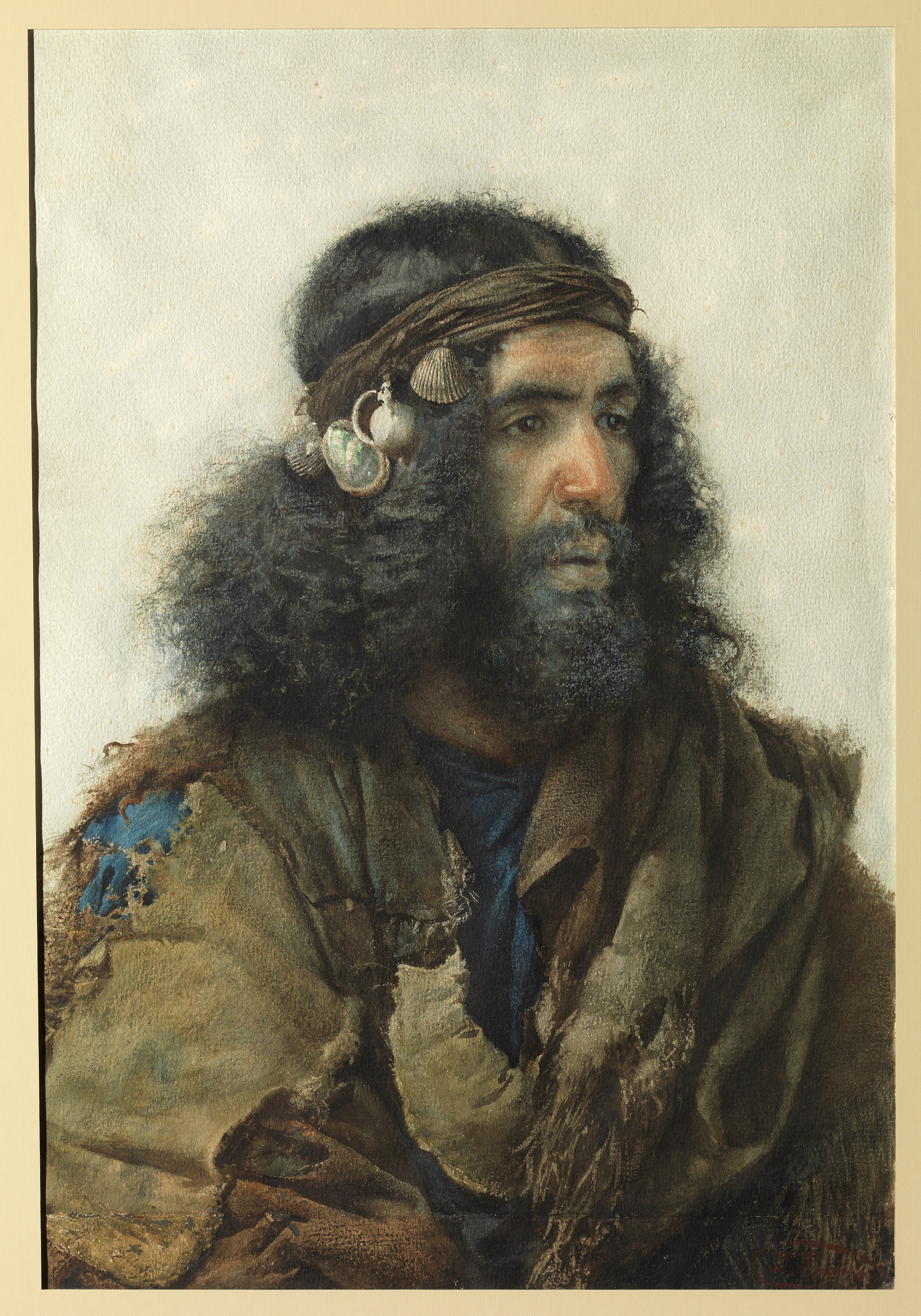
A Faqih of the
Darqawa sect

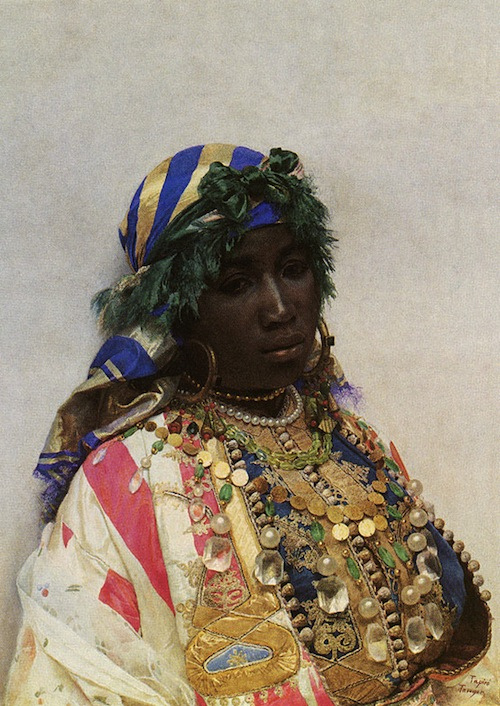
Tangerine Woman, from the collection of
Malcolm Forbes

== See also ==
- List of Orientalist artists
- Orientalism
