= Odalisque (painting) =

1885 painting by Juan Luna

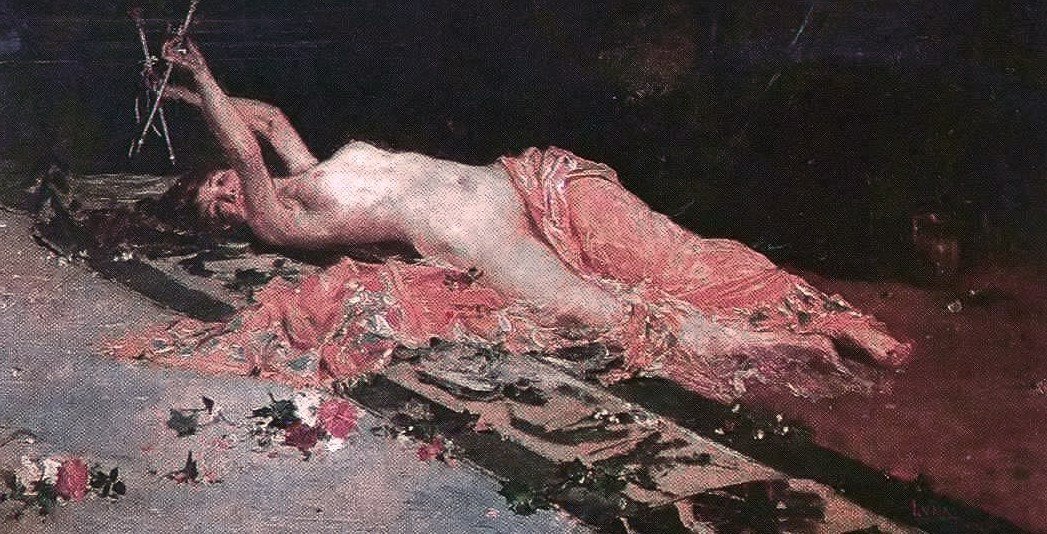
- Artist: Juan Luna
- Year: 1885
- Location: Don Luis Araneta Collection (Philippines)

The Odalisque is a famous 1885 painting by award-winning Filipino painter and revolutionary activist Juan Luna. It is one of Luna's so-called "Academic Salon portraits" that followed the standards of proper proportion and perspective, and realistic depictions with "an air of dignity and allure". Although less polished than Luna's other works of art, the Odalisque is typical of the well-planned characteristics of the artist's portraits, meaning that the portraits were painted in a personal studio while expertly studying the desired effects, and with finesse. The Odalisque is one of the paintings that made Luna an officially accepted artist at the Salon of Paris because it shows Luna's skill at draftsmanship, his "talent to draw and to draw well". The Odalisque was formerly a part of the painting collection of Philippine national hero José Rizal. It is currently a component of the Don Luis Araneta Collection in the Philippines.
