= Domènec Soberano =

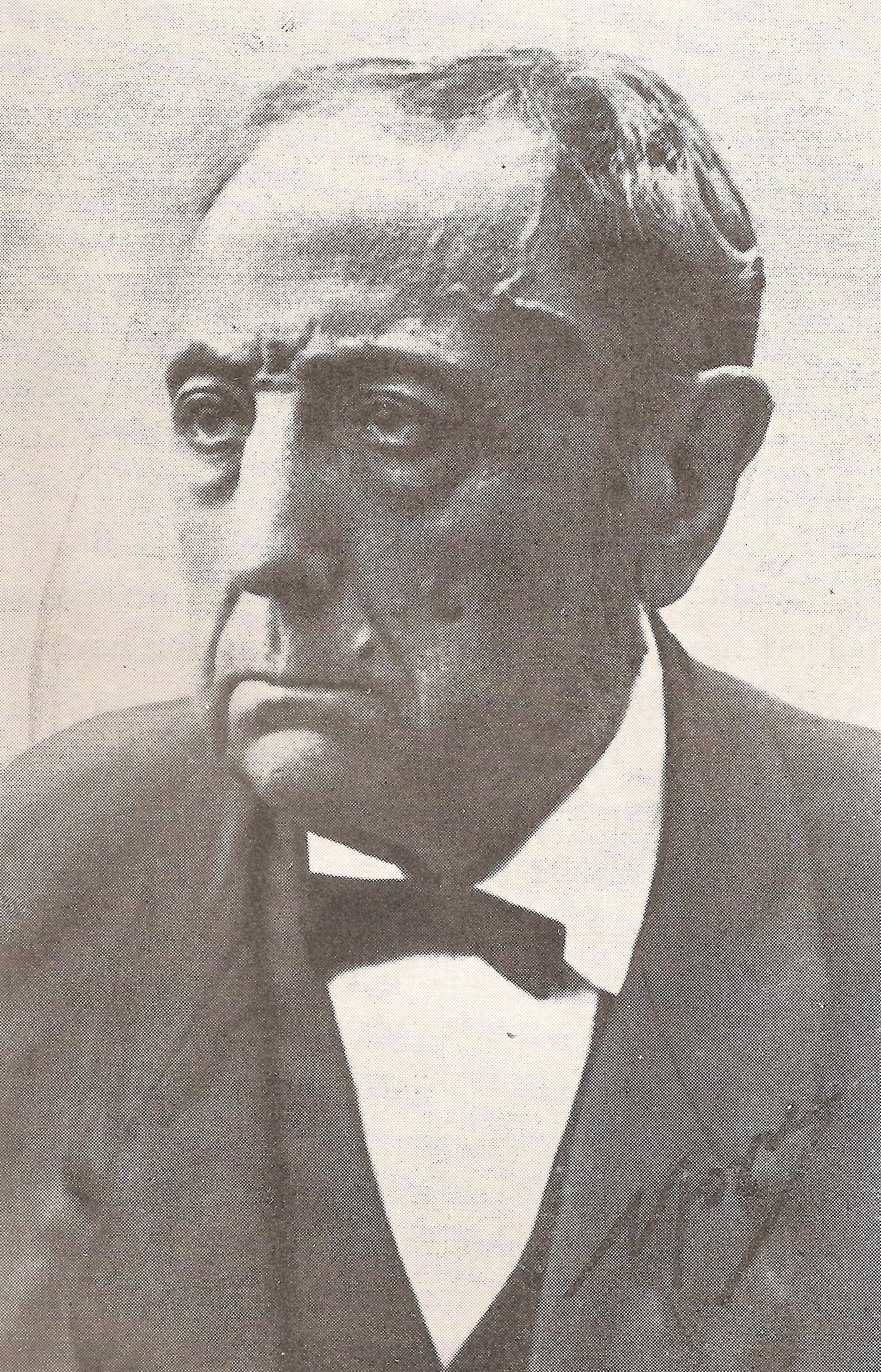
Domènec Soberano (c. 1900)

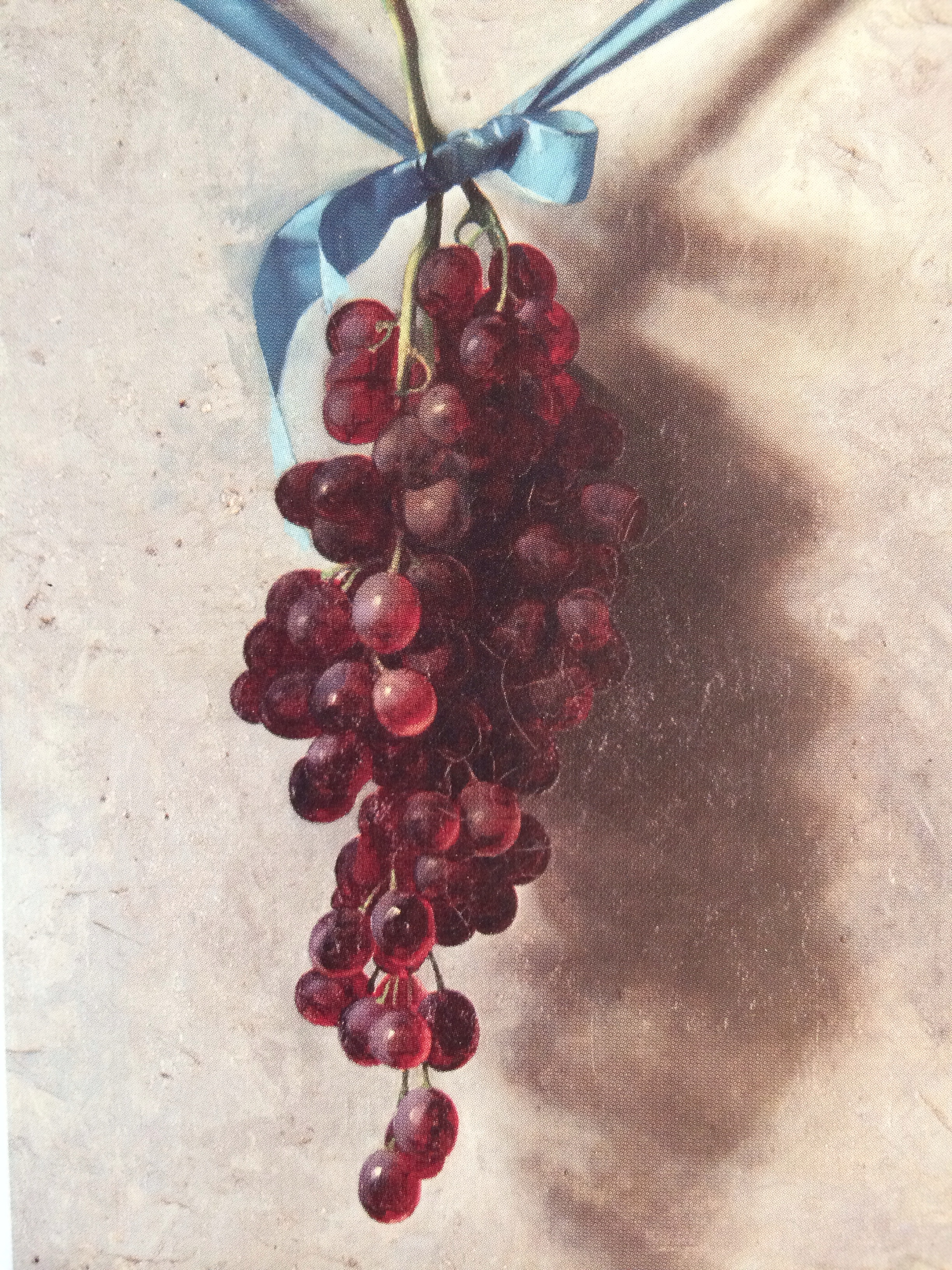
Still-life

Domènec Soberano i Mestres (1825, Reus - 1909, Reus) was a Catalan wine merchant who was also an amateur painter and art teacher.

== Biography ==
Thanks to an improvement his father invented for the process of making sparkling wine, he was able to travel throughout Europe. In 1866, he converted the family business from a wine warehouse to the production of "Champagne de Reus", under the name Soberano & Cia. In 1867, he presented his Cava wine at the Exposition Universelle in Paris.

During his trips, he developed an interest in painting techniques and discovered watercolors, which were little known in Catalonia at the time. He was largely self-taught, and always considered himself to be an amateur.

He opened a drawing school in Reus, which he operated until 1888. He was a friend of Marià Fortuny Baró and Antoni Marsal, the grandfather and uncle, respectively, of Marià Fortuny. Soberano was his first painting instructor and, seeing his great potential, recommended him to the sculptor, Domènec Talarn, who brought him to Barcelona. Fortuny was very grateful; maintaining a lifetime correspondence with Soberano and presenting him with several works.

Among his other notable students were Baldomer Galofre, Josep Tapiró Baró, Joan Roig Solé and Josep Llovera i Bufill. His son, Càstul Soberano Roca, was also a promising painter, but died young.

Few of his own paintings are very well known. Many of them are still-lifes and watercolor landscapes. His portraits were quite traditional in style. He usually did not sign his works. He also did decorative paintings at several houses in Reus.

Toward the end of his life, he devoted himself to collecting his now-famous student Fortuny's paintings and drawings.
