= The Spanish Wedding =

Painting by Marià Fortuny

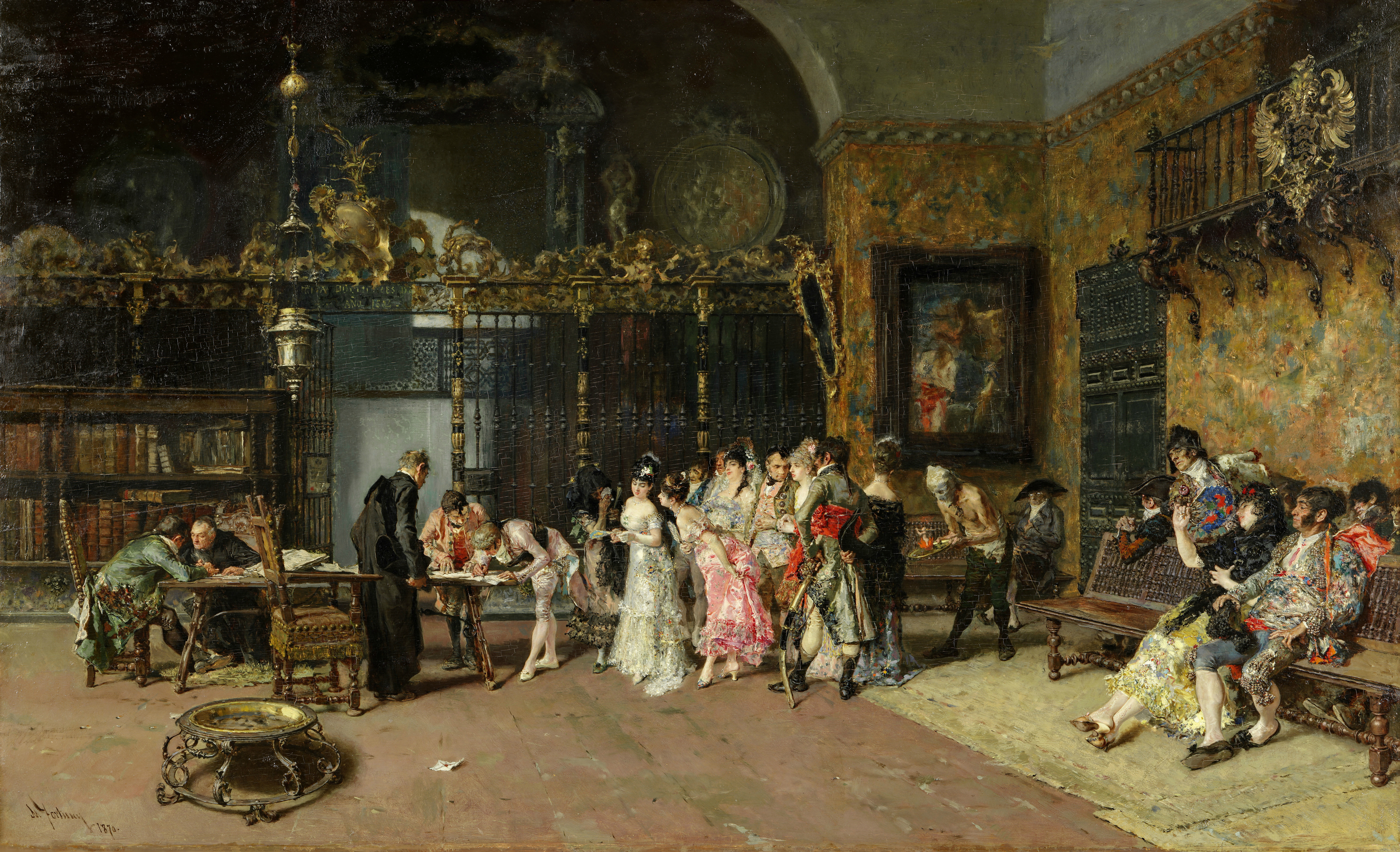
- Artist: Marià Fortuny
- Year: 1870
- Medium: Oil on panel
- Dimensions: 60 cm × 93.5 cm (24 in × 36.8 in)
- Location: Museu Nacional d'Art de Catalunya, Barcelona

The Spanish Wedding or La Vicaría (1868–1870) is a masterwork by Marià Fortuny i Marsal, also known as Marià Fortuny or Mariano Fortuny. La Vicaría exemplifies genre painting of the 19th century. The use of jewel tones, contrasts between light and dark, and the virtuosity of the work attest to Fortuny's talent. It resides at Museu Nacional d'Art de Catalunya in Barcelona, Spain.

== Marià Fortuny ==
Marià Fortuny (1838–1874), a Catalan and Spanish artist, was known during the 19th century for his oil paintings, etchings, and watercolors. Fortuny was a master artist of genre painting; these show scenes from everyday life. The subject matter can be from any social class and have historical elements. Fortuny was a prodigy, completing other master works when he was 12 years old. The Spanish Wedding was completed when he was just 32. It exemplifies the genre style in three ways. First, a wedding is a typical part of life, and was an especially important celebration in 19th century Spain and Catalonia. Second, the painting tells a story, which needs no outside information. Finally, the mixing of historical and contemporary elements is typical of genre paintings.

== History ==
Watercolor Sketch for "The Spanish Wedding"
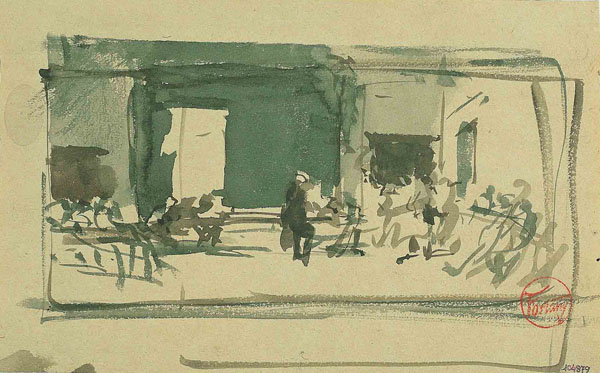
- Artist: Marià Fortuny
- Year: 1868–1870
- Type: Watercolor on paper
- Location: Museu Nacional d'Art de Catalunya

The Spanish Wedding was painted from 1868 to 1870. It was started in Rome and completed when the artist moved to Paris. Fortuny's working style is characterized by extensive research. Many test sketches and watercolors survive. These practice works show Fortuny's artistic process. Each sketch becomes more sophisticated, and refines his extensive research, prior to putting brush to canvas. Fortuny was known for using family and friends, as well as professionals, as models for his paintings. In The Spanish Wedding, his wife, Cecilia de Madrazo, and sister-in-law, Isabel de Madrazo, daughters of Federico de Madrazo, the director of the Museo del Prado, modeled for the painting, as well as the artist, Jean-Louis-Ernest Meissonier.

It is believed that The Spanish Wedding was inspired by a visit to a parish church in Madrid in preparation for his marriage to Cecilia de Madrazo. When the painting was displayed in 1870, it brought Fortuny international praise by both the general public and by the art community. Instead of being shown at the Paris Salon, the painting was exhibited at the gallery belonging to Adolph Goupil at No. 9 Rue Chaptal, Paris. Goupil was a major art dealer in the 19th century. The Spanish Wedding was quickly sold to Adèle Cassin, for 70,000 francs. This was one of the highest prices a painting had commanded to date, with Meissonier's 1814, la Campagne de France, which sold in 1866 for 85,000 francs being among the few which bested it. The Spanish Wedding catapulted Fortuny to international fame and his paintings were in high demand for the remainder of his career.

Showing "The Spanish Wedding", 1922
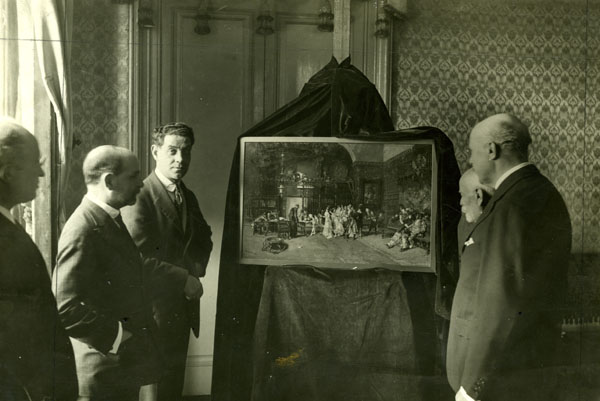
- Year: 1922
- Type: Photograph
- Location: Museu Nacional d'Art de Catalunya

The painting remained in private hands until 1922. At that time, it was purchased by the Municipal Museum of Barcelona along with the Museum Board of Barcelona. Due to a misunderstanding, it became urgent for the museum to purchase the piece. It was believed the owner was moving to America and taking the painting with him. The Barcelona government decided that it would be best for the art work to come back to Spain and the funds for this endeavor were raised by subscription. It arrived at the museum in 1922 and is now cared for and displayed by Museu Nacional d'Art de Catalunya, in Barcelona.

== Description and Art Historical Analysis ==
The Spanish Wedding is a painting of the signing of the wedding license or registry after the marriage ceremony. Weddings and church scenes were a popular subject during the 19th century. The Spanish Wedding highlights Fortuny's abilities. Central to the action are the bride and groom, surrounded by friends and family. The priest; two gentlemen at the end of the table; and the older couple, on the bench to the right, look on as the groom signs the documents, thereby creating emphasis on the center of the painting.

Fortuny's use of color and light illustrates his inspiration by the artist Goya. The contrast of the dark interior with the light colors of the wedding party contrast sharply, much like the 17th century Dutch masters that Fortuny examined as a student.

While the painting was created in 1870, the clothing, like many genre paintings, is inspired by an historical time period. In this case, Fortuny references the 18th century, in the style of the men's clothing, and the women's accessories. The women's dresses follow the silhouette of the late 19th century. Fortuny renders silk and lace with exceptional ability. The viewer can almost hear the rustle of fabrics. The painting is decidedly Spanish in inspiration with the inclusion of peinetas on the women, the enormous iron grill work, typical of Spanish churches, and bull fighters. The painting is filled with objects that, some experts say, were from Fortuny's personal collection. The metal heating element in the left corner, known as a brazier, is used in a number of his paintings, and may have been from his extensive personal collection of antiquities. This collection of antiques contributed to the research that Fortuny undertook prior to the creation of any of his paintings.

The technique, which creates warmth and depth, is called preciosismo. This technique leads to fine brush work, which, when observed closely, looks like dashes and daubs of paint. When the viewer stands back from the painting, it comes together to create a wondrous whole, that is light and airy. This use of color also shows how Goya inspired Fortuny. In Goya's Charles IV of Spain and His Family there is a similar quality of light and color. Art Historians also attribute Fortuny's inspiration to Jean-Louis-Ernest Meissonier.

Just as Fortuny, and The Spanish Wedding, were influenced by Goya and Meissonier, he also influenced other artists. His brother-in-law, Raimundo de Madr1azo, borrowed heavily from The Spanish Wedding for his genre painting Coming Out of Church. Van Gogh also was inspired by this work, as were contemporary Spanish artists. Art historians believe that had Fortuny lived longer, his work would have grown and influenced artists for many years to come. Unfortunately, due to the revolution in the arts by the French Impressionists, Fortuny, and other genre artists like him, are largely unknown.

== Exhibition history ==
| Year | Museum or Gallery | City | Title | Reference |
|---|---|---|---|---|
| 1919 | Palais des Beaux-Arts | Paris | Exposition de Peinture Espagnole Moderne sous le haut patronage de la municipalite parisienne | |
| 1940 | Palau de la Virreina | Barcelona | Exposicion Fortuny | |
| 1974 | Museu d'Art Modern | Barcelona | Primer centenario de la muerte de Fortuny | |
| 1974 | Casón del Buen Retiro | Madrid | Primer centenario de la muerte de Fortuny | |
| 1975 | Museu Comarcal de Reus | Reus | Primer centenario de la muerte de Fortuny | |
| 1983 | Centro Cultural Villa de Madrid | Madrid | Cataluna en la Espana Moderna 1714–1983 | |
| 1985–1986 | Palau Robert | Barcelona | El cami de dotze artistes catalans 1960–1980. Barcelona, Paris, New York | |
| 1987–1988 | Musée du Petit Palais | Paris | De Greco a Picasso. Cinq siècles d'art espagnol /1/ | |
| 2003–2004 | Museu Nacional d'Art de Catalunya | Barcelona | Fortuny 1838–1874 | |
| 2005–2006 | Museu Nacional d'Art de Catalunya | Barcelona | La Paraula figurada. La presència del llibre a les collecions del MNAC | |
| 2014 | Museu Nacional d'Art de Catalunya | Barcelona | Works of the Modern Art Collection | |
| 2014–present | Museu Nacional d'Art de Catalunya | Barcelona | Permanent Installation of the Modern Art Galleries | |

== Bibliography ==
- Beaumont, E. de.; Davillier, C; DuPont-Auberville, A., Atelier de Fortuny. Oeuvre poshume. Objects d'Art et de curiosite, Paris, 1875, p. 5.
- Boronat, M.J, La politica d'adquisicions de la Junta de Museus, Barcelona, 1999, pp. 532–533, 588–589 and 738–745.
- Cataleg de Pintura segles XIX i XX. Fons del Museu d'Art Modern, 2 vol., Barcelona, 1987, I, pp. 408–409, cat. num. 897, fig.
- Catalunya Grafica, Barcelona, 6/1922, 15, fig.
- Cataluna en la Espana Moderna 1714–1983, Madrid, 1983, p. 176, cat. s/num. [exhibition catalog].
- Ciervo, J., (Mariano Fortuny, Hojas Selectas, Barcelona, 2/1920, 218, p. 101.
- De Greco a Picasso. Cinc siecles d'art espagnol/1/, Paris, 1987, fig. p. 26 [exhibition catalog].
- Donate, M.; Mendoza, C.; Quilez, F., Fortuny (1838–1874), Barcelona, 2003, p. 218–224, fig. p. [221], 225, cat. num. 76 [exhibition catalog].
- El cami de dotze artistes catalans 1960–1980. Barcelona, Paris, New York, Barcelona, 1985, p. 16, fig. 4 [exhibition catalog].
- Exposicion Fortuny. Catalogo, Barcelona, 1940, p. 67, cat. num. 223 [exhibition catalog].
- Exposition de Peinture Espagnole Moderne sous le haut patronage de la municipalite parisienne, Paris, 1919, p. 13, cat. num. 101 [exhibition catalog].
- Falgueres, L., (El nou Museu de l'Art Modern a Barcelona), D'Aci i D'Alla, Barcelona, 12/1924, XIV, 84, fig. p. 223 (detail).
- Folch, LL., El pinto Fortuny, home d'ofici, Barcelona, 7/1919, III, 7, fig. p. 604.
- Folch i Torres, J., Fortuny, Reus, 1962, num. 28, pp. 142–145, 151–153 and 167–170.
- Fonbona, F., Del Neoclassicisme a la Restauracio 1808–1888, Barcelona, 1983, p. 198, fig. 198-199 (Historia de l'Art Catala, VI).
- Fortuny i Madrazo, M., Fortuny 1838–1874, Bologna, 1933, fig. 21, 22 and 23.
- Goupil, Fortuny, Paris, 1875, fig. XXVII.
- Guasch, F.; Batlle, E., Catalogo del Museo de Arte Contemporaneo, Barcelona, 1926, p. 107, cat. num. 10.
- Guia del Museu Nacional d'Art de Catalunya, Barcelona, 2004, pp. 228–229, fig.
- Hempel Lipschutz, I., (Legendaire Espagne: myth depeint mythe danse d'un tableau de Mariano Fortuny au dernier Ballet de Theophile Gautier), Theophile Gautier en sons temps. Butlletin de la Societe
- (Homenaje a Mariano Fortuny), Mercurio. Revista comercial Ibero-Americana, Barcelona, 3 June 1920, 360, fig. p. 142.
- Jardi, E., Cataluna, Madrid, 1978, fig. p. 147, (Tierras de Espana, II).
- Jardi, E., Cincuenta anos de luz gas. Barcelona en la segunda mitad del siglo XIX, Barcelona, 1978, fig. p. 128.
- La Paraula figurada. La presencia del llibre a les colleccions del MNAC, Barcelona, 2005, p. 125, cat num. 66 [exhibition catalog].
- (La Vicaría de Fortuny), La Publicidad, Barcelona, 16 May 1922 (edicion mati), 15326.
- Mestres, A., La Vicaría de Fortuny. Notas historicas, Barcelona, [1927]
- Miquel y Badia, F., Fortuny su vida y obras. Estudio biografico-critico, Barcelona, 1887, pp. 39–40 and 45.
- Miquel i Badia, F., El Arte en España. Pintura i Esculturas modernas, Barcelona, s/a., pp. 315–317.
- Museu Nacional d'Art de Catalunya. Mnac & SCALA GROUP S.p.A., 2009. ISBN 978-84-8043-198-9.
- (Nostres grabats), La Ilustracio Catalana, Barcelona, 30 November 1880, 15, p. 114.
- (Novas), La Gramalla, Barcelona, 11 June 1870, 5, p. 4.
- Primer Centenario de la Muerte de Fortuny, Madrid, 1974, s/p., cat. num. 815 [exhibition catalog].
- Riquer, B. de., (Burgesos, politics i cacics a la Catalunya de la Restauracio), L'Avenc, Barcelona, 9/1985, 85, fig. p. 17.
- Rossello, V., Fortuny. Apuntes Biograficos, Barcelona, 1874, p. 12.
- Sampere i Miquel, Sl, Mariano Fortuny. Album, Barcelona, 1880, pp. 52–54, 55 and 60–65, cat. num. 65.
- Theophile Gautier, 1993, II, 15, p.446-480.
- Valles, E., (De l'Assemblea de parlamenaris al 14 d'abril de 1931), Historia Grafica de la Catalunya contemporanea 1888–1931, Barcelona, 1976, III, fig. p. 347.
- Yxart, J., Fortuny ensayo biografico-critico, Barcelona, 1882, pp. 94–97.
