= The Odalisque (painting) =

Painting by Mariano Fortuny

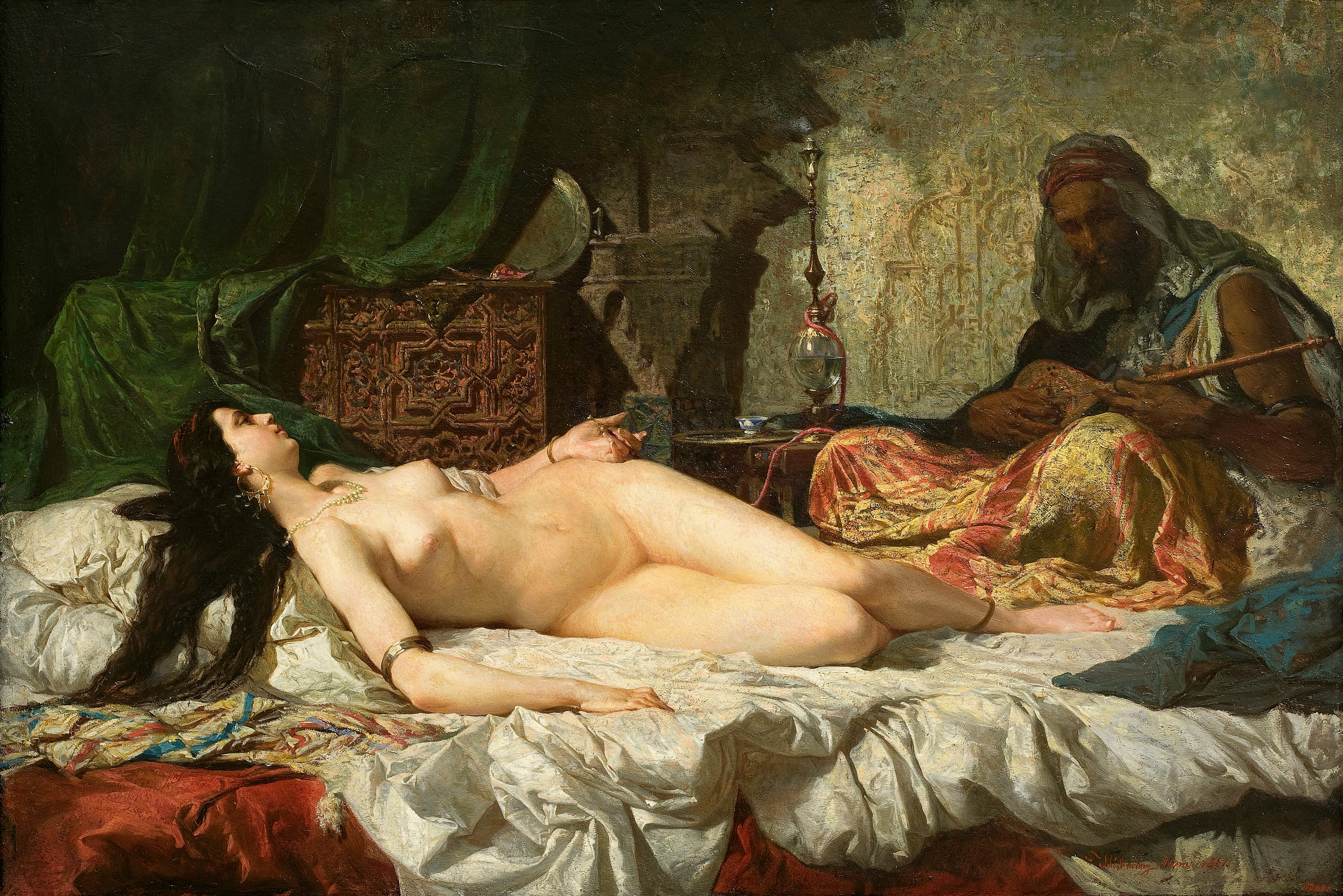
- Artist: Mariano Fortuny
- Year: 1861
- Type: Oil on cardboard
- Dimensions: 56.9 cm × 81 cm (22.4 in × 32 in)
- Location: Museu Nacional d'Art de Catalunya, Barcelona

The Odalisque is an 1861 oil painting made by Spanish painter Mariano Fortuny in Rome. It is currently on display at the National Art Museum of Catalonia in Barcelona.

The painting portrays a nude odalisque (or concubine) reclining before a Turkish man holding what appears to be a baglama.
