= Odalisque =

Female slave or concubine in an Ottoman seraglio

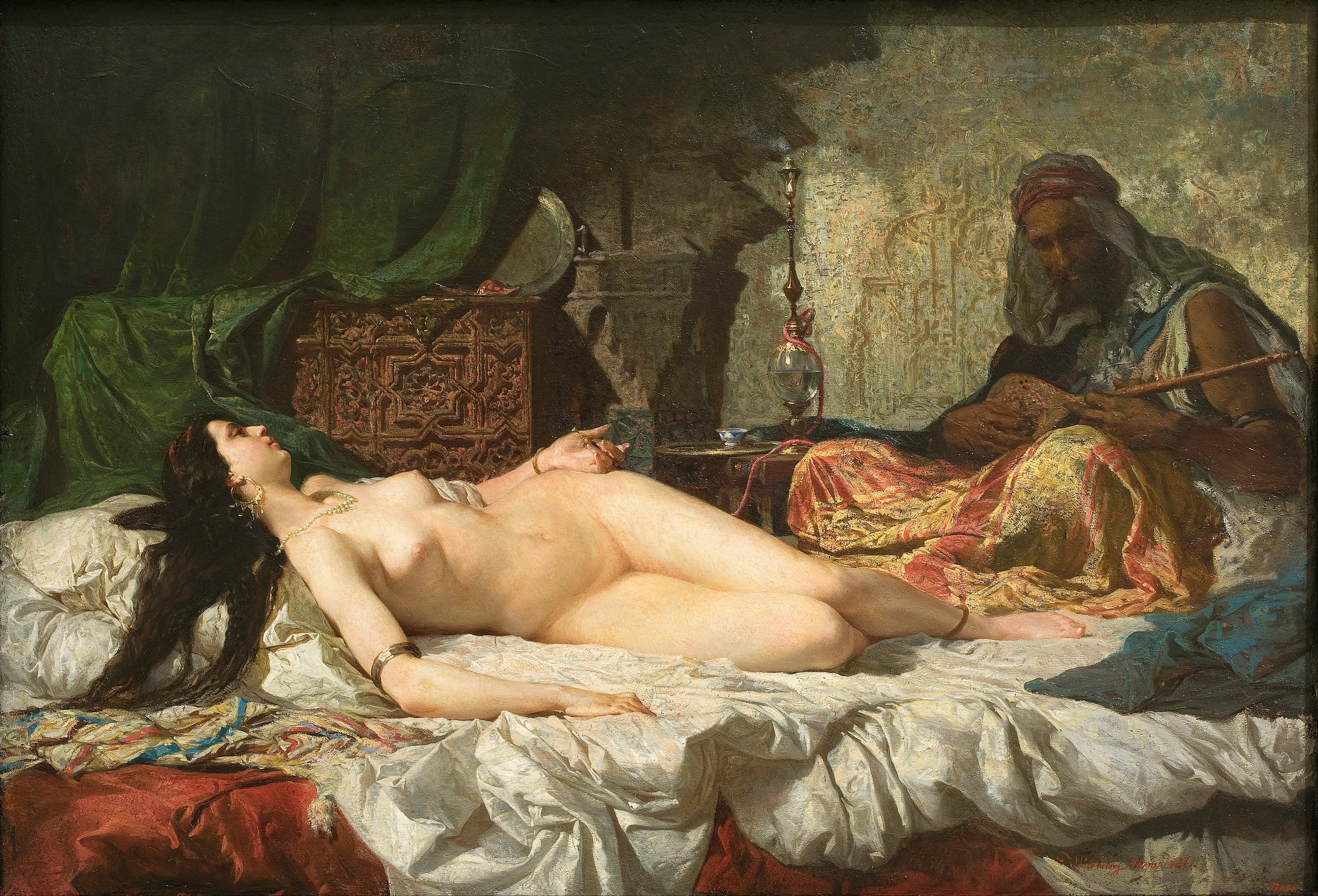
Marià Fortuny's The Odalisque (1861)

An odalisque (Ottoman Turkish: اوطه‌لق, Turkish: odalık) was an enslaved chambermaid or a female house slave attendant in a Turkish seraglio, particularly the court ladies in the household of the Ottoman sultan. In western European usage, the term came to mean the harem concubine, and refers to the eroticized artistic genre in which a woman is represented mostly or completely nude in a reclining position, often in the setting of a harem. It was part of a fascination with Orientalism, particularly in Great Britain and France.

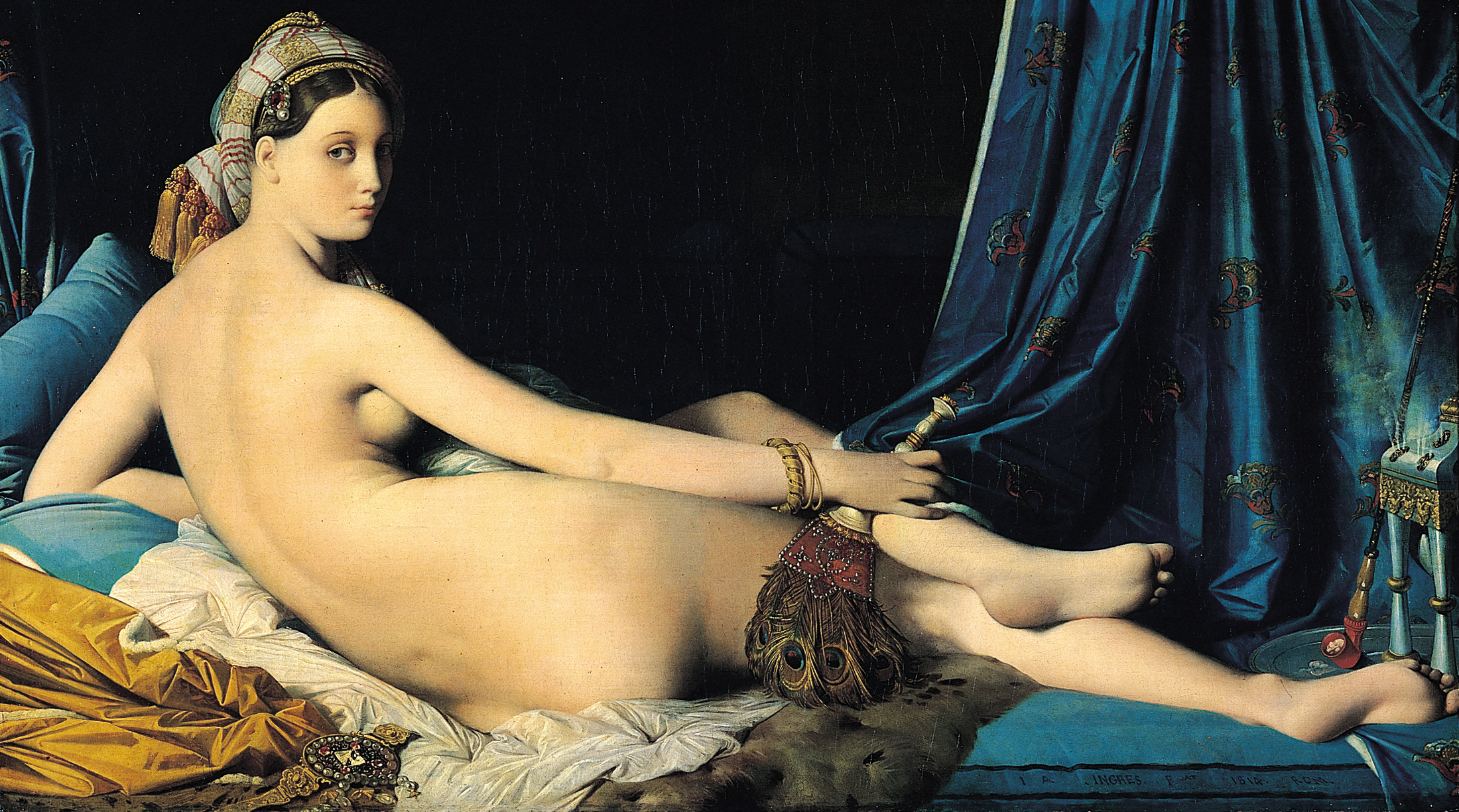
Jean Auguste Dominique Ingres, Grande Odalisque (1814)

== Etymology ==
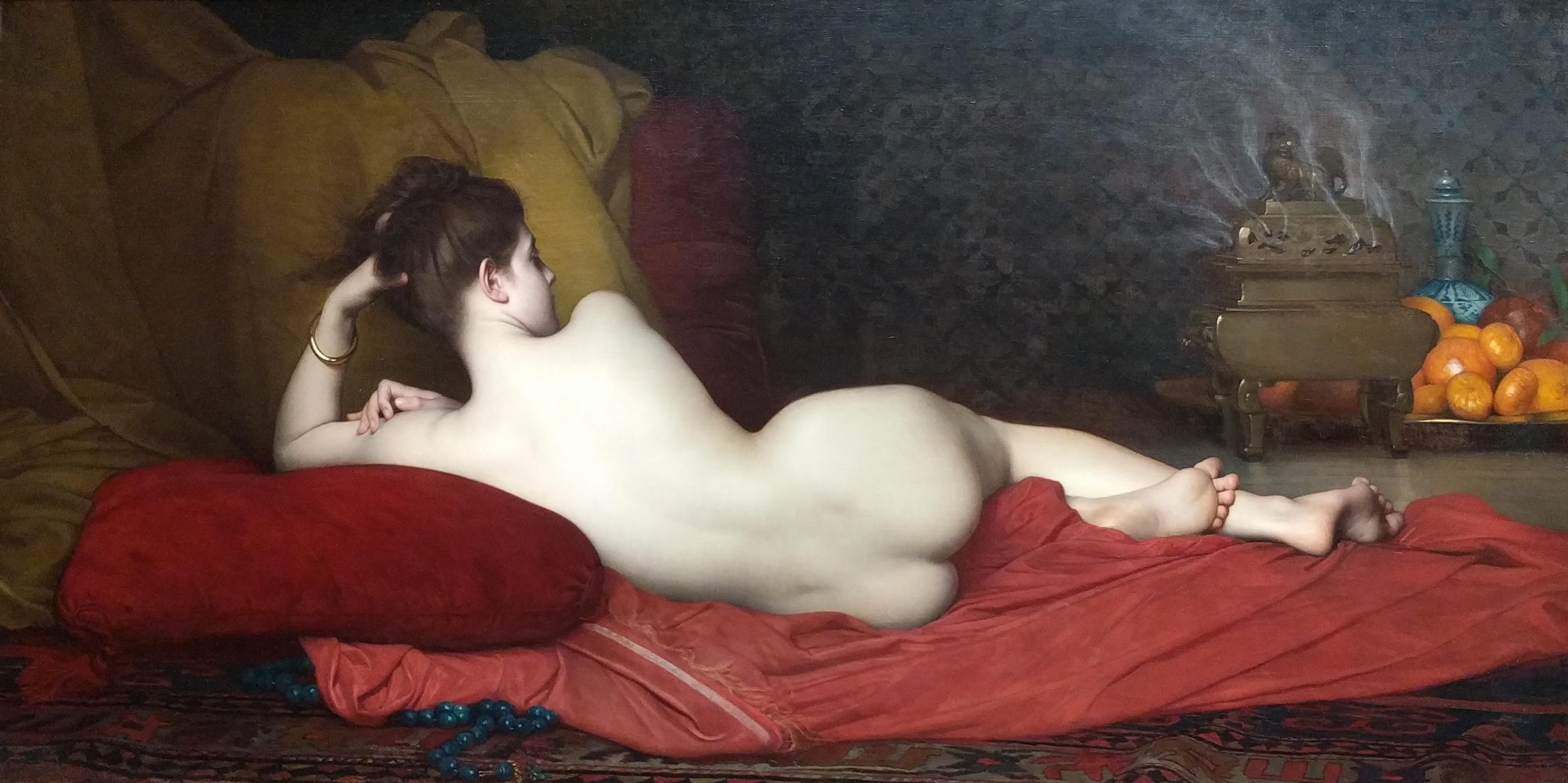
Odalisque painted by Jules Joseph Lefebvre (1874)

The word "odalisque" is French in form and originates from the Turkish odalık, meaning "chambermaid", from oda, "chamber" or "room". It can also be transliterated odahlic, odalisk, and odaliq.

Joan DelPlato has described the term's shift in meaning from Turkish to English and French:

The English and French term odalisque (rarely odalique) derives from the Turkish 'oda', meaning "chamber"; thus an odalisque originally meant a chamber girl or attendant. In western usage, the term has come to refer specifically to the harem concubine. By the eighteenth century the term odalisque referred to the eroticized artistic genre in which a nominally eastern woman lies on her side on display for the spectator.

— Joan DelPlato

== Origin as the Turkish odalık ==
An odalik was a (slave) maid who tended to the harem, but she could eventually become a (slave) concubine. She was ranked at the bottom of the social stratification of a harem, serving not the man of the household, but rather his concubines and wives as their personal chambermaid. Odalıklar were usually slaves given as gifts to the sultan by wealthy Turkish men. Generally, an odalık was never seen by the sultan, but instead remained under the direct supervision of his mother, the Valide sultan.

If an odalık was of extraordinary beauty or had exceptional talents in dancing or singing, she would be trained as a possible concubine. If selected, an odalık trained as a court lady would serve the sultan sexually. Only after such sexual contact could her status change, becoming thenceforth one of the consorts of the sultan.

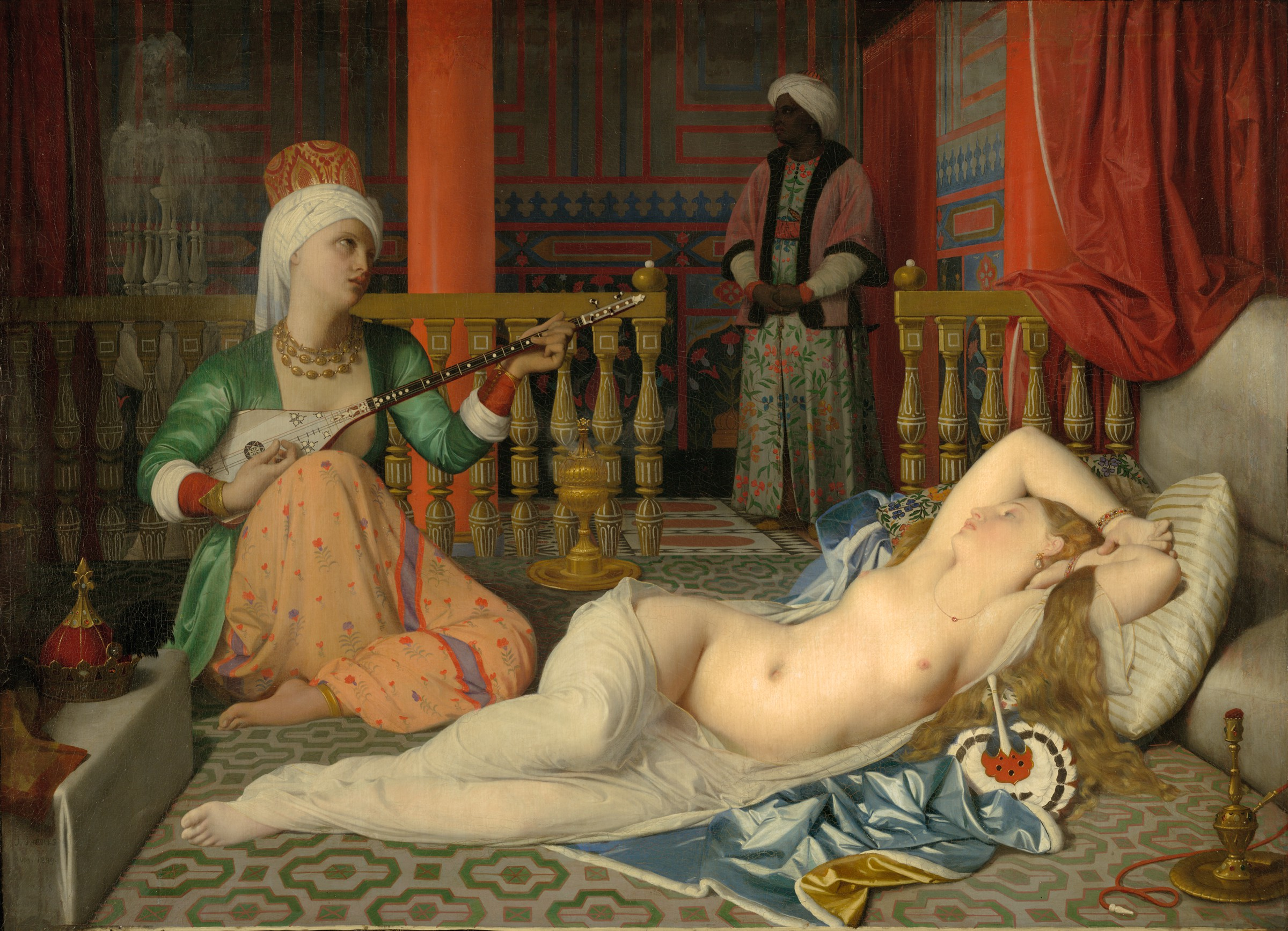
Jean Auguste Dominique Ingres, Odalisque with Slave (1839)

== Later Western usage of the term ==
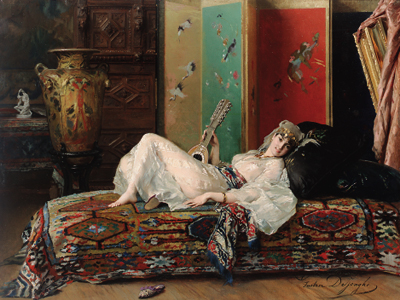
A Reclining Odalisque, painted by Gustave Léonard de Jonghe, c. 1870

During the nineteenth century, odalisques became common figures in the artistic movement known as Orientalism, being featured in many erotic paintings from that era.

W. S. Gilbert refers to the "Grace of an odalisque on a divan" in Colonel Calverley's song "If You Want a Receipt for That Popular Mystery" from the 1881 Gilbert and Sullivan opera Patience.

By the later nineteenth century, Turkish writers such as Melek Hanum used the word odalisque to refer to slave-concubines when writing in English:

If any lady possesses a pretty-looking slave, the fact soon gets known. The gentlemen who wish to buy an odalisque or a wife, make their offers. Many Turks, indeed, prefer to take a slave as a wife, as, in such case, there is no need to dread fathers, mothers, or brothers-in-law, and other undesirable relations.

The word odalisque may also refer to a mistress, concubine or paramour of a wealthy man.

In 2011, the Law Society of British Columbia brought a disciplinary hearing against an unnamed lawyer for referring to another lawyer's client as living with an odalisque. The Law Society found that the word's use, though an extremely poor choice, did not rise to the level of professional misconduct: "[28] … A lawyer, more than anyone, should be aware of the importance of using words carefully, alive to their nuances. Whether his failure to do so is the product of naïveté, as suggested by his counsel, stupidity or lack of care, it is at least unintelligent and certainly inexcusable."

== See also ==
- Ottoman Imperial Harem
- Culture of the Ottoman Empire
- Hammam
- Islamic views on slavery
- Köçek
- Ottoman Turkish language

== Sources ==
- Jeffrey Eugenides (2013) Middlesex; pg 495 "... Stretched across the couch, a Pisceasn Odalisque..."
- The Imperial Harem by Leslie Pierce
- The Nature of the Early Ottoman State by Heath W. Lowry
