= Mariano Fortuny (painter) =

Spanish painter (1838–1874)

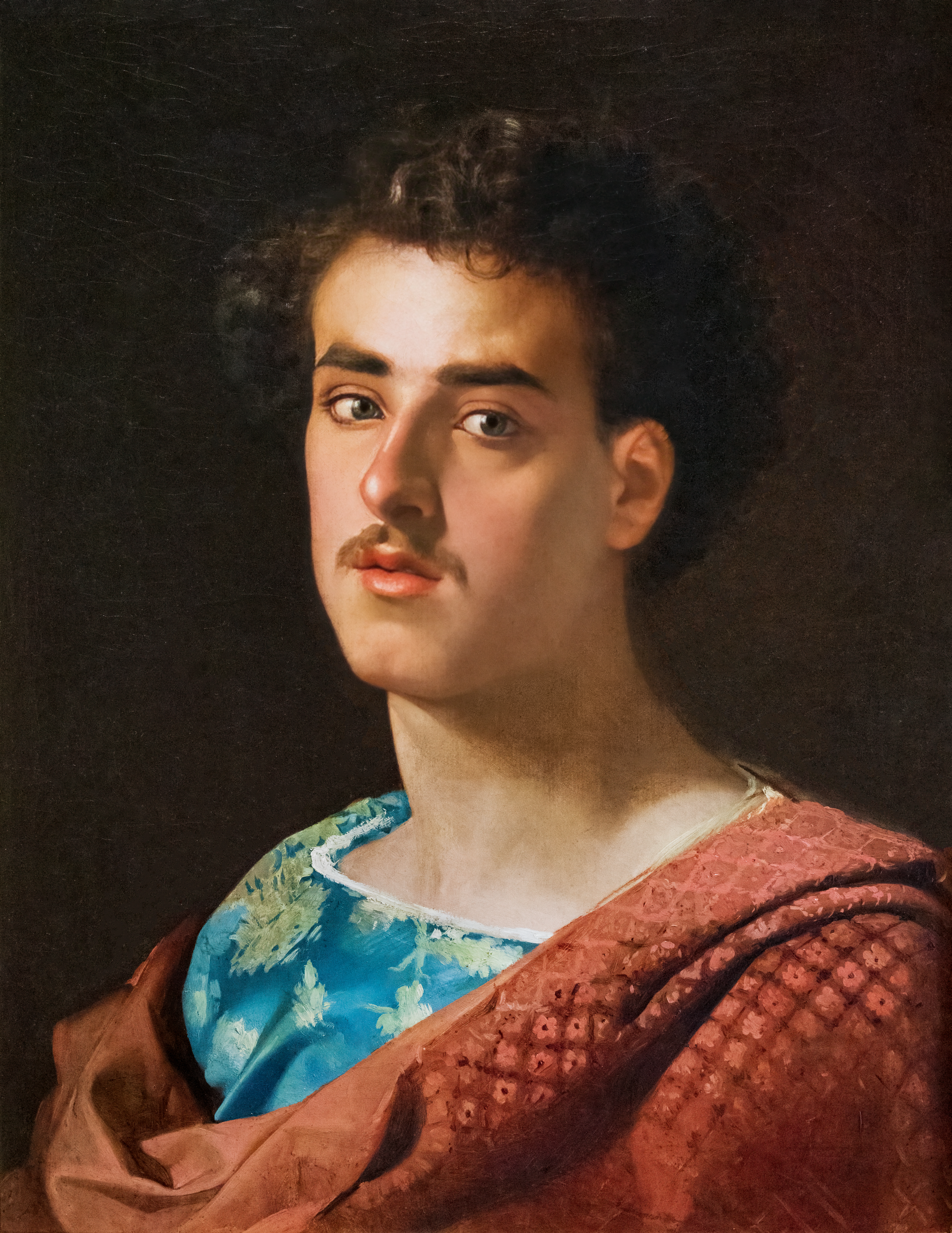
- Self portrait by Mariano Fortuny (1863–73)
- Born: Mariano Fortuny y Marsal; June 11, 1838; Reus, Catalonia, Spain
- Died: November 21, 1874 (aged 36); Rome
- Education: Academy of Barcelona (La Llotja school of art); Academia Gigi, Rome
- Known for: Painting
- Movement: Romanticism; Orientalist
- Spouse: Cecelia de Madrazo y Garreta

Mariano Fortuny y Marsal (Catalan: Marià Fortuny i Marsal, pronounced [məɾiˈa fuɾˈtuɲ i məɾ'sal]; June 11, 1838 – November 21, 1874) was a Spanish painter known for works focusing on Romantic fascination with Orientalist themes, historicist genre painting, and military painting of Spanish imperial expansion.

== Biography ==
Mariano Fortuny was born in Reus, near Tarragona, Catalonia. His father died when he was an infant, and his mother by the time he was 12. Thus, Mariano was raised by his grandfather, a cabinet-maker who taught him to make wax figurines. At the age of 9, at a public competition in his town, a local painter, teacher and patron, Domènec Soberano, encouraged him to pursue further study. At the age of 14 he moved to Barcelona with his grandfather.

The sculptor Domènec Talarn secured him a pension allowing him to attend the Escola Provincial de Belles Arts (the Escola de la Llotja). There he studied for four years under Claudi Lorenzale and Pau Milà i Fontanals, and in March 1857 he gained a scholarship that entitled him to two years of studies in Rome starting in 1858. There he studied drawing and grand manner styles, together with Josep Armet i Portanell and Ricardo de Madrazo, at the Academia Gigi.

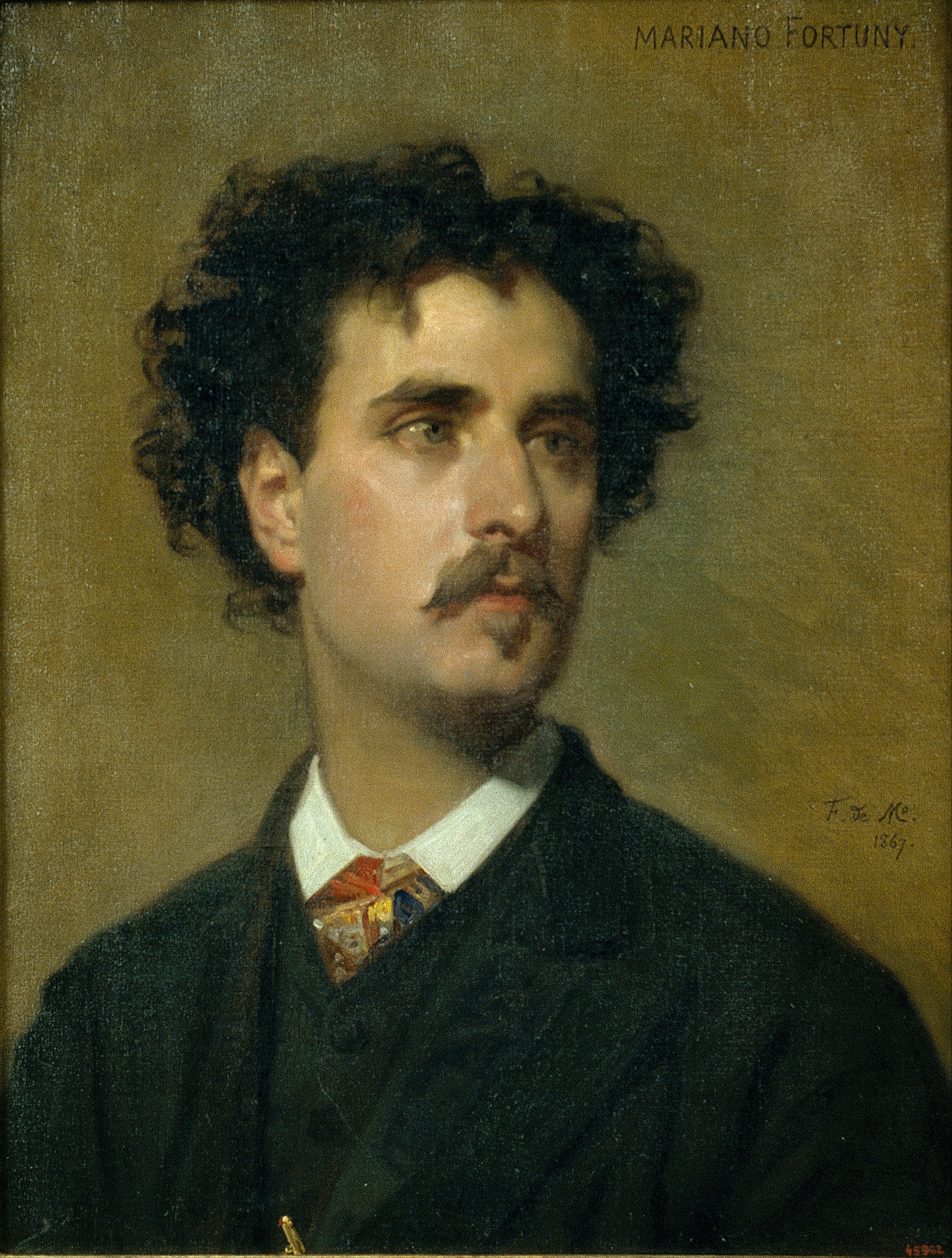
Fortuny in 1867, by Federico de Madrazo

In 1859, he was called by the Government of the province of Barcelona (Diputació de Barcelona) to depict the campaigns of the Spanish-Moroccan War. He went to Morocco from February to April of that year, making sketches of landscapes and battles, which he showed in Madrid and Barcelona when he returned. These would later serve him as preliminary sketches for his monumental piece, The Battle of Tetuan (La batalla de Tetuan, 1862–64, Museu Nacional d'Art de Catalunya).

In 1870, the artist and his family moved to Granada. Originally, this was to be a stage in an extended tourist trip that had taken the group to different localities in Andalusia. However, after arriving in Granada, Fortuny felt compelled to settle down there and work. They arrived in the Summer of 1870 and remained until the autumn of 1872 – a stay of some two and a half years. According to several of his biographers, Fortuny established an atelier, known as Estudio de los Mártires, in Granada. The exact location of this studio has remained a mystery.

However, recent scholarship has revealed that the location was a house known as Casa de Buena Vista, situated in the neighborhood of the Realejo, at the modern entrance of the Matamoros alley, between the current esplanade of the Alhambra Palace hotel and the Cross of the Martyrs.

Since the days of Velázquez, there had been a tradition in Spain (and throughout Europe) of memorializing battles and victories in paint. On the basis of his experiences, Fortuny was commissioned by the Council of the province of Barcelona (Diputació de Barcelona) to paint a large canvas diorama of the capture of the camps of Muley-el-Abbas and Muley-el-Hamed by the Spanish army. He began his composition of The battle of Tetuan on a canvas 15 metres long; but, though he worked on it off and on during the next decade, it was never finished.

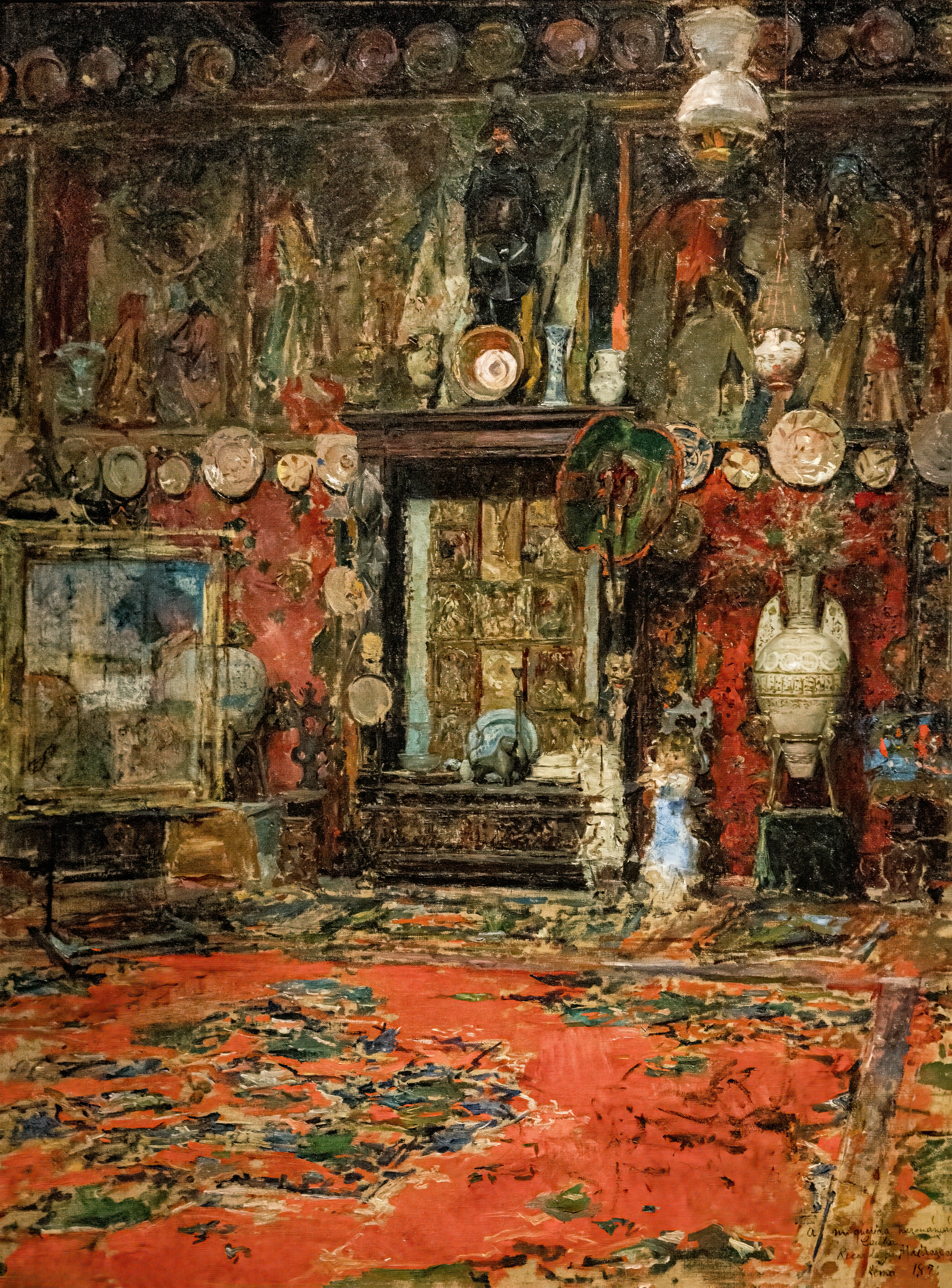
Mariano Fortuny's Studio, a painting by his friend and brother-in-law, Ricardo de Madrazo

The greater influence of this travel on Fortuny was his subsequent fascination with the exotic themes of the world of Morocco, painting both individuals and imagined court scenes. He visited Paris in 1868 and shortly afterwards married Cecilia de Madrazo, the daughter of Federico de Madrazo, who would become curator of the Prado Museum in Madrid. Cecilia was a sister of Fortuny's friend, the Orientalist artist, Ricardo de Madrazo, who had previously accompanied Fortuny on travels through Europe.

Fortuny and Cecilia had a son, Mariano Fortuny y Madrazo, who became a well-known fashion and tapestry designer. Another visit to Paris in 1870 was followed by a two years' stay at Granada, but then he returned to Rome, where he died somewhat suddenly on November 21, 1874, from an attack of tertian ague, or malaria, contracted while painting in the open air at Naples and Portici in the summer of 1874.

After Fortuny's death, his brother-in-law, Ricardo de Madrazo, took care of his studio; cataloguing his works and arranging for an auction at the Hôtel Drouot.

== Legacy ==
Fortuny paintings are colorful, with a vivacious iridescent brushstroke that at times recalls the softness of Rococo painting but also anticipates impressionist brushwork.

Fortuny often painted scenes where contemporary life had still not shaken off the epaulets and decorations of ancient traditions such as the Burial of a matador and couples signing marriage contracts (La Vicaria). Each has the dazzle of bric-a-brac ornamentation, but as in his painting of the Judgement of the Model, that painterly decorative air of Rococo and Romanticism was fading into academicism and left to confront the naked reality of the represented object. He inherited Goya's eye for the paradox of ceremony and reality.

== Gallery ==
=== Paintings ===
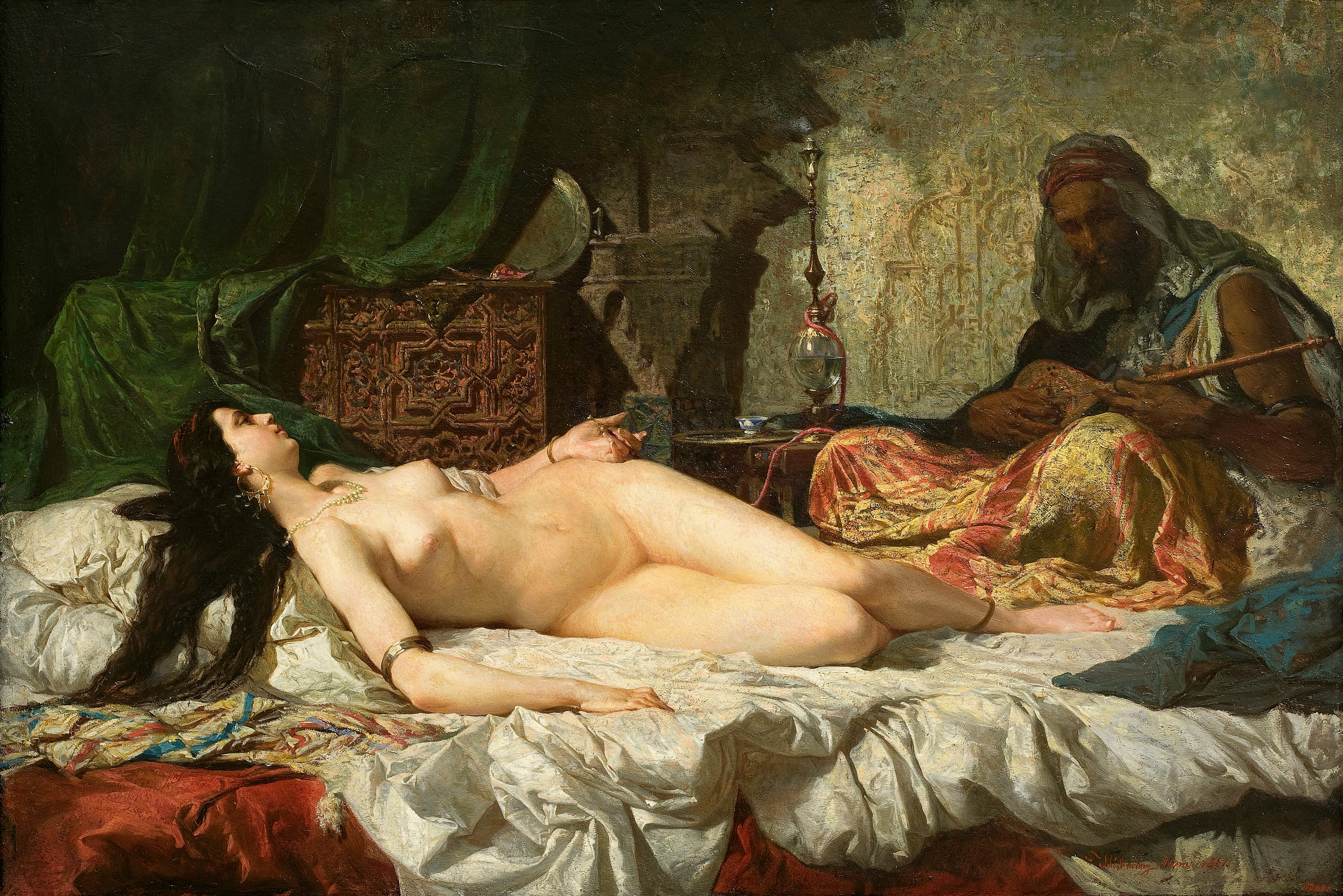
The Odalisque, 1861

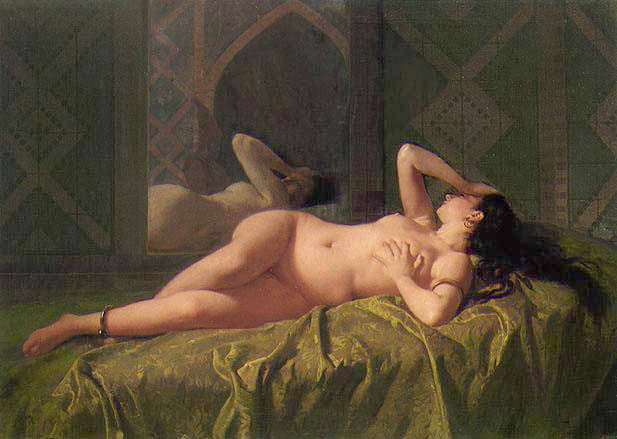
Odalisque, 1862

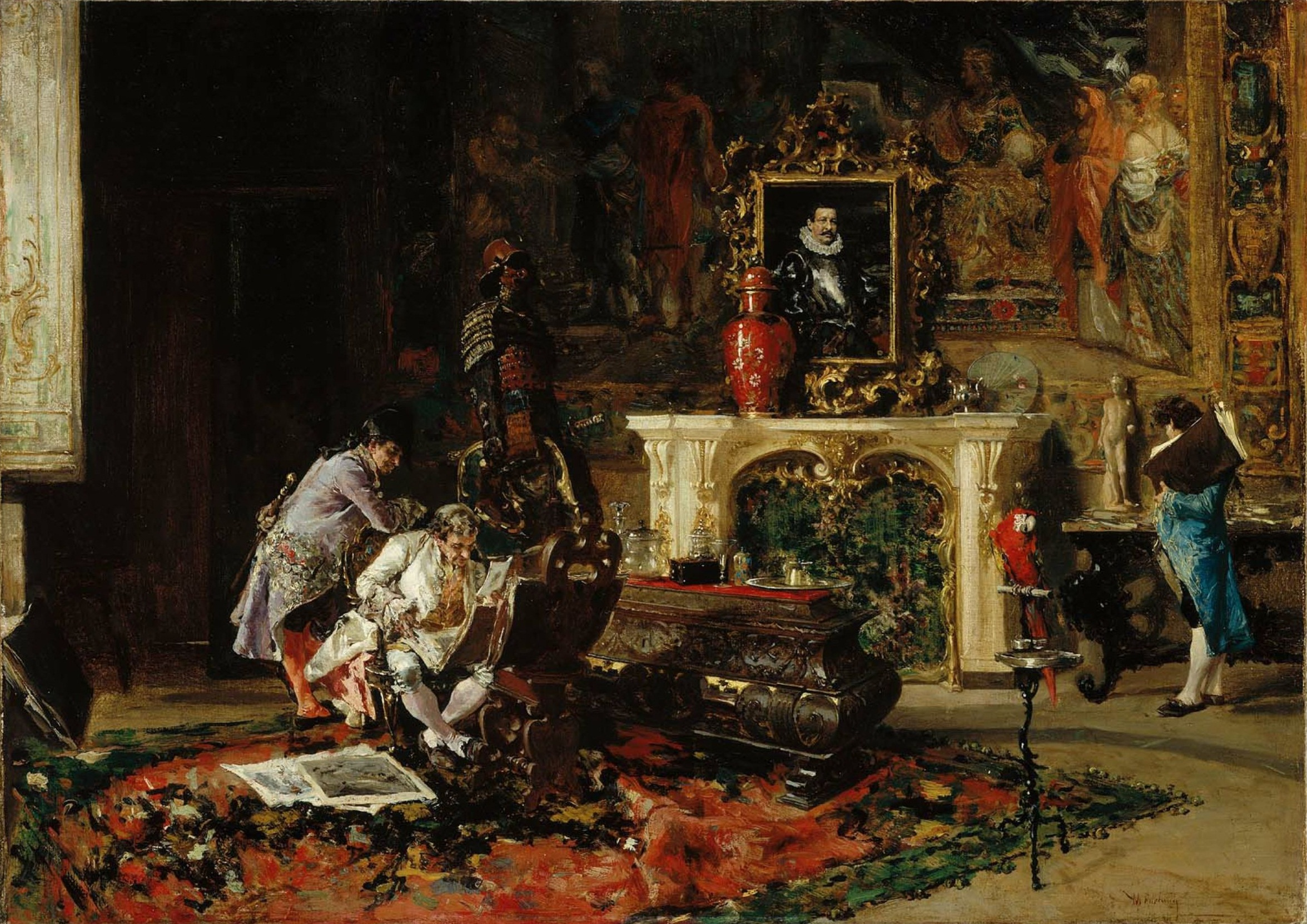
The Print Collector, 1863

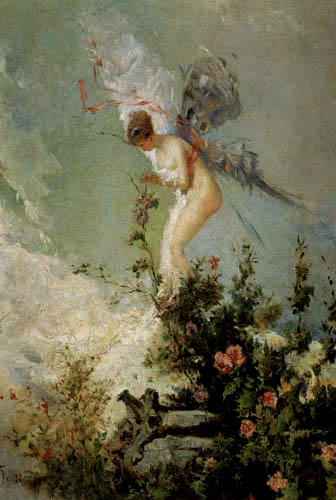
The dragonfly, 1866 (Museu de Belles Arts de València).

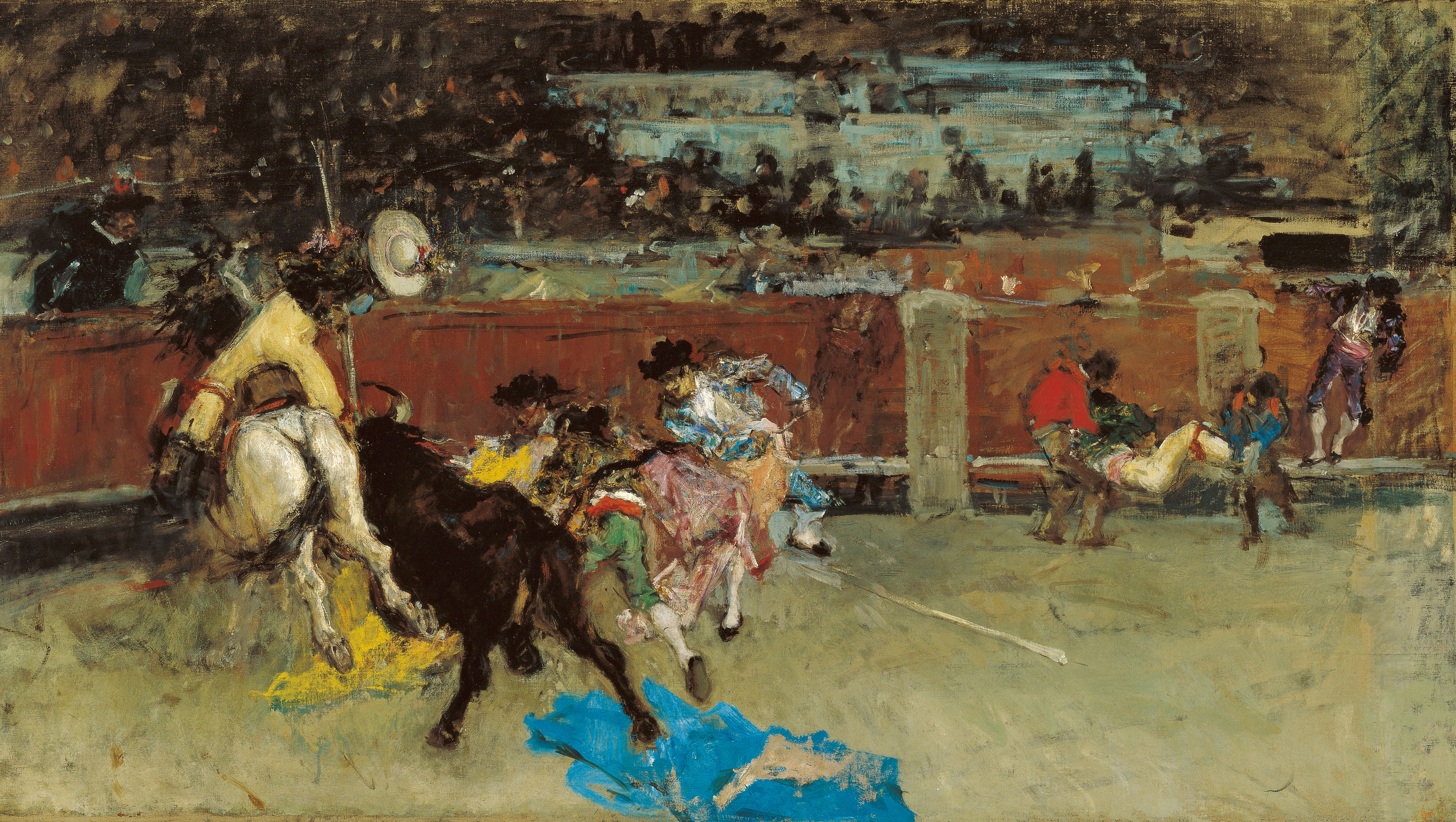
Bullfight. Wounded Picador, c. 1867

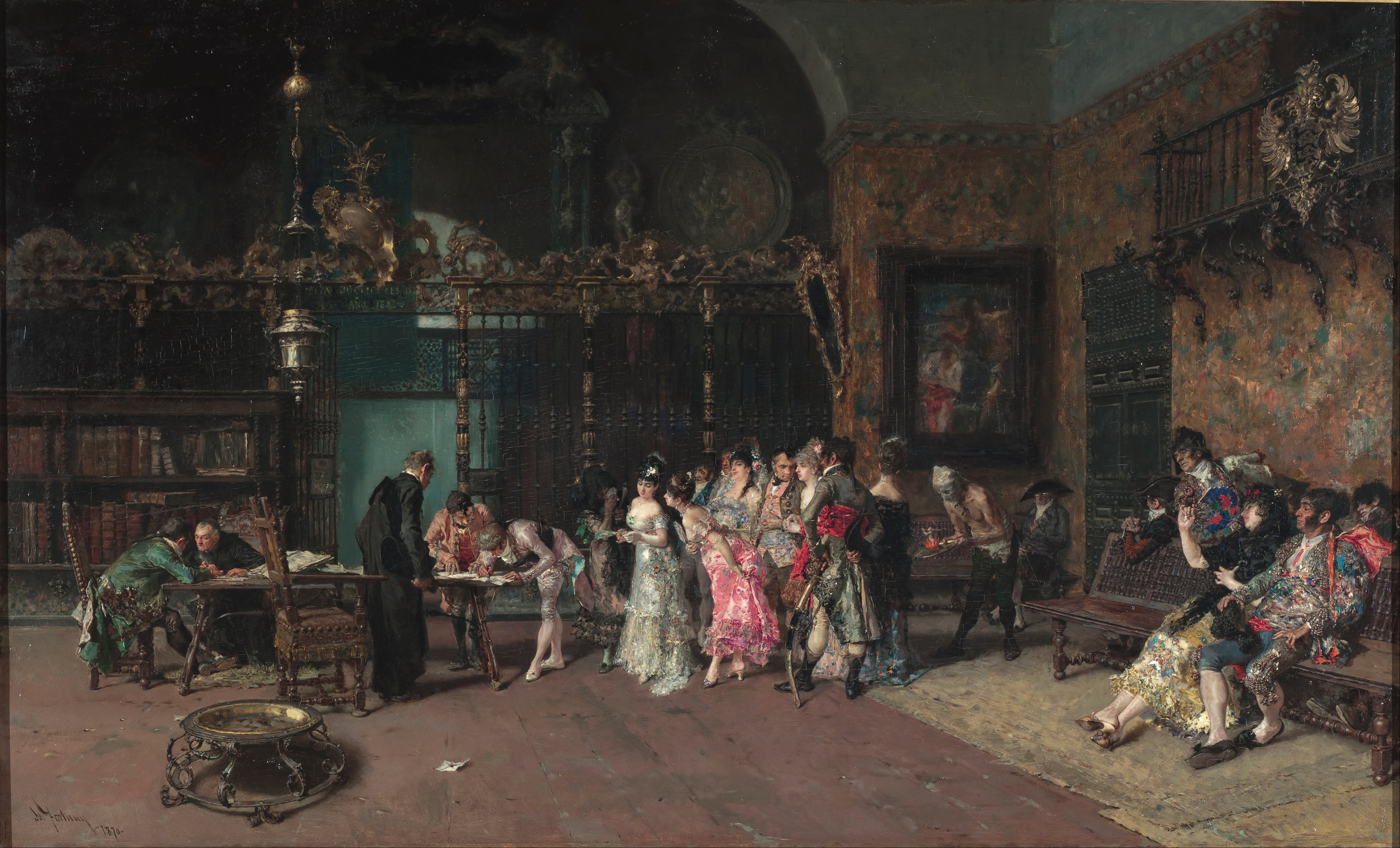
The Spanish Wedding, Museu Nacional d'Art de Catalunya, 1870

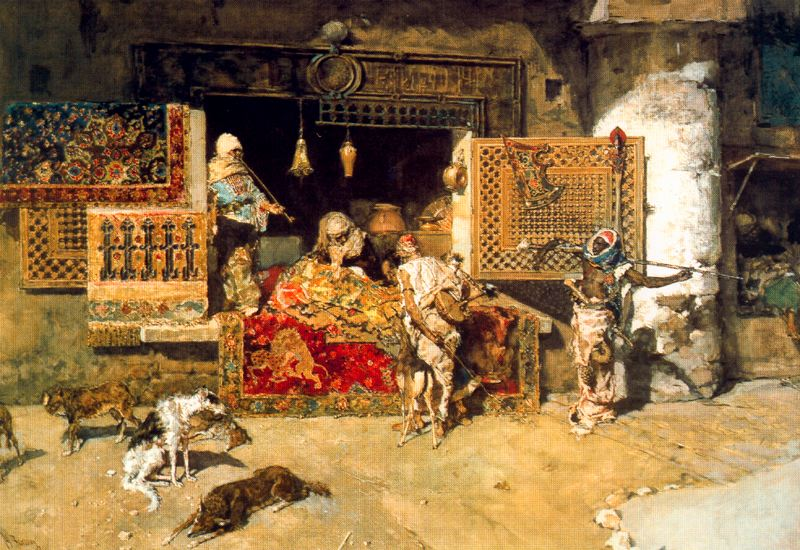
The Tapestry Seller, 1870

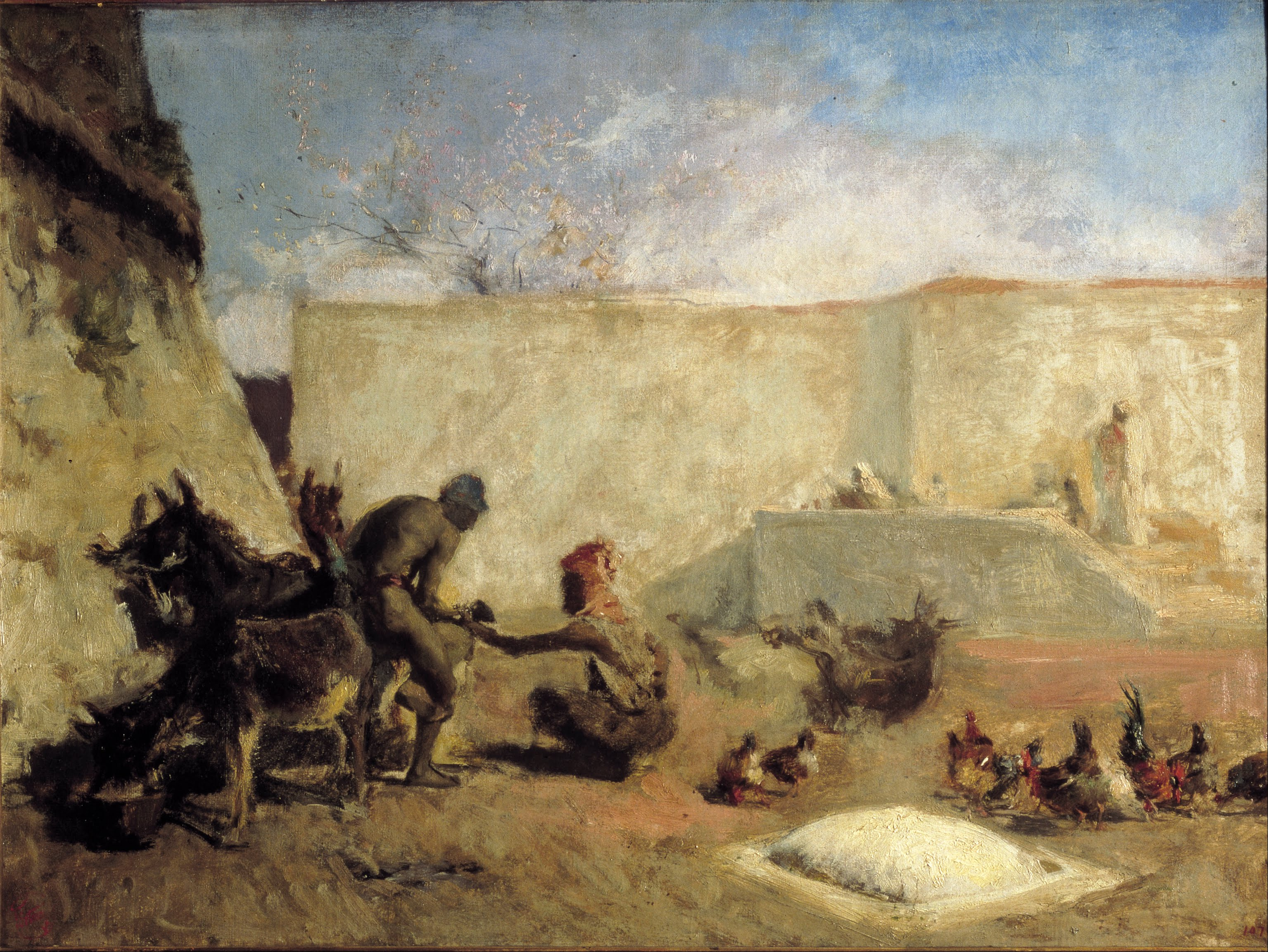
Moroccan Horseshoer, c. 1870

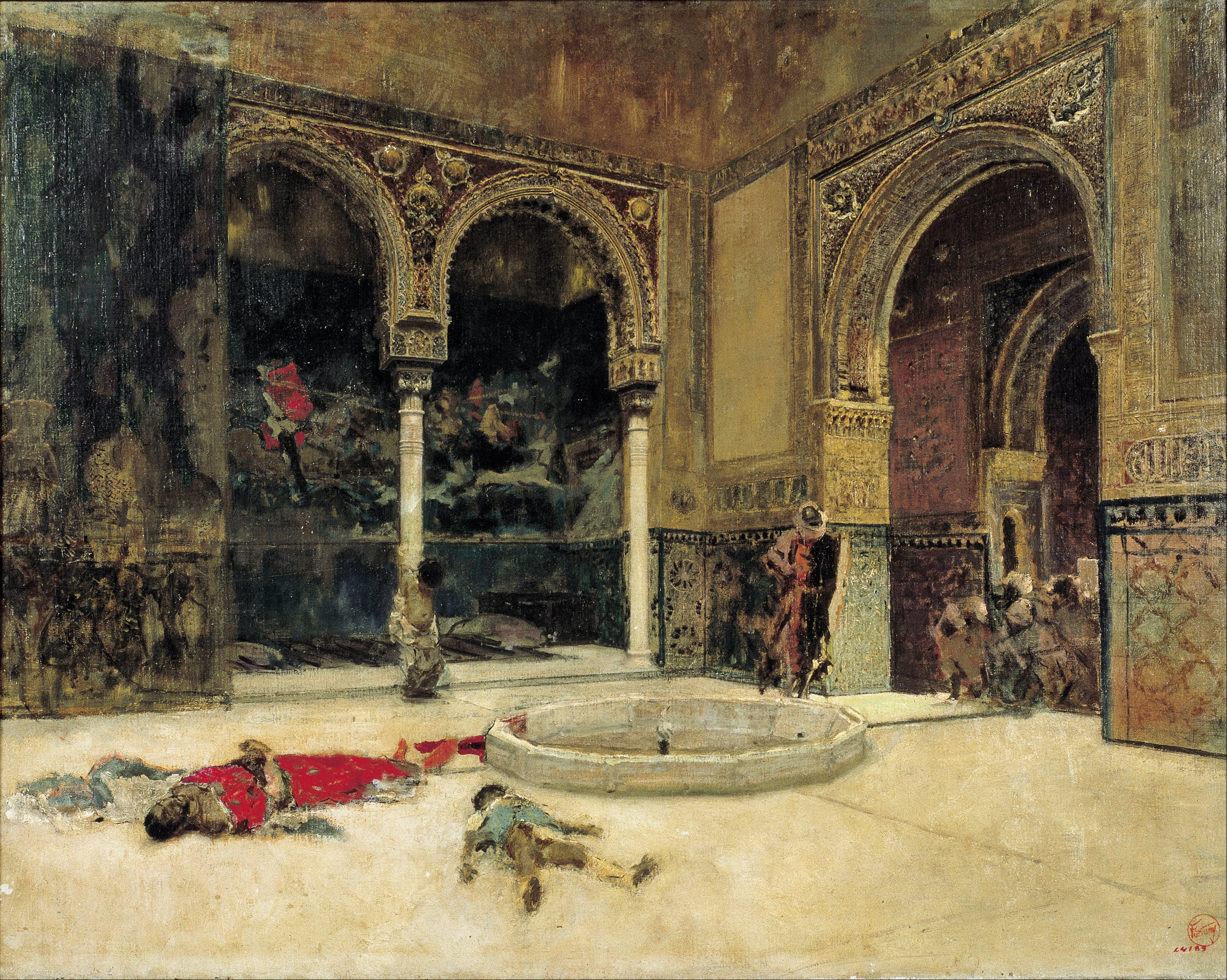
The Slaying of the Abencerrages, c. 1870

=== Works on paper ===
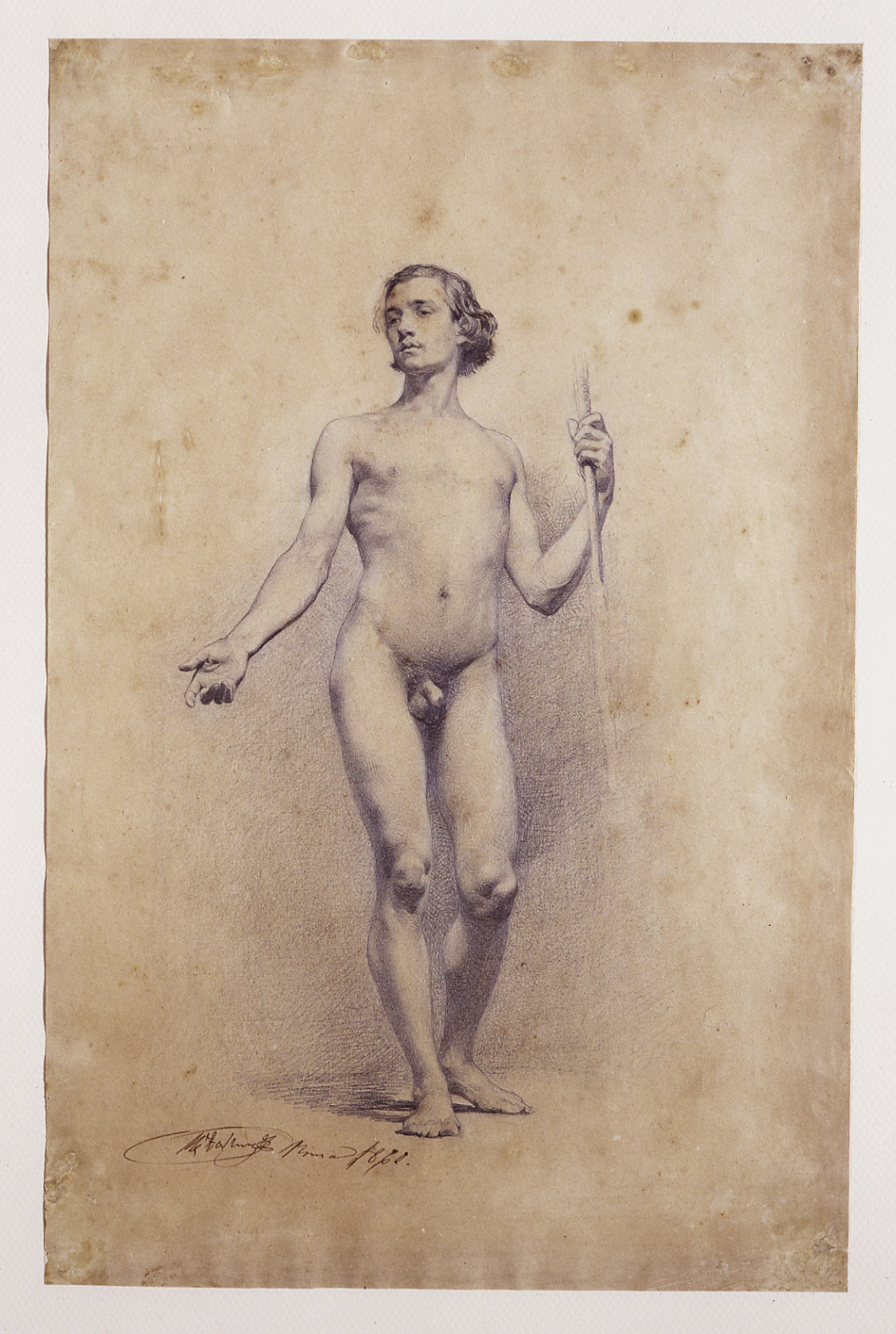
Nude Young Man with Spear, pencil on paper, 1860

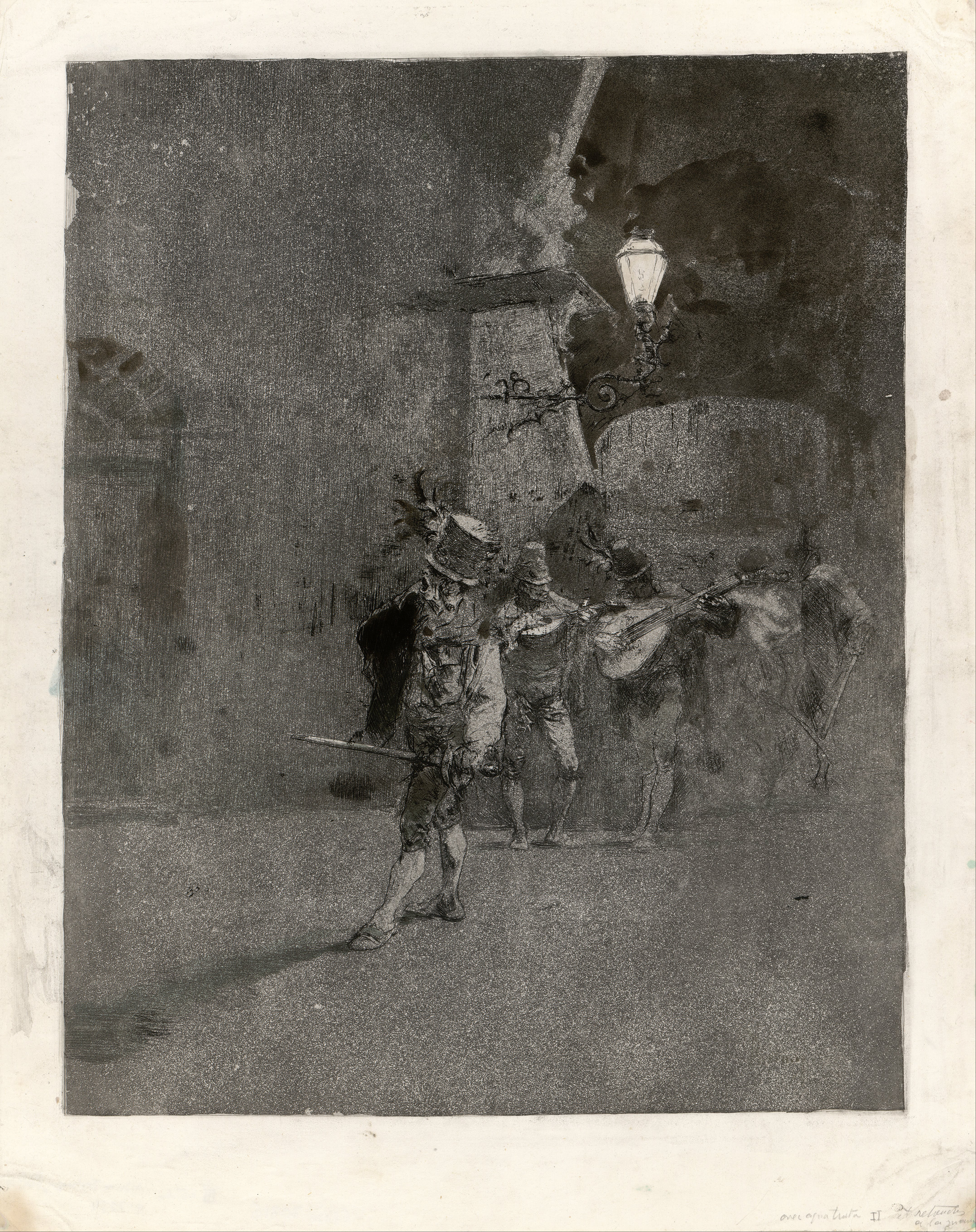
Night Watch, etching and aquatint, c. 1863–1865

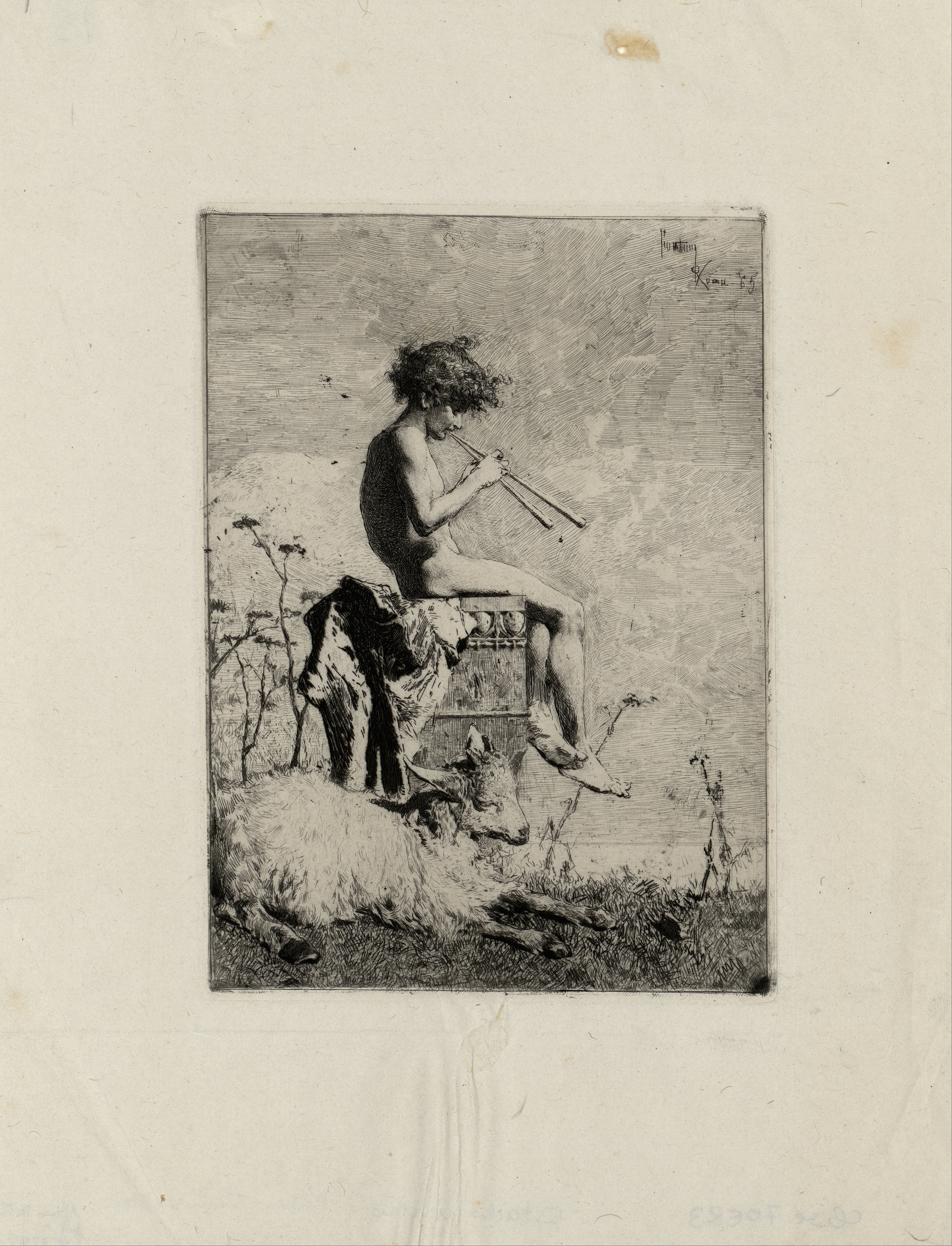
Idyll, etching, 1865

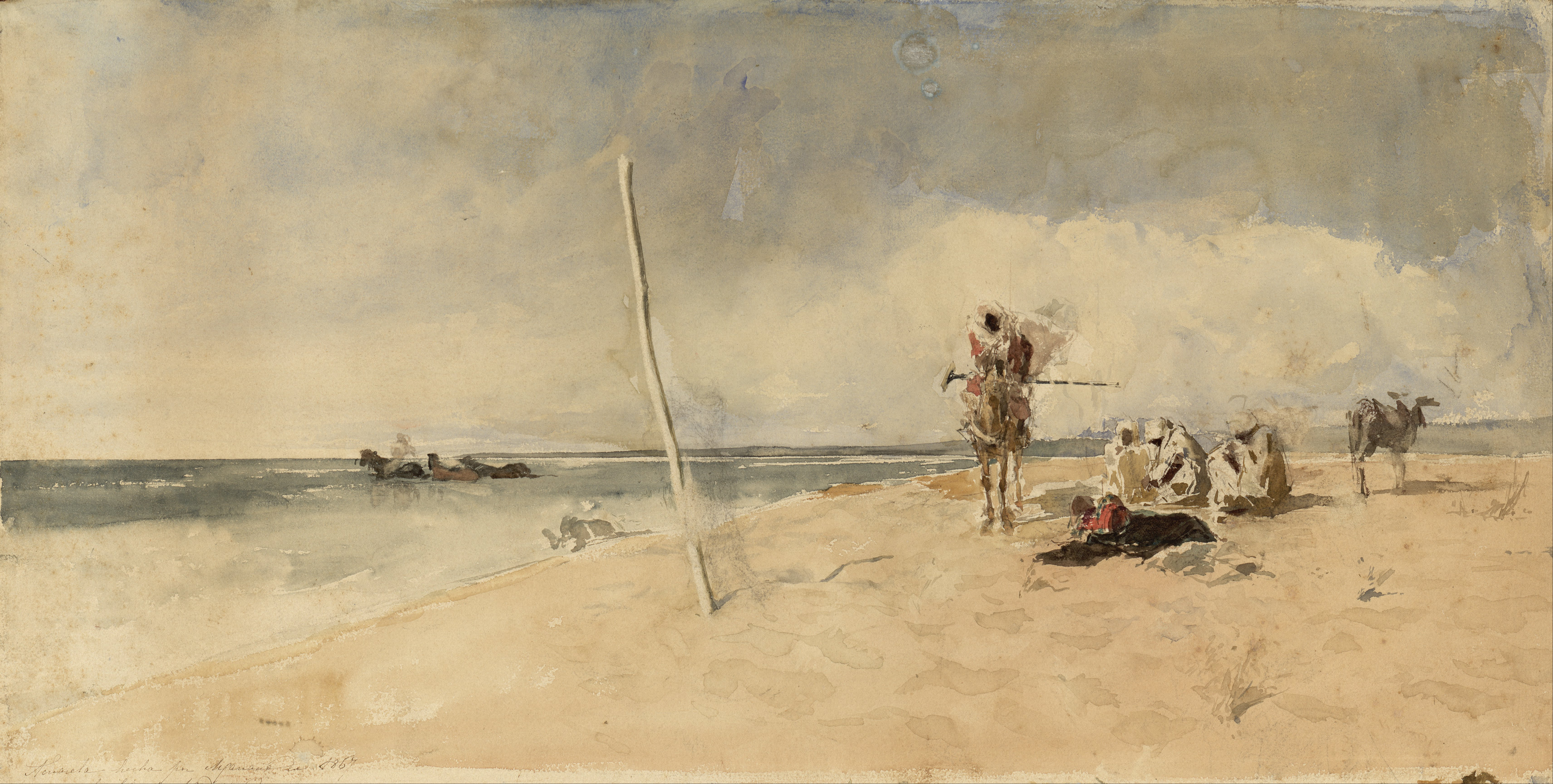
African Beach, watercolor, c. 1867

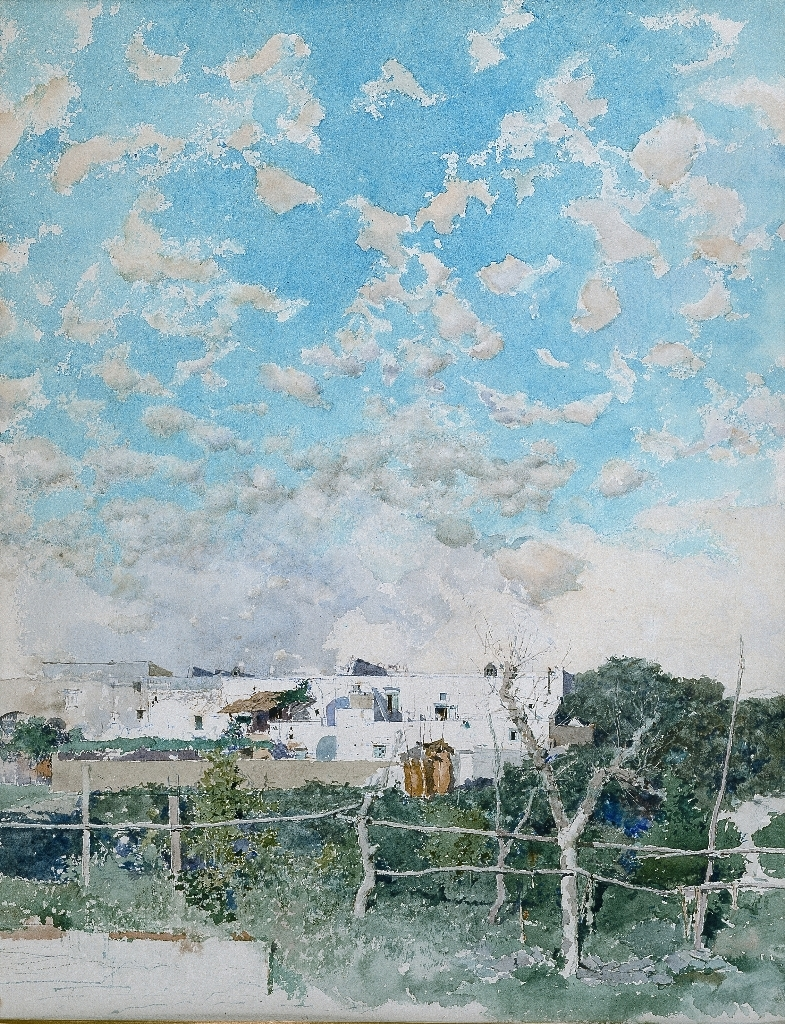
Paisatge de Portici, watercolor and gouache, 1874

== See also ==
- List of Orientalist artists
- Orientalism
- Palazzo Fortuny in Venice, Italy
- List of Mariano Fortuny's Paintings (in Catalan)

== Bibliography ==
- Entry for Mariano Fortuny y Marsal in Gran Encicplopèdia Catalana (in Catalan).
- Charles Davillier, Fortuny, sa vie, son œuvre, sa correspondance, etc. (Paris, 1875).
- Charles Yriarte, Fortuny (Artistes célèbres series) (Paris, 1889).

== Sources ==
- Charles Yriarte and Richard Muther, ed. (1908). Masters in Art: A Series of Illustrated Monographs (Part 110 Volume 10). Congress Street, Boston: Bates and Guild company – via Digitized Googlebooks.
- Muther, Richard (1897). The History of Modern Painting (Volume 3). New York: Bates and Guild company/ E.P. Dutton and Company. pp. 308–315 – via Googlebooks digitized June 26, 2007. "Mariano Fortuny Richard Muther."
- James, Huneker (1922). Promenades of an Impressionist. New York: Charles Scribner's Sons. p. 128 – via Digitized Googlebooks. "James Huneker Promenades."
- 3 artworks by or after Mariano Fortuny at the Art UK site
