= Madrazo =

Madrazo is a Spanish surname and sometimes uses as "Maderazo" in the Philippines and US:

- Ángel Madrazo (born 1988), Spanish road cyclist
- Carlos Madrazo (1915–1969), Mexican politician
- Roberto Madrazo (born 1952), Mexican politician affiliated with the Institutional Revolutionary Party (PRI), son of Carlos Madrazo
- José de Madrazo y Agudo (1781–1859), Spanish painter
- Luis de Madrazo y Kuntz (1825–1897) Spanish painter, son of José de Madrazo y Agudo
- Pedro de Madrazo y Kuntz (1816–1898), Spanish art critic, son of José de Madrazo y Agudo
- Juan de Madrazo y Kuntz (1829–1880), Spanish architect, son of José de Madrazo y Agudo
- Federico de Madrazo y Kuntz (1815–1894), Spanish painter, son of José Madrazo y Agudo
- Raimundo de Madrazo y Garreta (1841–1920), Spanish realist painter, son of Federico de Madrazo y Kuntz
- Ricardo de Madrazo (1852–1917), Spanish Orientalist painter, son of Federico de Madrazo y Kuntz
- Cecilia de Madrazo (1846–1932), Spanish textile collector, daughter of Federico de Madrazo y Kuntz, married Spanish artist Mariano Fortuny
- Federico de Madrazo y Ochoa (1875–1934), Spanish painter, son of Raimundo de Madrazo and grandson of Federico de Madrazo y Kuntz
- Pablo Sierra Madrazo (born 1978), Spanish footballer
- Sergio Canales Madrazo (born 1991), Spanish footballer

== Meaning ==
"Madrazo" comes from the Valles Pasiegos in Cantabria and Espinosa de los Monteros in Burgos, northern Spain. The origin of the name is unknown but in Spanish and Portuguese it is understood to refer the process by which the second wife of widower man takes care of the children of the deceased first wife.

== Spanish artists ==
In Spain, the name Madrazo is strongly associated with an important dynasty of artists. Members of the Madrazo family literally dominated 19th-century painting in Spain. Don Jose de Madrazo y Agudo was a noted painter and teacher who became the Director of the Prado Museum in 1838. His sons were Federico de Madrazo y Kuntz (1815–1894), a painter; Luis de Madrazo y Kuntz (1838–1894), a painter; Pedro de Madrazo y Kuntz (1816–1898), an art critic and Juan de Madrazo y Kuntz, an architect; while his grandsons were Raimundo de Madrazo y Garreta (1841–1920), a painter and Ricardo de Madrazo y Garreta (1852–1917), also a painter. His grand-daughter, Cecilia de Madrazo y Garreta married the celebrated Orientalist artist, Mariano Fortuny (1838–1874).
