= Ricardo de Madrazo =

Spanish painter

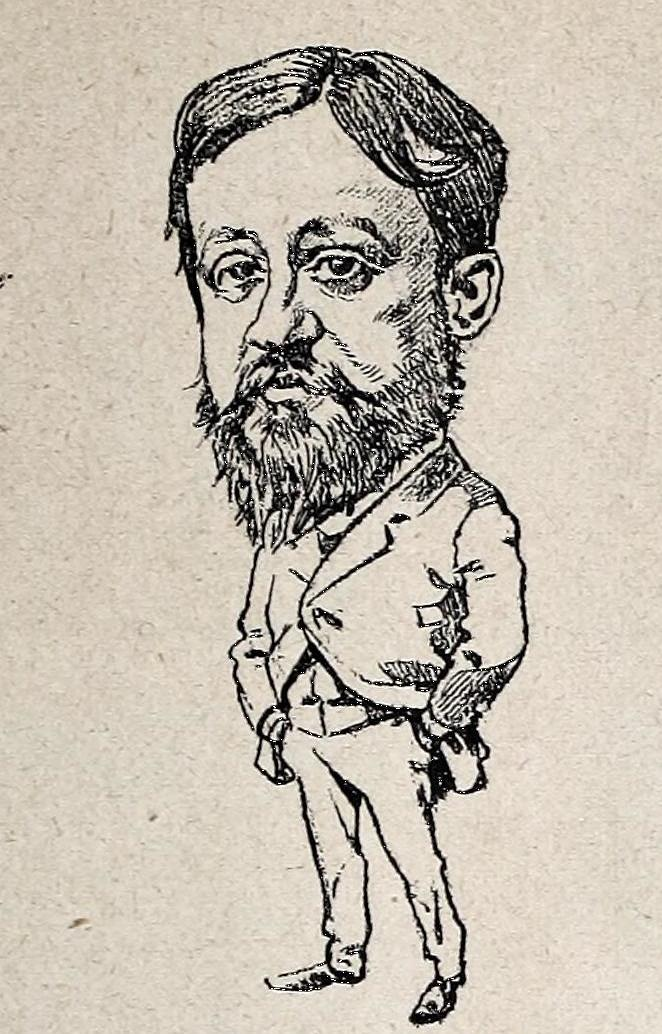
- Portrait by Ramón Cilla (1894)
- Born: Ricardo Federico de Madrazo y Garreta; 7 February 1852; Madrid, Spain
- Died: 18 August 1917 (aged 65); Madrid
- Education: Real Academia de Bellas Artes de San Fernando; Accademia Chigi, Rome
- Known for: Painter
- Movement: Orientalist

Ricardo Federico de Madrazo y Garreta (7 February 1852 – 18 August 1917) was a Spanish painter from the Madrazo family of artists, best known for his Orientalist works. He was also the brother-in-law of the great Spanish Orientalist, Mariano Fortuny, who would be a major influence on both his life and work.

== Biography ==
Ricardo Frederico de Madrazo y Garretta was born in Madrid into a family of artists with a noble background. His grandfather was José de Madrazo, the painter and former Director of the Prado Museum; his father was Federico de Madrazo, also a painter; his uncles were Luis de Madrazo, a painter, Pedro de Madrazo, an art critic and Juan de Madrazo, an architect; while his brother was Raimundo de Madrazo y Garreta, also a painter. His maternal grandfather was Tadeusz Kuntze, a Polish painter. The Madrazo family have been described as one of the most important painting dynasties, who literally dominated 19th-century painting in Spain.

Madrazo and his brother, Raimundo, initially studied art with their father. Later he pursued formal studies at the Real Academia de Bellas Artes de San Fernando with Joaquim Espalter and the sculptors Ricardo Bellver and Ponciano Ponzano.

In 1866, he became friends with Marià Fortuny, who would have a major influence on his art and life. The following year, Fortuny married his sister, Cecilia de Madrazo. He accompanied the Fortuny family to Toledo, then went with him to Rome, where he studied at the Accademia Chiggi. Later, he and his brother Raimundo would work in Fortuny's studio.

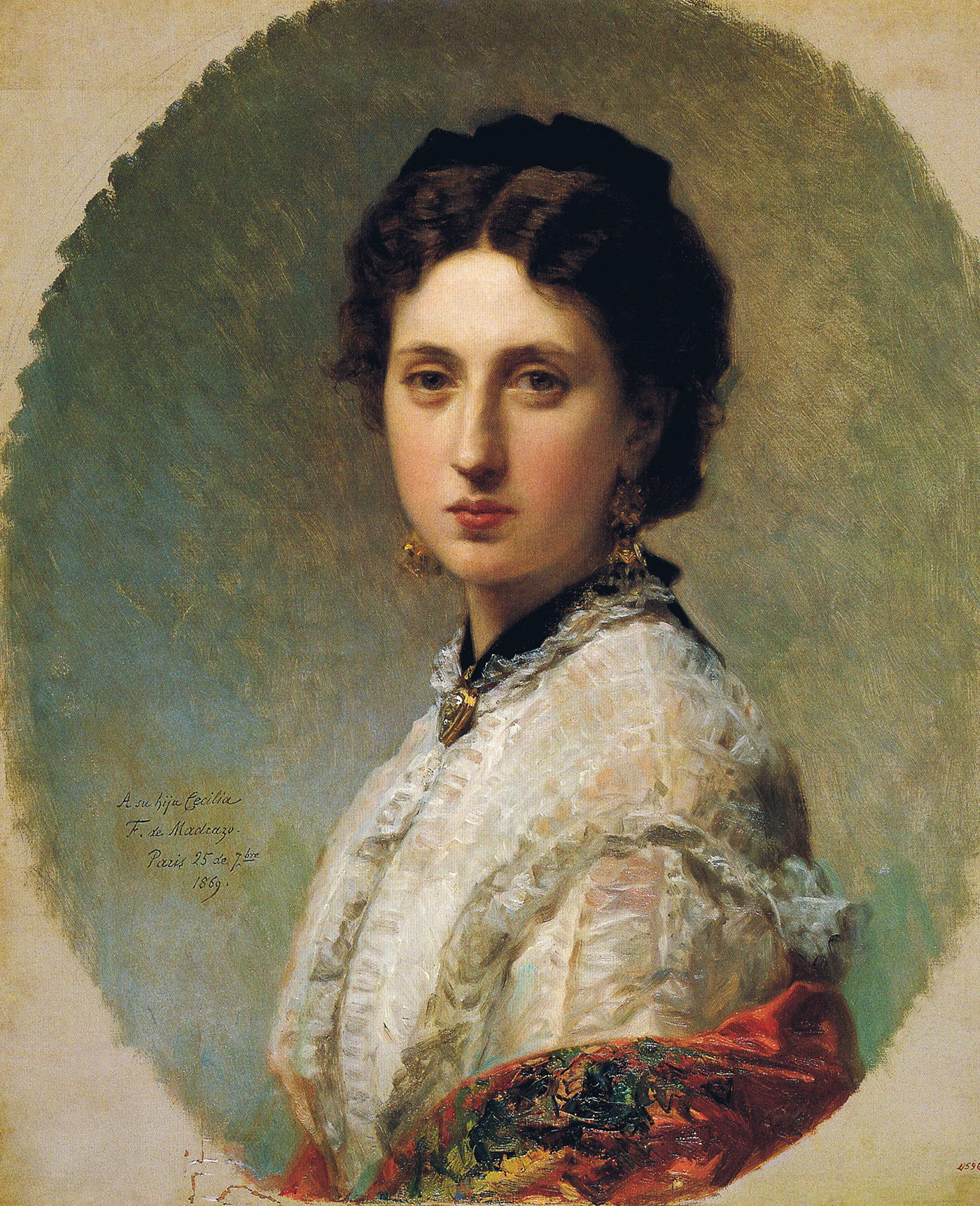
Cecilia de Madrazo, painting by Frederico de Madrazo, 1869. Ricardo's sister, Cecilia married Ricardo's friend, the great Spanish painter, Maria Fortuny

De Madrazo accompanied Fortuny and his family again when they moved to Paris and spent his time copying works at the Louvre and the Musée du Luxembourg. During the Franco-Prussian War, he and Raimundo returned to Spain; settling in Granada. Later, he travelled to Morocco with Fortuny and Josep Tapiró, then returned to Rome. He travelled to Morocco again following Fortuny's untimely death in 1874. After Fortuny's death, de Madrazo took care of his studio; cataloguing his works and arranging for an auction at the Hôtel Drouot in Paris. Meanwhile, his sister, Cecilia, devoted the rest of her life to the preservation of her husband's memory.

After Fortuny's death, de Madrazo moved between Paris, Madrid and Tangiers; living in Venice for a short time, marrying in 1884 and finally settling in Madrid in 1885 and using it as base to make annual trips to Paris and Venice. Once established in Madrid, he began to focus on portraits, which were a Madrazo family specialty. Among those who visited him at his studio were Queen Maria Christina, the philanthropist Archer Milton Huntington, the French art collector Paul Durand-Ruel and President William Taft. His knowledge of ancient art made him a sought-after adviser.

== Work ==
His most well-known works include:

- Marroquíes (Moroccans)
- Turistas y Mendigos (Tourists and Beggars)
- Un Mercado de Fez (A Market in Fez)
- Alto en una Caravana árabe (Stop for an Arab Caravan)
- Atelier de Fortuny (Marià Fortuny's Studio in Rome), 1874 (now in the Museu Nacional d'Art de Catalunya)
- Resto de la Caravana Árabe (Rest for an Arab Caravan), 1880
- Un Árabe de Sud (A Moor from the South), 1881

== Selected paintings ==
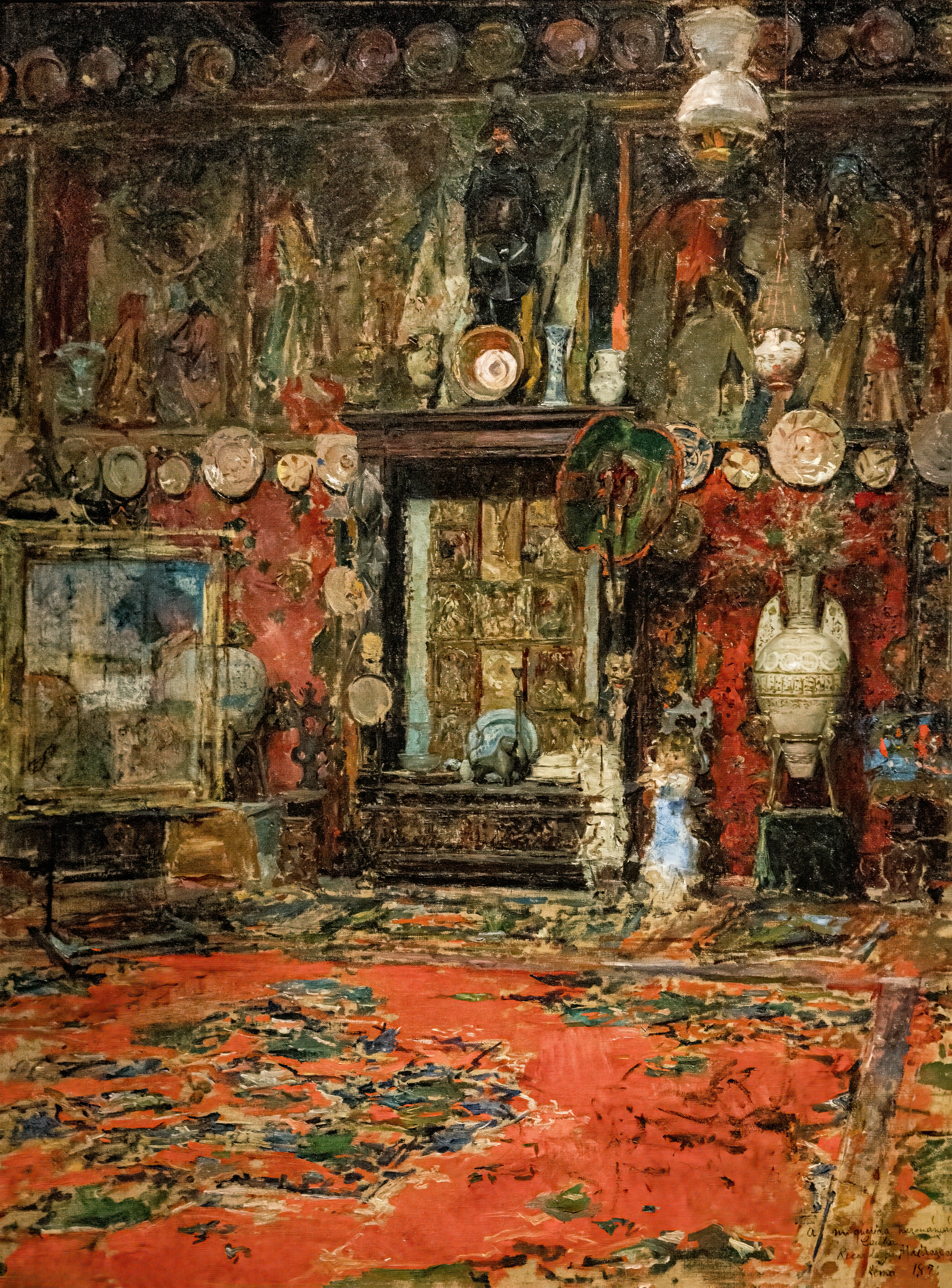
Marià Fortuny's Studio, 1874

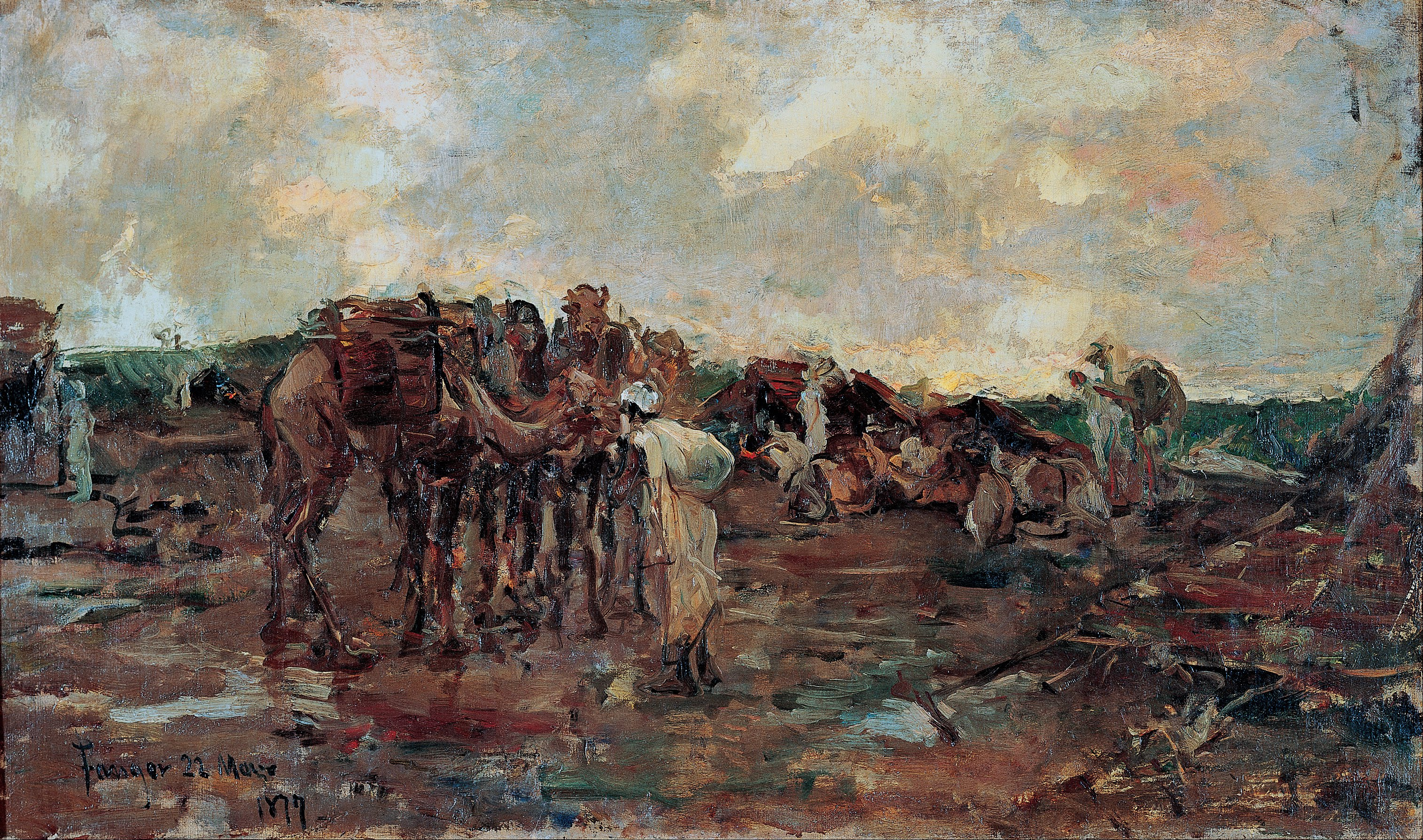
Rest Stop for an Arab Caravan, 1877

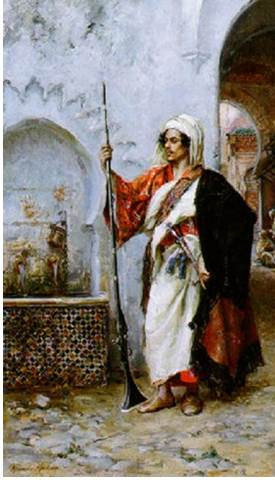
Arab Warrior by a Fountain, 1878

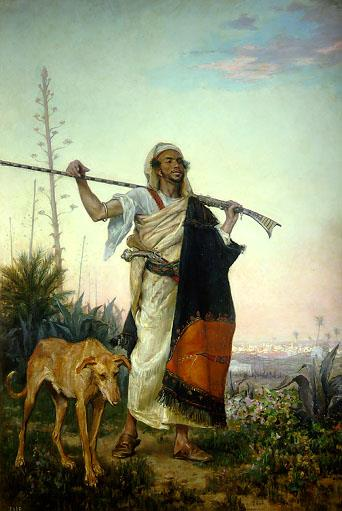
Moor from the South, 1881

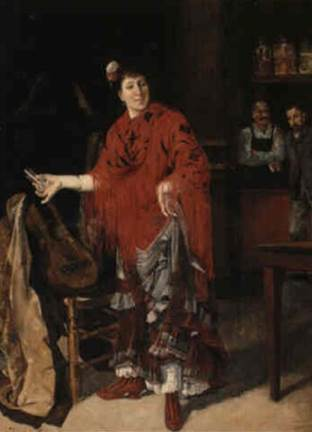
The Songstress, 1901

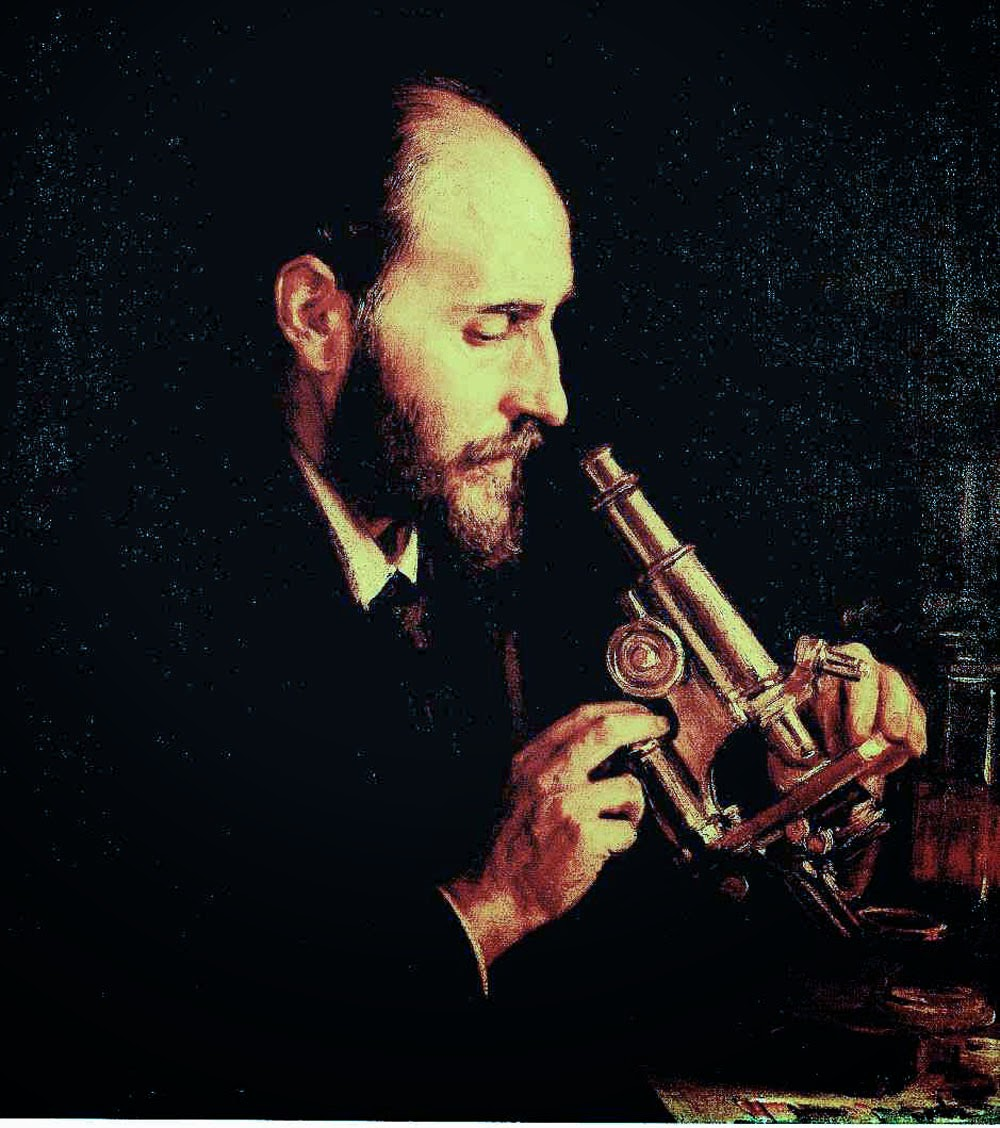
Portrait of Santiago Ramón y Cajal, 1910

== See also ==
- List of Orientalist artists
- Orientalism
