= Joaquim Espalter =

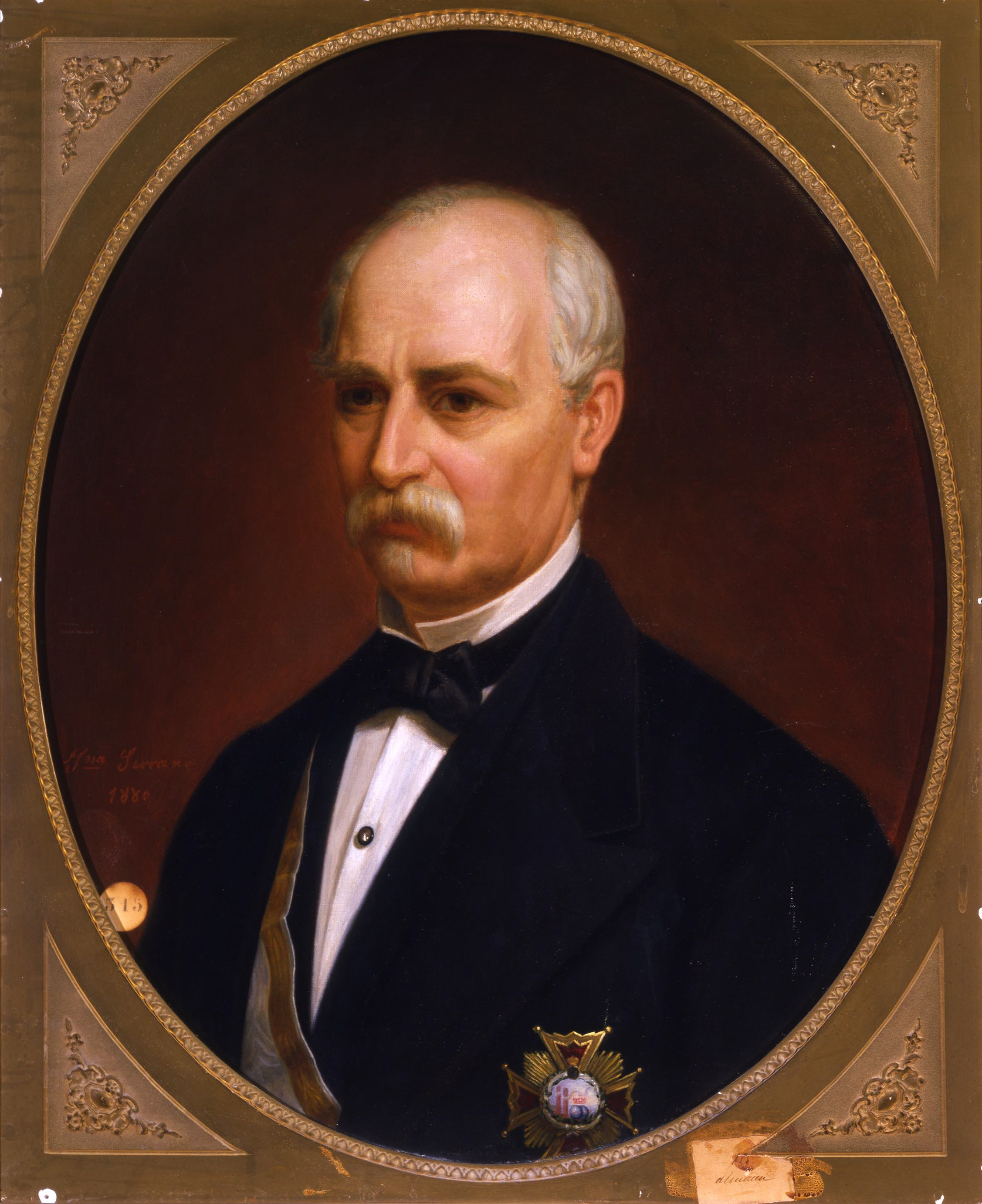
- Portrait of Joaquín Espalter (1880), by Joaquina Serrano, Real Academia de Bellas Artes de San Fernando, Madrid
- Born: Joaquim Espalter i Rull; 30 September 1809; Sitges, Catalunya, Spain
- Died: 16 January 1880 (aged 70); Madrid, Spain
- Education: Llotja School, Barcelona
- Known for: Painter

Joaquim Espalter i Rull or, in Spanish, Joaquín Espalter y Rull (30 September 1809 – 16 January 1880) was a Catalan painter who spent most of his career in Madrid; known primarily for portraits and historical scenes.

== Biography ==
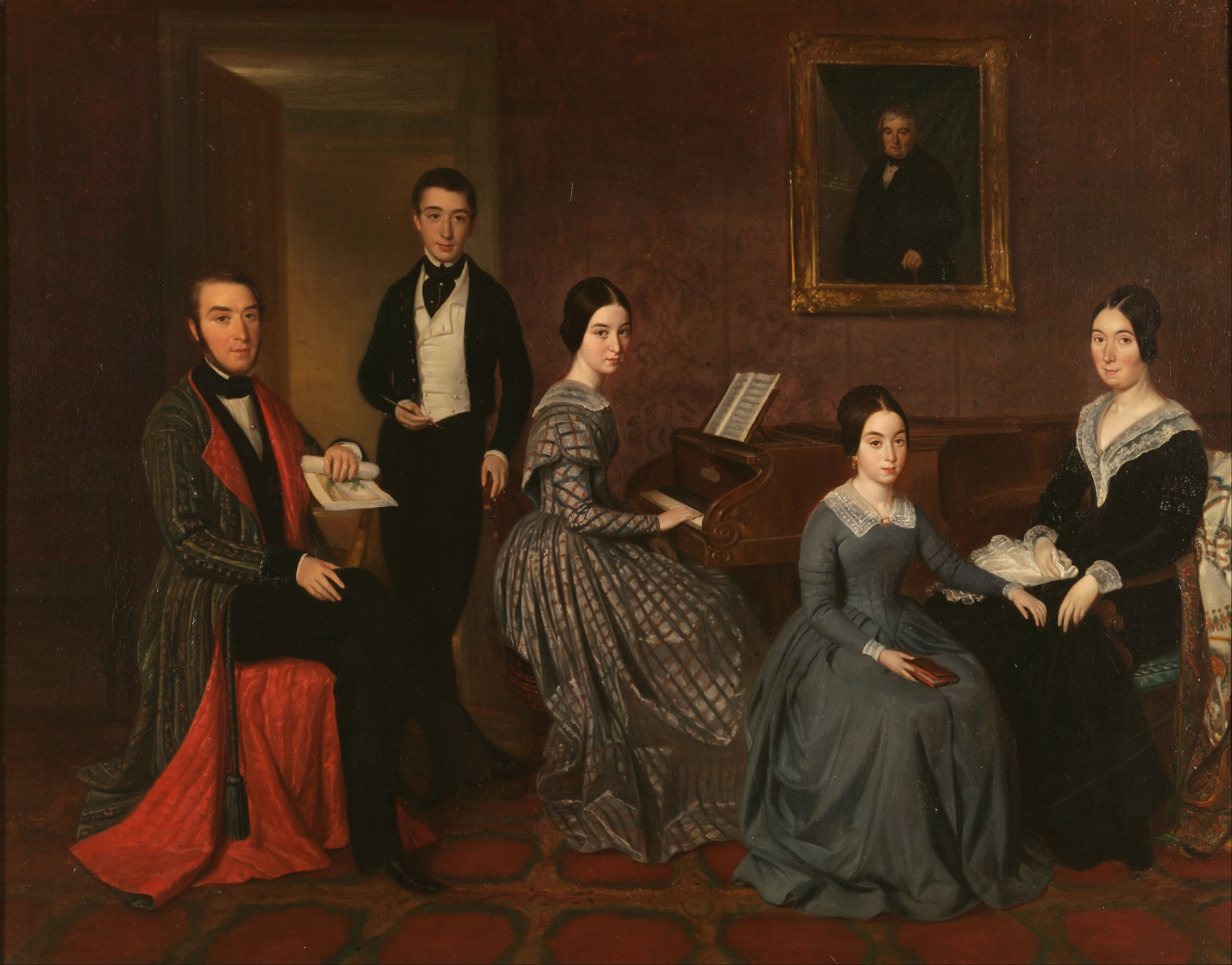
The Family of Jorge Flaquer (a banker)

He was born in Sitges to a merchant family from Barcelona, who were living in Sitges temporarily as a result of the Peninsular War. When they returned home, he studied at a Piarist school, following which he was sent to Montpellier for a year to study business. Between 1823 and 1828, having decided to devote himself to painting, he lived in Barcelona and attended the Escola de la Llotja.

After a brief stay at the École des Beaux-Arts in Marseille, he moved to Paris in 1829 and studied with Antoine-Jean Gros, then established himself in Rome in 1833, where he became part of a group of Catalan painters associated with the Nazarene movement, which included Claudi Lorenzale and Pelegrí Clavé. He was a great admirer of Fra Angelico and Giotto and made several visits to Tuscany. In 1839, he presented several works at a major exhibition in Florence.

In 1842, he settled in Madrid and was named an Academician at the Real Academia de Bellas Artes de San Fernando. In 1847, together with Federico de Madrazo and the writer Eugenio de Ochoa, he founded a short-lived artistic journal called El Renacimiento (The Renaissance). Later, he was named an honorary court painter by Queen Isabel II and, in 1860, a Professor of Drawing at the "Escuela Superior de Pintura, Escultura y Grabado".

He had a showing at the Exposition Universelle (1855) and became a regular participant in the National Exhibition of Fine Arts after 1870; occasionally serving on the jury. In 1872, he was awarded the Grand Cross of the Order of Isabella the Catholic.

Although he painted in a variety of genres, he became known as a portraitist and was very popular with the local bourgeoisie for his simple, direct style. In addition to his portraits, he also created decorations for the Teatro Español (1848) and painted murals for the Universidad Central (1853-1858) and the Palacio de Congreso de Diputados. In Pamplona, he collaborated on decorative work for the "Salón del Trono" at the Palacio de la Diputación (legislature), where he painted a mural depicting Íñigo Arista becoming the first King of Navarre.

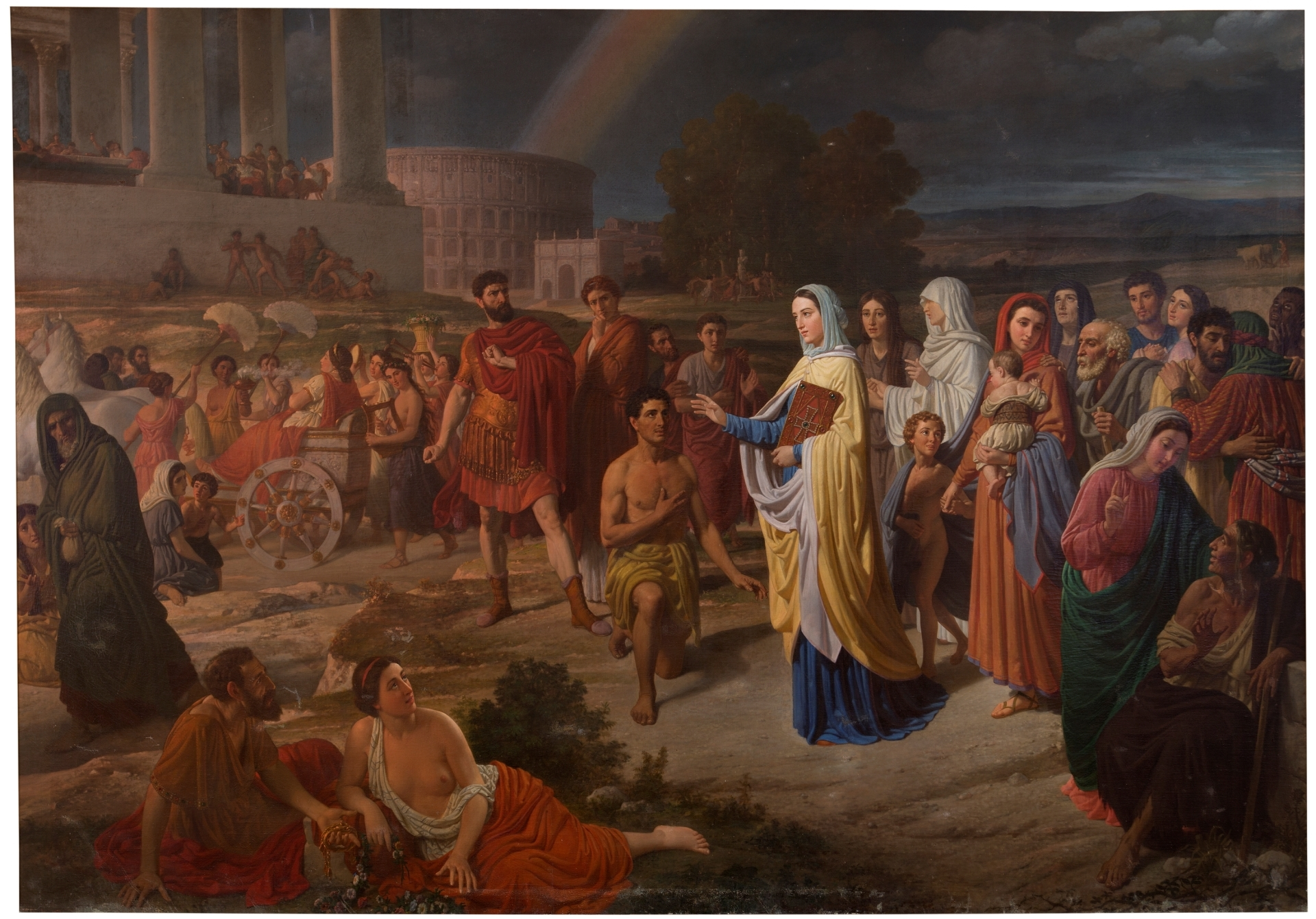
The Christian Era

He died in Madrid, aged 70.
