= Cecilia de Madrazo =

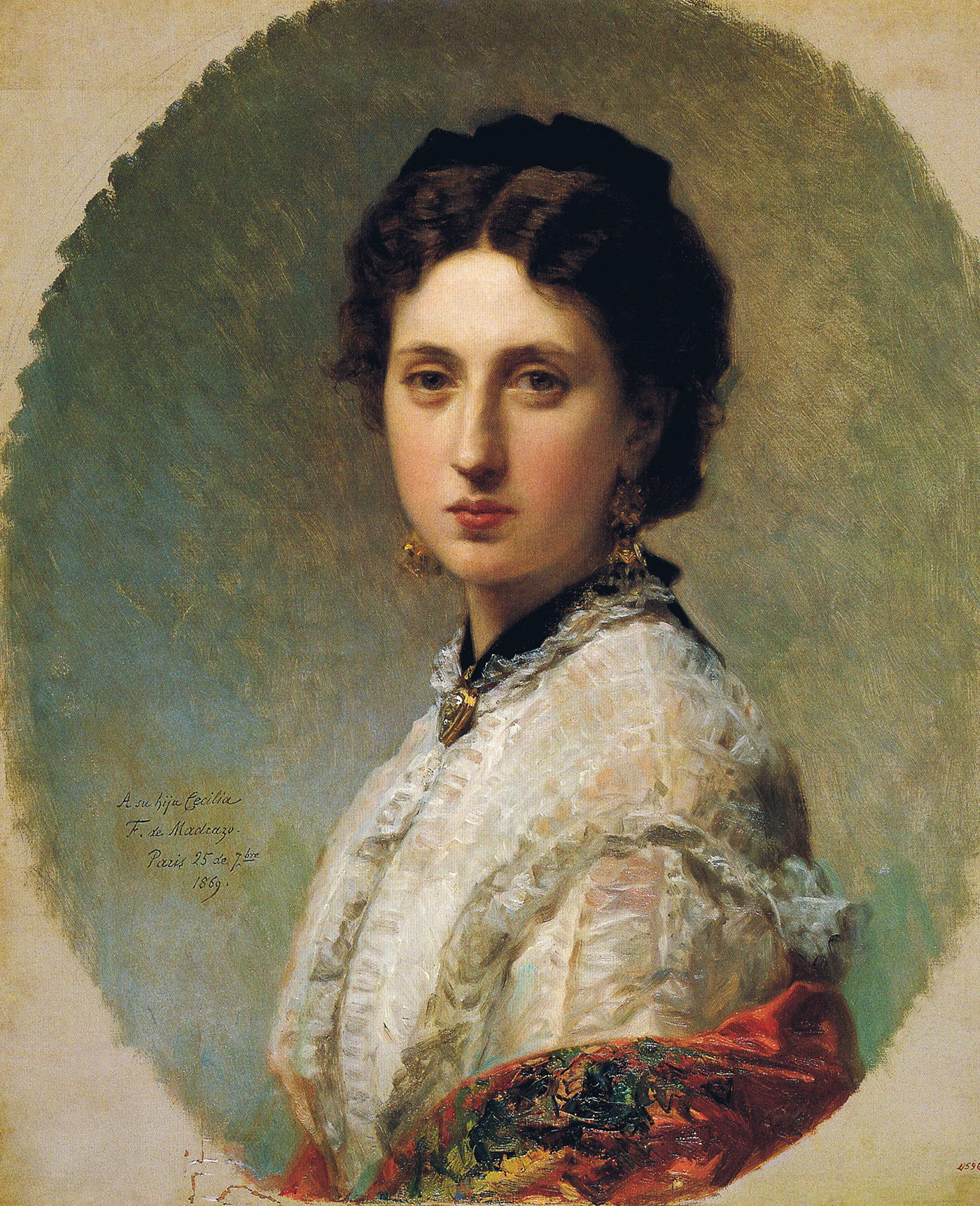
- Cecilia de Madrazo; portrait by her father, Federico de Madrazo (1869)
- Born: Cecilia de Madrazo y Garreta; 20 December 1846; Madrid, Spain
- Died: August 1932 (aged 85); Venice, Italy

Cecilia de Madrazo y Garreta (20 December 1846, in Madrid – August 1932, in Venice) was a collector of textiles. She was married to the famous Spanish artist, Marià Fortuny.

== Biography ==
She was born into a family of artists. Her father, Federico de Madrazo and grandfather, José de Madrazo, were both painters. Her grandmother, Isabel Kuntz Valentini was a daughter of the Polish painter, Tadeusz Kuntze. In addition, her uncles, Pedro de Madrazo and Luis de Madrazo were painters, and both of her brothers, Raimundo de Madrazo and Ricardo de Madrazo, would become painters as well.

As a child, she became an accomplished pianist and performed at various artistic gatherings and musical events. In 1867, she married Marià Fortuny, an artist who had already won considerable fame throughout Europe and, thanks to his financial success, was also a collector of art, weapons, ceramics and textiles. As his wife, she collaborated with him in seeking out antiquities and became a popular figure in the artistic circles that gathered around him. They had two children, María Luisa and Mariano Fortuny, who became a noted photographer and fashion designer. He also inherited his mother's passion for textiles.

She circulated throughout Madrid, Granada, Rome, Paris and Venice. In 1875, following the death of her husband a few months before, she and her children moved to Paris. In 1889, the family moved to what would be her last residence, the Palazzo Martinengo in Venice.

=== Textile collector ===
In the 19th century, textile collecting was a rather elitist and specialized field. Her connections among the artistic circles of Spain and Italy led to her often being consulted as an expert. Her interest in textiles began in Spain, when she first joined her husband in searching through old homes and shops, in hopes of finding some rare examples. In 1875, a few months after his untimely death, she moved to Paris and, with the assistance of her brother Raimundo and the Baron de Davillier, organized a sale of part of his estate. More than sixty textile pieces, dating from the thirteenth to the eighteenth centuries, were placed on auction. Those that did not sell formed the basis of her new personal collection. Many years later, in 1889, she began a new phase, when she moved from Paris to Venice. There, she established a studio that resembled her late husband's in Rome. At this point many people, knowing of her collection and expertise, donated pieces to her collection. She lived out the remainder of her life in Venice, with her daughter, María Luisa, surrounded by her ever-growing collection. Following her death in 1932, it was passed to her son, Mariano, to join his collection.
