= José de Madrazo =

Spanish painter (1781–1859)

José de Madrazo y Agudo
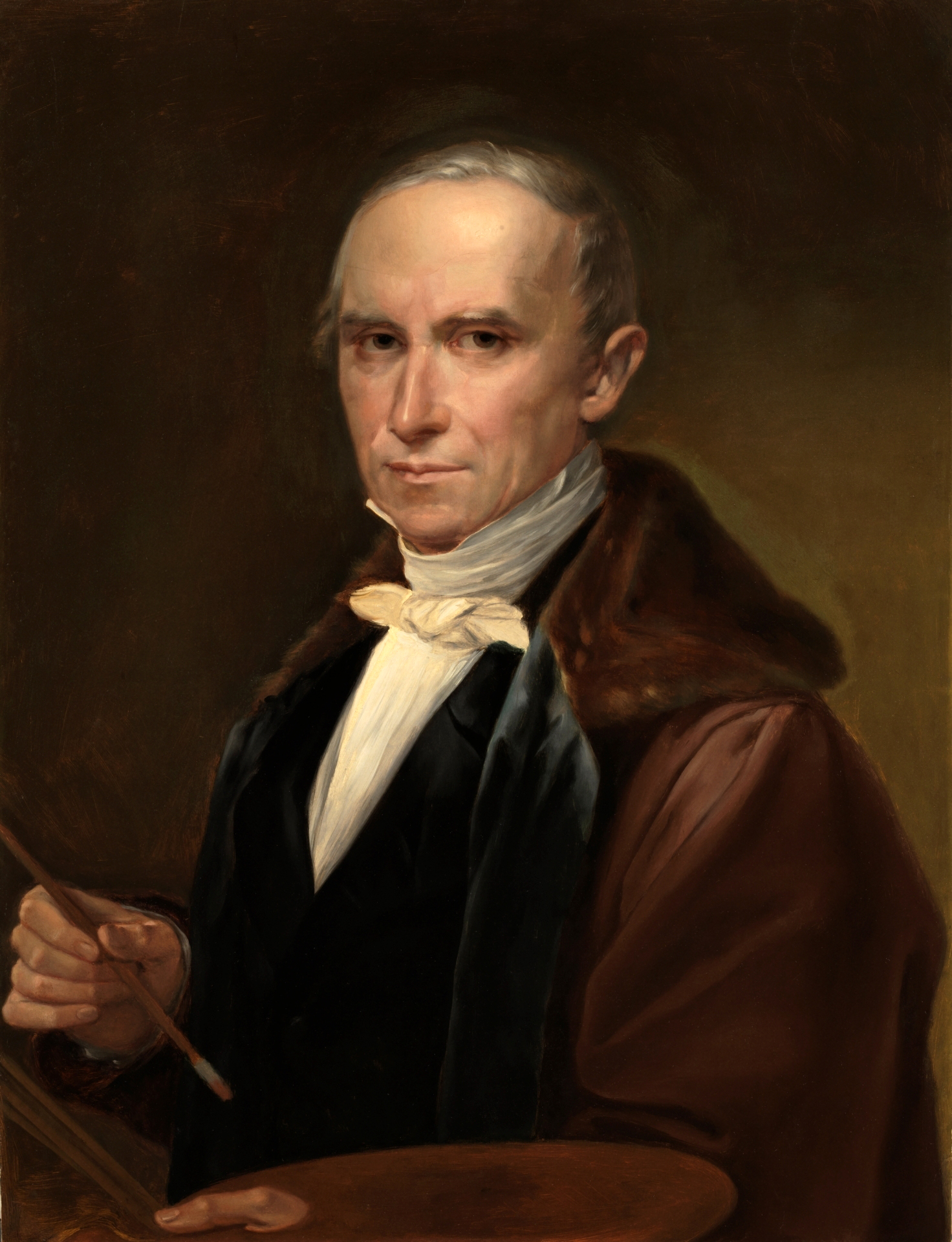
- Self-portrait, c.1840
- Born: José de Madrazo y Agudo; 22 April 1781; Santander, Spain
- Died: 8 May 1859 (aged 78); Madrid, Spain
- Education: Real Academia de Bellas Artes de San Fernando; Jacques-Louis David; Accademia di San Luca
- Occupations: Painter; etcher; lithographer; art collector
- Known for: Director of the Prado Museum
- Movement: Neoclassical
- Spouse: Isabel Kuntze (daughter of artist Tadeusz Kuntze)

José de Madrazo y Agudo (22 April 1781 – 8 May 1859) was a Spanish painter and engraver; one of the primary exponents of the Neoclassical style in Spain. He was the patriarch of a family of artists that included his sons Federico and Luis; and his grandsons, Raimundo and Ricardo.

== Biography ==
He was born in Santander, and began his studies at the Real Academia de Bellas Artes de San Fernando with Gregorio Ferro, a student of Anton Raphael Mengs. After 1803, he studied in Paris with Jacques-Louis David. Following David's advice, he applied for and received a government stipend to study in Rome.

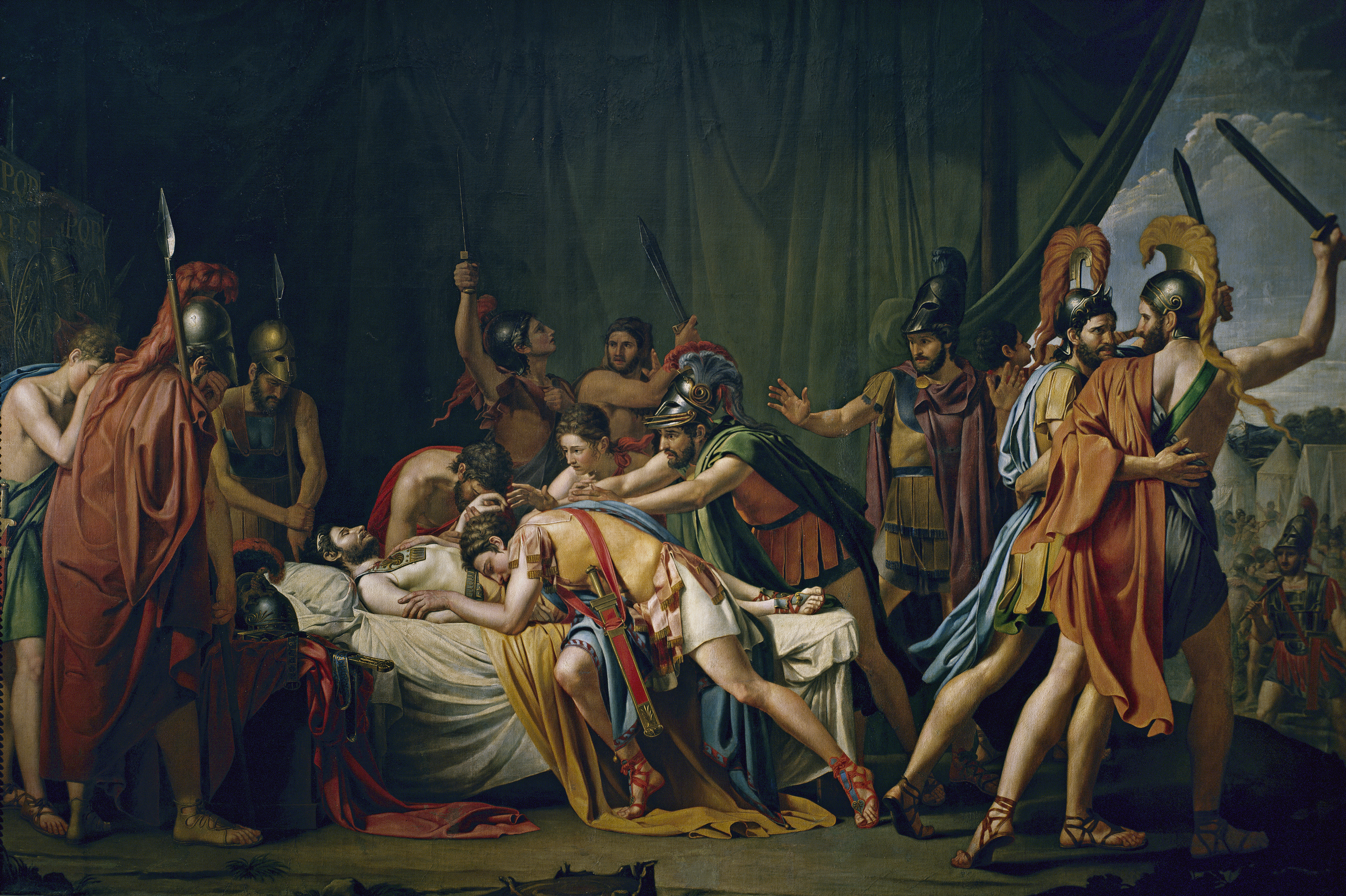
The Death of Viriatus, 1807

In 1806 he went to Rome, where he completed his training at the Accademia di San Luca and studied Classical art. While there, he had some initial success with his rendering of the death of Viriatus. He also refused to take an oath of allegiance to the new government of King Joseph I. As a result, he and the other Spanish artists living in Rome were effectively held prisoner at the Castel Sant'Angelo. There, he got to know the exiled King Carlos IV and his wife, María Luisa de Borbón.

In 1809, he married Isabel Kuntze (?–1866), daughter of the painter Tadeusz Kuntze, who was also staying in Rome. In 1812, King Carlos IV arrived in Rome and brought Madrazo into his circle, also buying La muerte de Lucrecia, a painting he had rejected only a few years previously. The king also commissioned Madrazo to copy several old paintings. That same year Madrazo also painted a portrait of Manuel Godoy, and the following year, portraits of Godoy's wife and children.

He lost this position in 1815 when the troops of Joachim Murat entered the Papal States in an effort to unify Italy under French control, prompting King Carlos to abandon his exile.

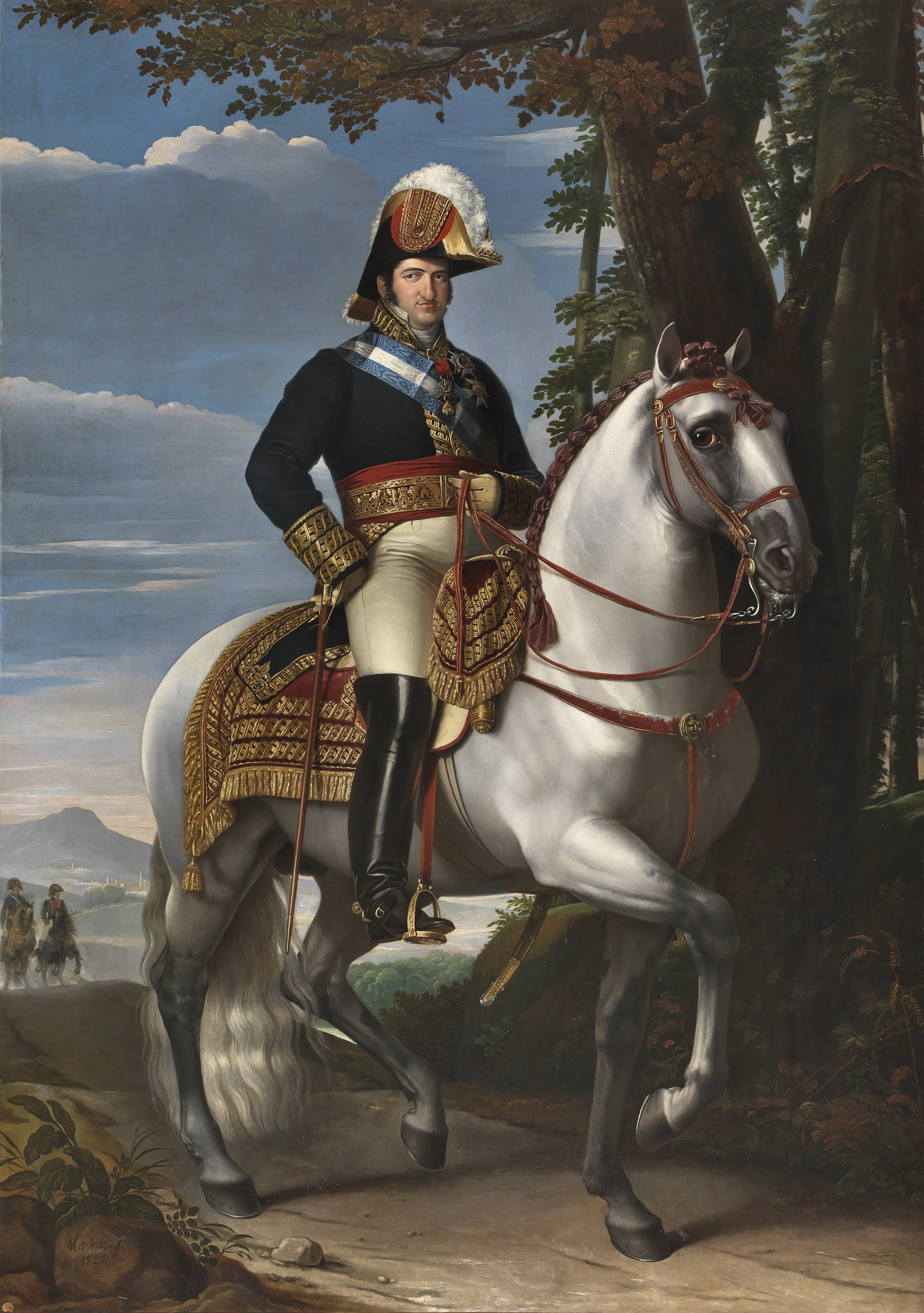
Equestrian Portrait of Fernando VII, 1821

In 1818, after the Restoration, he returned to Madrid with his paintings. Once there, he occupied himself by arranging and cataloguing the collection at the newly established Real Museo de Pinturas y Esculturas (now the Museo del Prado), on behalf of King Fernando VII. The catalog included lithographs of the paintings, marking the first major use of this technique in Spain.

In 1823, he was appointed Director of the Real Academia de Bellas Artes de San Fernando and, in 1838, became Director of the Museo del Prado; a position he held until 1857 when he resigned in the face of some Royal criticism. He died in Madrid, aged 78, having amassed a large private art collection, which later passed into the hands of the Marqués de Salamanca and, after his death in 1883, became dispersed.

Madrazo focused on religious and historical themes and, together with José Aparicio, helped to establish a movement devoted to patriotic art. His later works were often criticized for being emotionally cold and excessively grandiloquent.

The Madrazo family have been described as one of the most important painting dynasties in 19th-century Spain. His sons were Federico de Madrazo, a painter; Luis de Madrazo, a painter; Pedro de Madrazo, an art critic and Juan de Madrazo, an architect; while his grandsons were Raimundo de Madrazo y Garreta, a painter and Ricardo de Madrazo, also a painter. His granddaughter Cecilia de Madrazo married the celebrated artist Mariano Fortuny.

== Gallery ==
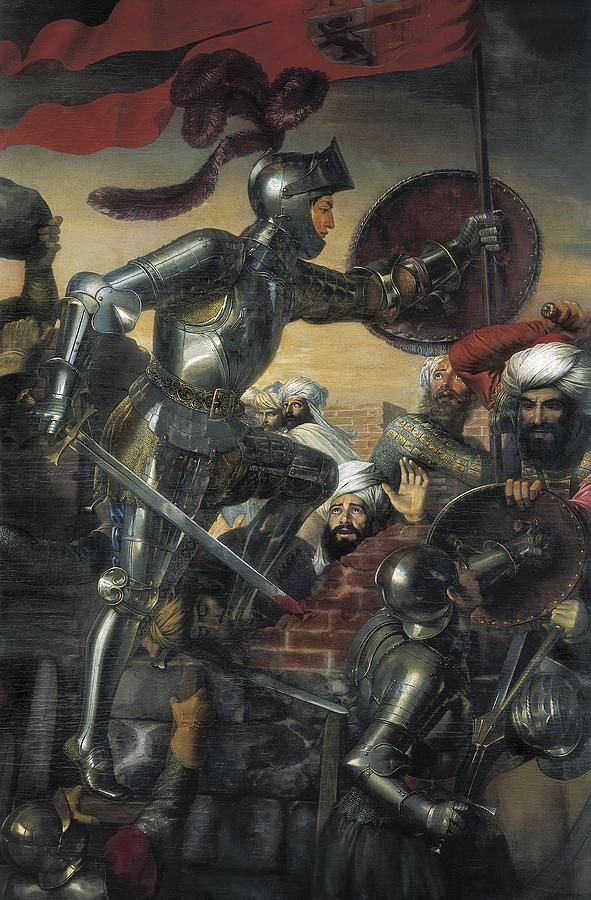
The Great Captain at the assault on Montefrío. Alcázar of Segovia

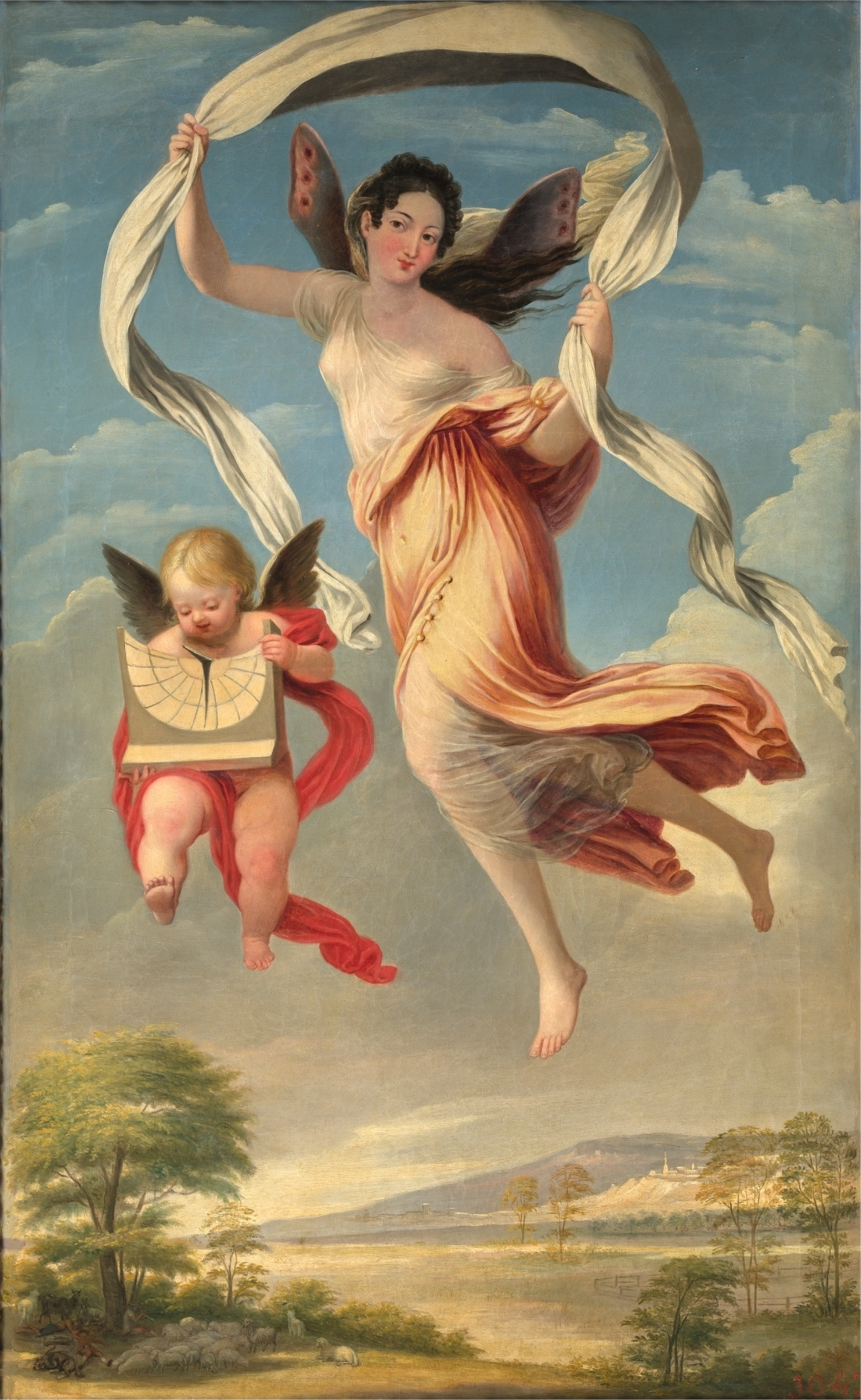
Allegory of Noon, 1819

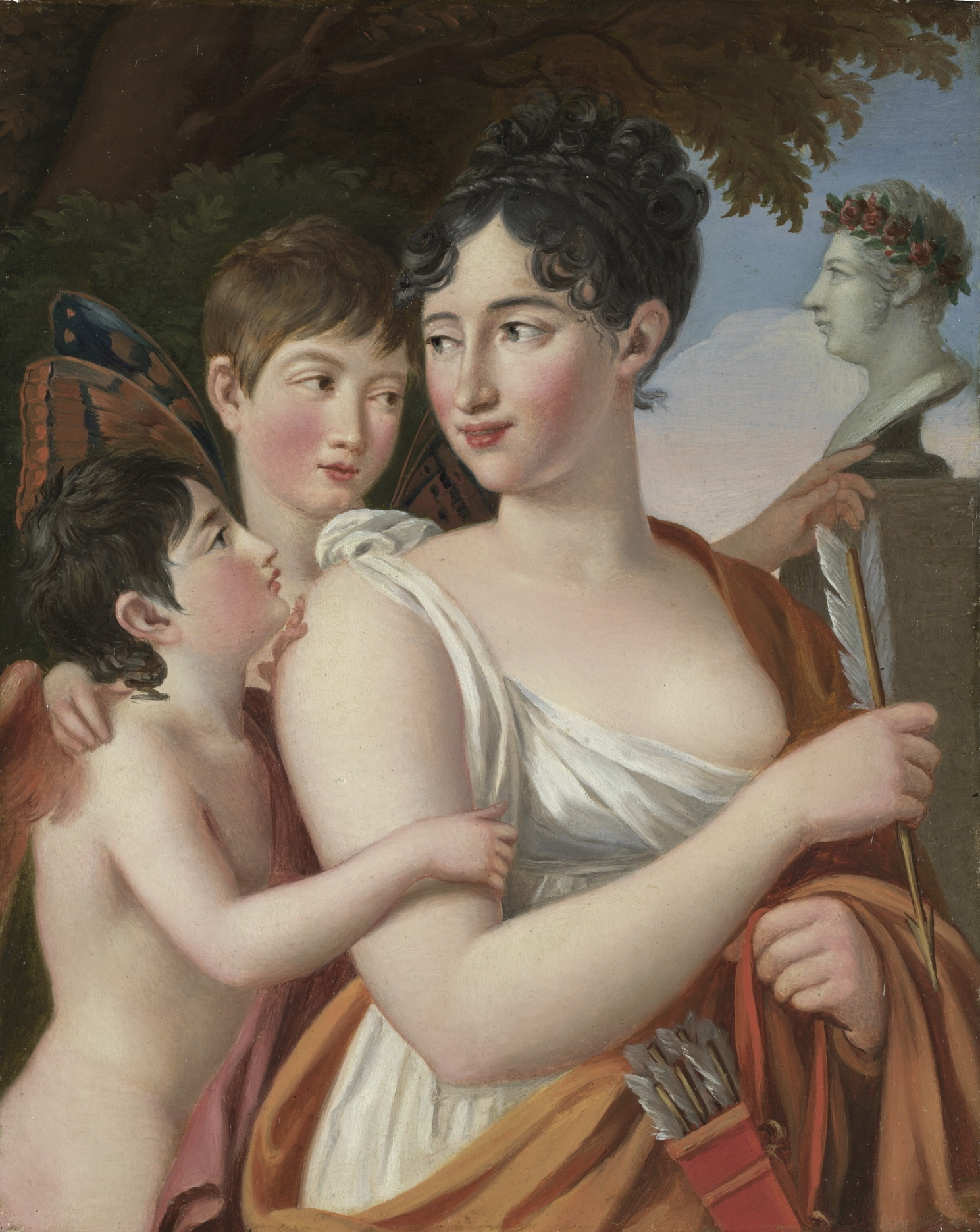
Josefa Tudó, 1st Countess of Castillo Fiel, with her sons Manuel and Luis Godoy, in a garden next to a bust of Manuel Godoy, 1812
