= Luis de Madrazo =

Spanish painter (1825-1897)

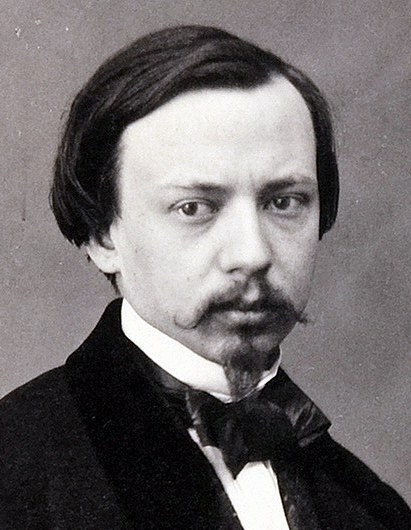
- Madrazo, c.1855-1860
- Born: Luis de Madrazo y Kuntz; 27 February 1825; Madrid, Spain
- Died: 9 February 1897 (aged 71); Madrid, Spain
- Education: Real Academia de Bellas Artes de San Fernando; Accademia di San Luca, Rome; French Academy, Rome
- Awards: Commander in the Order of Isabel the Catholic

Luis de Madrazo y Kuntz (27 February 1825 – 9 February 1897) was a Spanish painter of portraits and religious scenes from a well-known family that included his father José (a painter), and his brothers Federico (also a painter), Pedro (an art critic) and Juan (an architect). His Polish grandfather Tadeusz Kuntze was a painter as well.

== Biography ==
He was born in Madrid, into a highly regarded family of artists. His father was José de Madrazo, and his brothers were Federico de Madrazo and Pedro de Madrazo. His nephews Raimundo de Madrazo y Garreta and Ricardo de Madrazo both became notable painters. The Madrazo family have been described as one of the most important painting dynasties, who literally dominated 19th-century painting in Spain.

He and his brothers received their first art lessons in their father's studio. Later, he entered the Real Academia de Bellas Artes de San Fernando. In 1845, he found employment as an illustrator for the magazine Seminario Pintoresco Español. Several years later, he received a fellowship that enabled him to complete his studies in Rome and improve his style. At first, he attended the Accademia di San Luca, then enrolled at the French Academy in Rome at the Villa Medici. While there, he met Friedrich Overbeck and came under the influence of the Nazarene movement.

Following his studies in Rome, he toured Europe, living briefly in Paris, Munich, Venice and Berlin. In the early 1890s, he settled for a time in Pompeii with two of his fellow painters from Spain. He returned to Madrid when the influence of his father and older brothers had gained him entry into that city's artistic circles, leading to the belief that his success was due entirely to his family's reputation.

During this final period of his life, he primarily devoted himself to teaching and painting portraits of the nobility. He received the rank of Commander in the Order of Isabel the Catholic and eventually became Director of the "Escuela Superior de Pintura, Escultura y Grabado de Madrid". Upon his death, in his home city of Madrid, he was succeeded by Dióscoro Puebla.

== Selected paintings ==
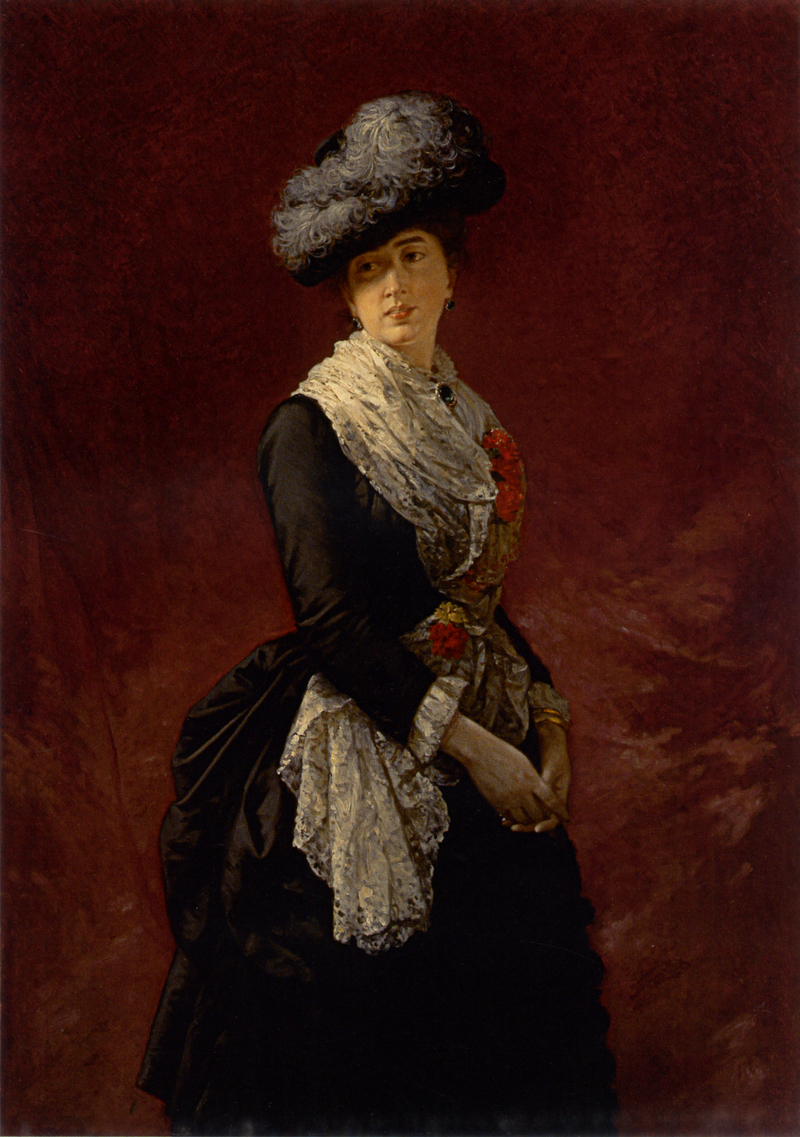
Cecilia de Madrazo

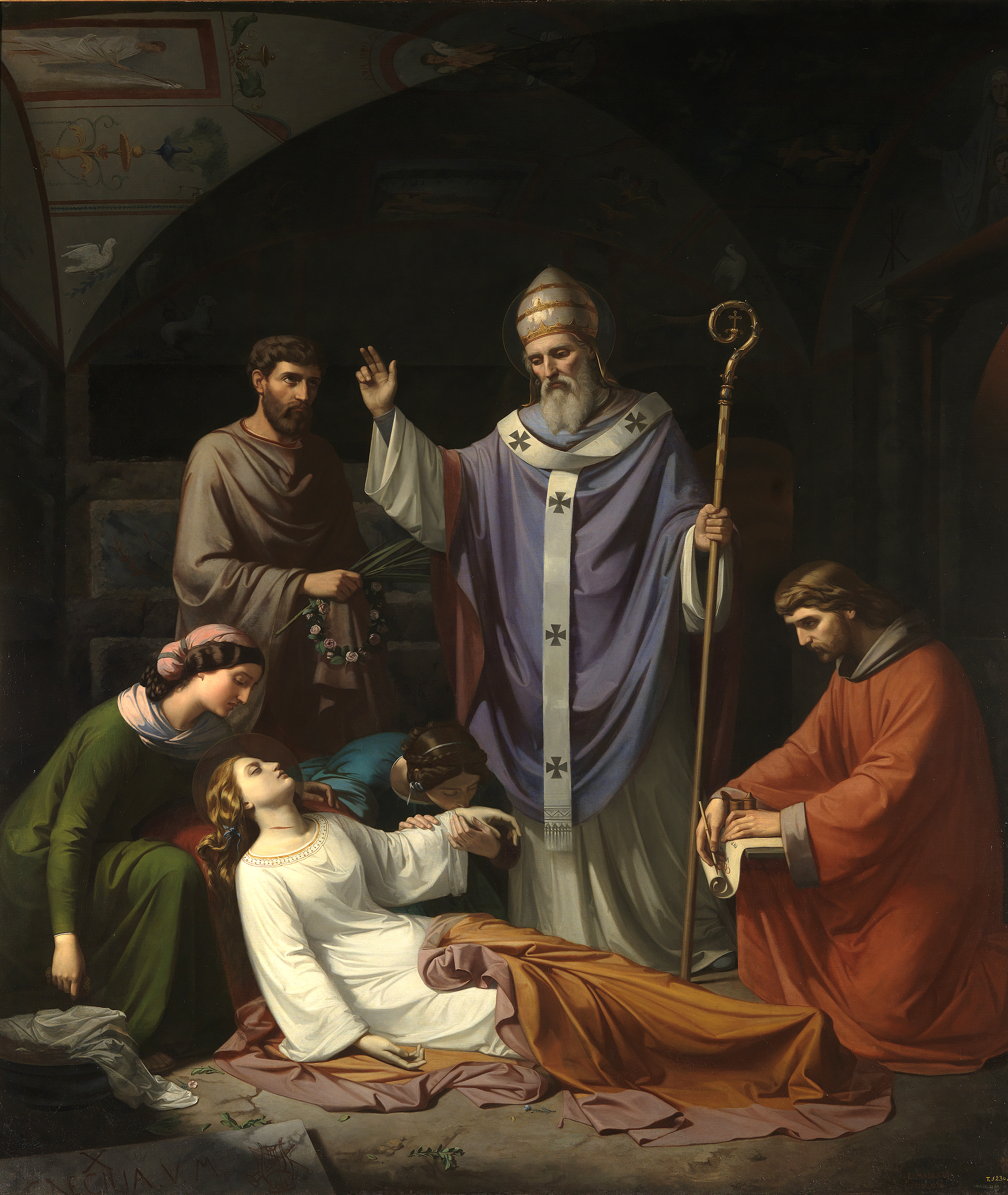
Interment of Saint Cecilia in the Roman Catacombs

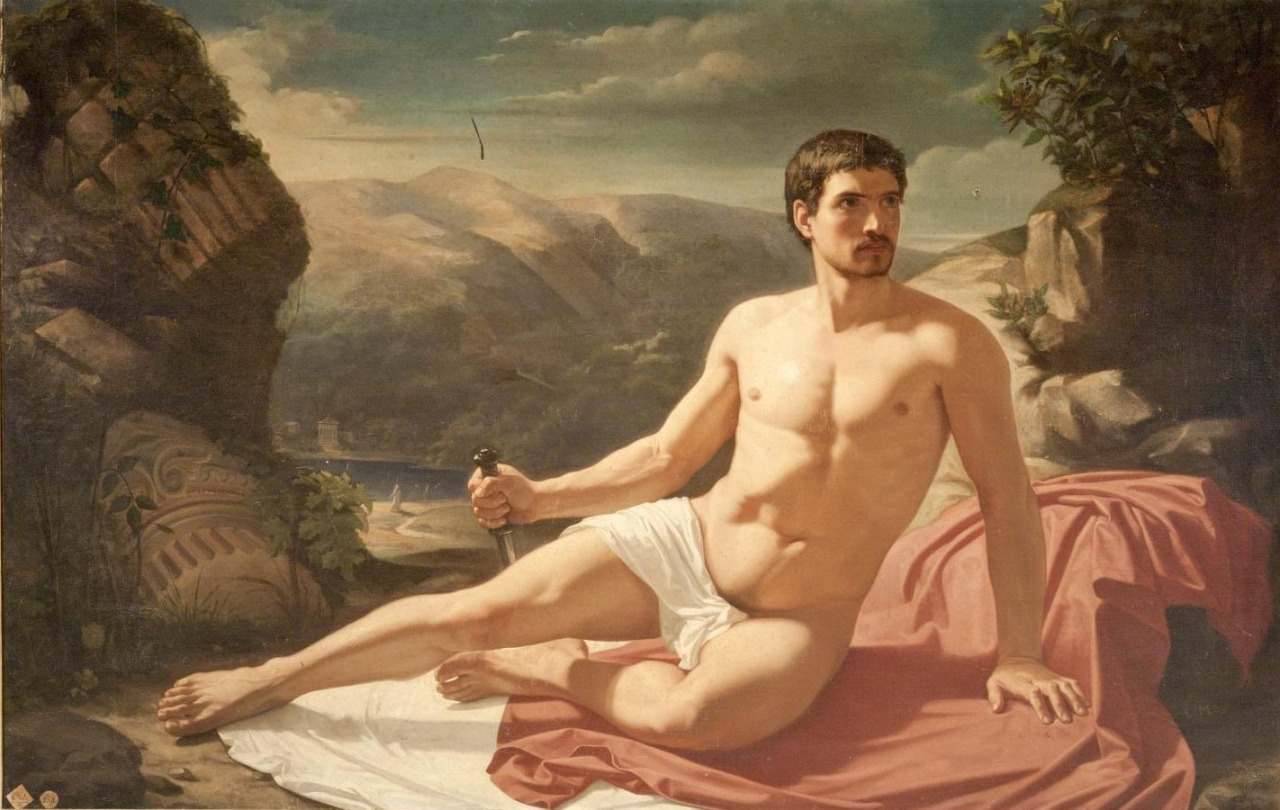
Man Holding a Dagger

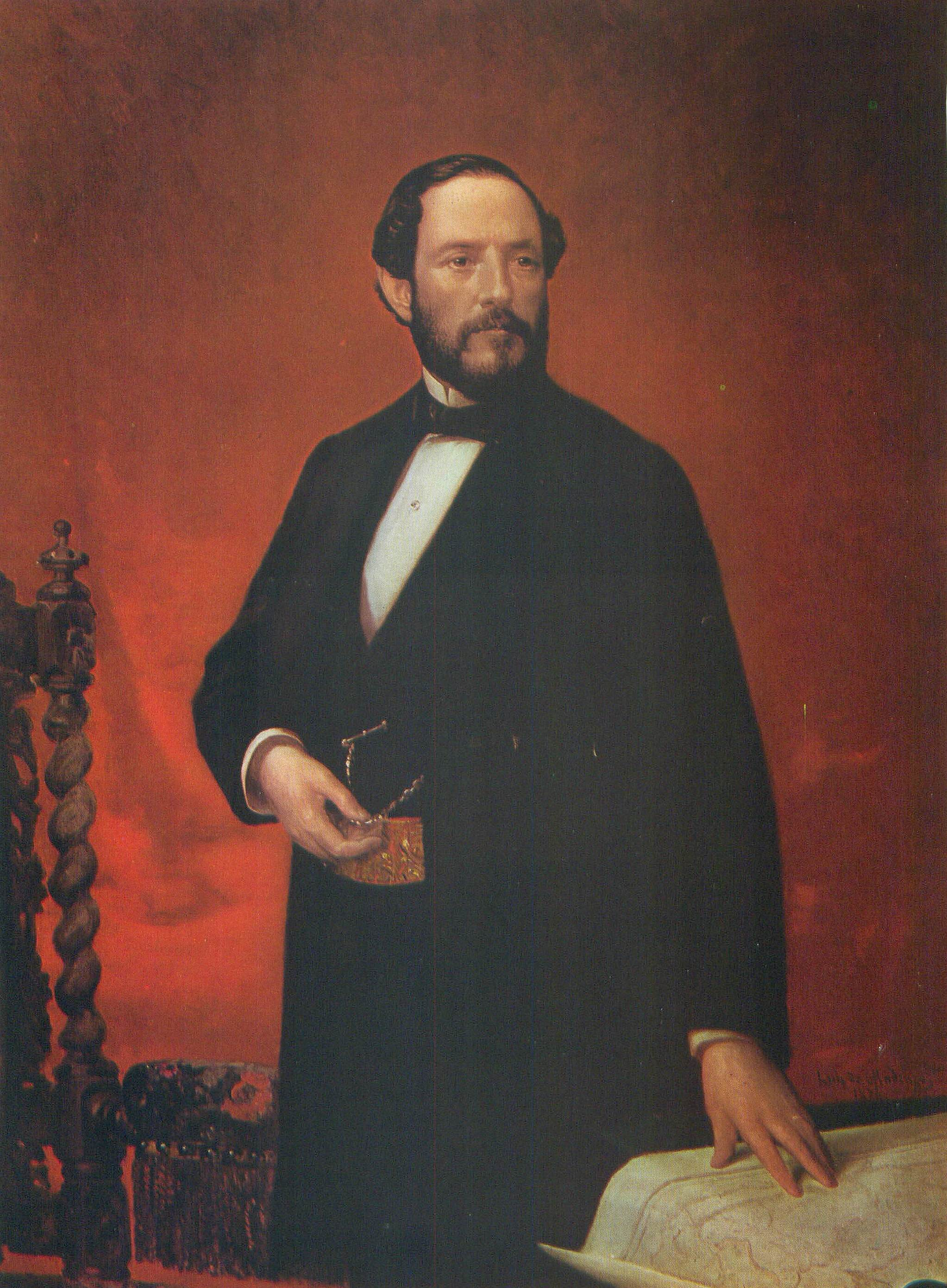
Juan Prim
