= Amalia de Llano =

Spanish countess and writer

Amalia de Llano Countess of Vilches, Viscountess of La Cervanta
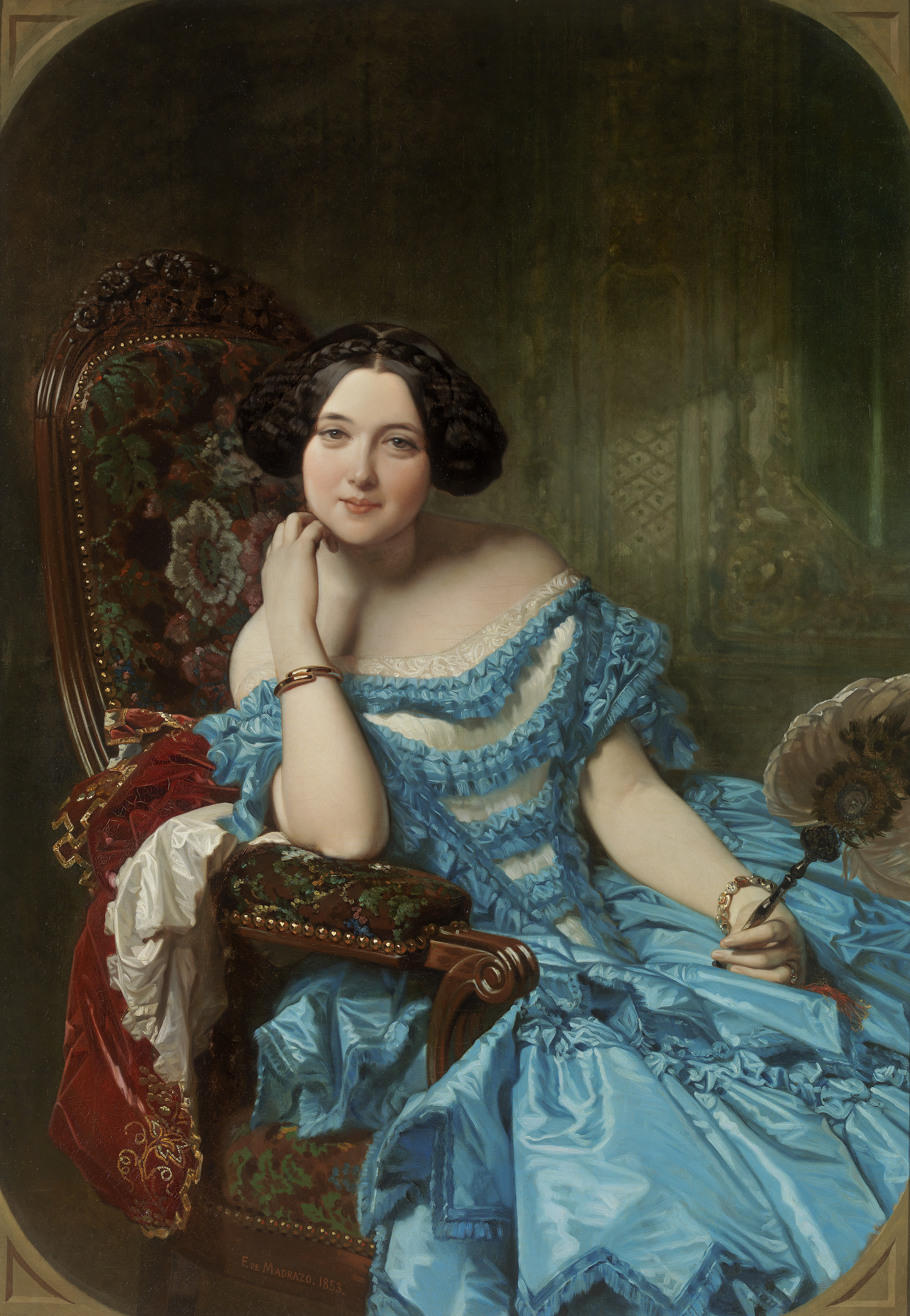
- Portrait (Amalia de Llano y Dotres, condesa de Vilches) by Federico de Madrazo, 1853

Personal details
- Born: Amalia Teresa Ramona de Llano y Dotres Chávarri y Gibert; 29 April 1822 Barcelona
- Died: 6 July 1874 (aged 52) Madrid
- Resting place: Cemetery of Saint Isidore
- Spouse(s): Gonzalo José de Vilches y Parga, Count of Vilches
- Children: Gonzalo de Vilches y Llano; Pilar de Vilches y Llano
- Parents: Ramón de Llano y Chávarri (father); Pilar Dotres y Gibert (mother)

Amalia de Llano, Countess of Vilches, Viscountess of La Cervanta (29 April 1822 – 6 July 1874) was a Spanish countess and writer. She was an important figure in the cultural life of Madrid in the 19th century. She was also, by marriage, Countess of Vilches and Viscountess of La Cervanta.

== Biography ==
Amalia de Llano was the daughter of Ramón de Llano y Chávarri and Pilar Dotres y Gibert; she was born in 1822, in Barcelona, into a wealthy family of the commercial bourgeoisie. After the death of her father, her mother married Francisco Falcó y Valcárcel, IX Marquis of Almonacid de los Oteros. This connection meant for the family the opening to life in aristocratic circles.

Amalia was married on 12 October 1839 to Gonzalo Vilches y Parga (1808–1879). The couple had two children:

- Gonzalo Vilches y Llano (Madrid, 13 June 1842 – Madrid, 2 February 1918), 2nd Count of Vilches and 2nd Viscount of La Cervanta, married 1879 to María San Juan y Mendinueta (? – 1927) Countess of Goyeneche and La Cimera.
- Pilar de Vilches y Llano.

On 8 December 1848, Queen Isabel II ennobled her husband Gonzalo, elevating him to the dignity of Count of Vilches; prior to ennoblement he had had the title of Viscount of La Cervanta, a nomenclature that made reference to one of their residences in the region of Castilla–La Mancha.

The Countess of Vilches participated and organized plays, as well as literary encounters much frequented by intellectual figures and artists of her time. A great fan of literature, she tried her hand as a writer and managed to publish two novels: Ledia and Berta; the latter saw the light the year she died. The painter Federico de Madrazo, who portrayed her in 1853, was part of her circle of friends. The countess herself paid 4,000 reales for the painting, half of what the artist was wont to charge. She is seated gracefully in a fine armchair, her youth and beauty accentuated by the dark background. The portrait is quite unlike a traditional Spanish portrait of the period. The Countess of Vilches unconditionally supported Isabel II, and was very favourable to the Bourbon Restoration which ended the First Spanish Republic by a coup d'état.

Amalia's death, which occurred on 6 July 1874 in Madrid, was deeply felt by Madrid society, as was reflected in the numerous articles that were dedicated to her in newspapers of the time. She was buried in the Saint Isidore Cemetery in Madrid, in the family vault of the Marquis of Almonacid de los Oteros, built in 1870 by the architect Wenceslao Gaviña Baquero. Next to her lie the mortal remains of her mother, her stepfather and her grandson Gonzalo, among others. Her husband, the Count of Vilches, died in 1879, and was buried in the same cemetery, although in a different section.
