= Pedro de Madrazo y Kuntz =

Spanish painter, jurist, writer, translator and art critic

The Most Excellent Pedro de Madrazo
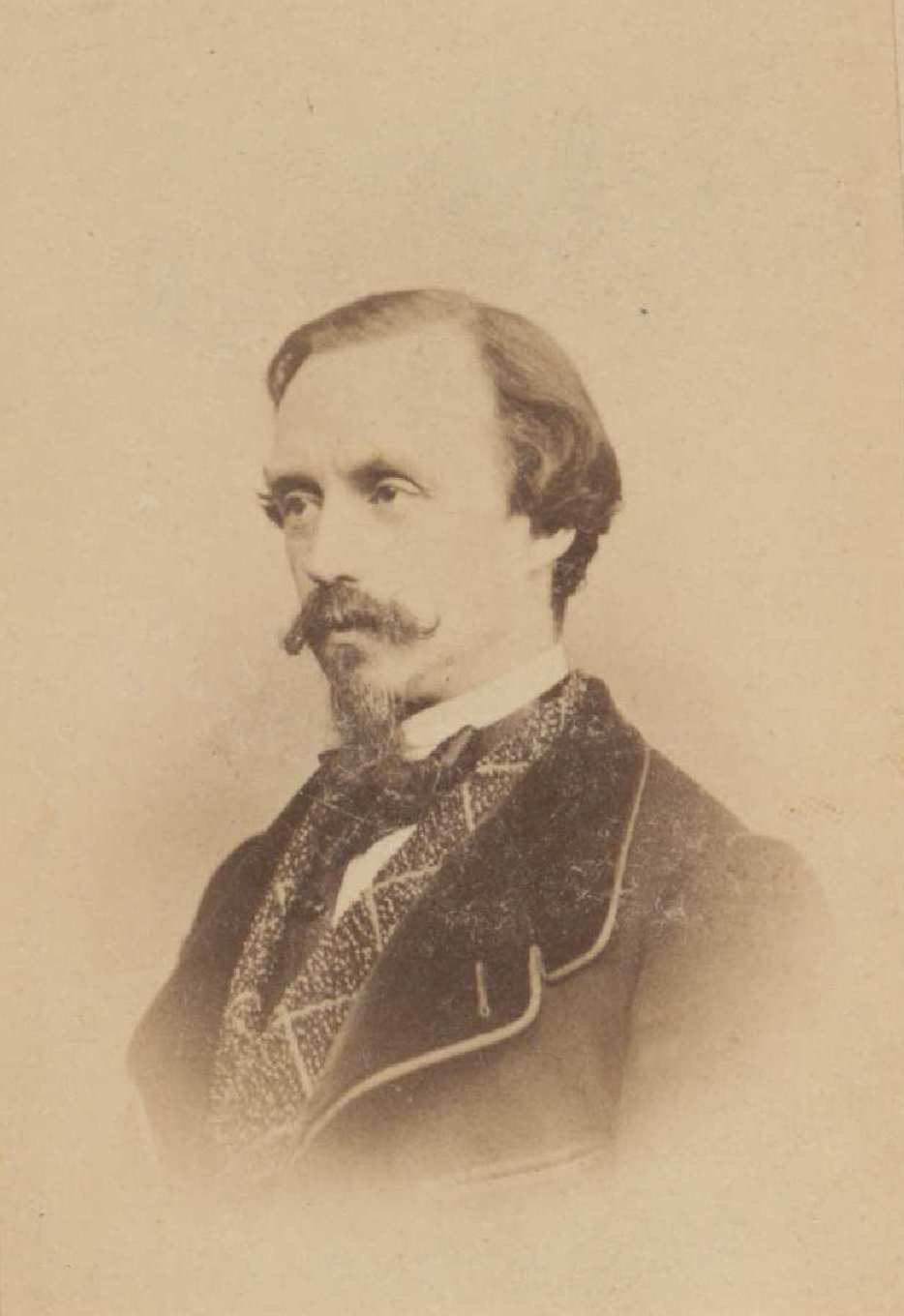
- de Madrazo; photograph by Jean Laurent
- Born: Pedro de Madrazo y Kuntz; 11 October 1816; Rome, Papal States (now Italy)
- Died: 20 August 1898 (aged 81); Madrid, Spain

Seat i of the Real Academia Española
- In office 10 April 1881 – 20 August 1898
- Preceded by: Antonio María Segovia
- Succeeded by: Emilio Cotarelo

Pedro de Madrazo y Kuntz (11 October 1816, Rome - 20 August 1898, Madrid) was a Spanish painter, jurist, writer, translator and art critic.

== Biography ==
He came from an illustrious family of artists. His father was the painter José de Madrazo y Agudo and his mother, Isabel Kuntz Valentini, was a daughter of the Polish painter, Tadeusz Kuntze. Two of his brothers, Federico de Madrazo and Luis de Madrazo were also painters. His sister, Carlota, married the editor of the journal, El Artista, Eugenio de Ochoa.

He and his brother Federico were born in Rome, while their father was studying there on a grant from King Charles IV. His primary education began in Madrid, at a seminary school operated by the Jesuits. This was followed by legal studies in Toledo and at the University of Valladolid, where he graduated. In 1837, he and Federico traveled to Paris, then back to Rome. Shortly after, he married Manuela Rosales, daughter of the painter, Eduardo Rosales. They had three daughters and a son. During this time, he worked as an art teacher.

Later, he moved to Madrid. There, he, his brother Federico and future brother-in-law, Ochoa, created the magazine, El Artista, which played a major role in establishing the Romantic style in Spain. He also contributed to most of the cultural publications of the day; including El Renacimiento, El Español, El Iris, La Cruz and La Ilustración Española y Americana. Later, he served as Editor of El Domingo, where he published verses in imitation of the Psalms and translations from the Bible.

He combined his journalistic career with legal service; as an assistant and a prosecutor, in which capacity he worked for the Spanish Council of State in 1860. From 1870 to 1871 and again from 1875 to 1880, he was that body's Secretary General. In 1888, he was a Minister with the "Tribunal de lo Contencioso Administrativo". He retired from his legal activities in 1897. Largely progressive in his youth, he became more conservative with age and, during the Restoration, belonged to the Conservative Party of Antonio Cánovas del Castillo.

In his role of art critic and historian, he promoted Gothic art as the most representative style and introduced the concept of art as an historical heritage. He also chaired a commission on the preservation of provincial historical monuments and wrote the catalogues for the Museo del Prado.

As a writer, he favored lyric poetry with a religiously moral emphasis and, occasionally, some patriotism. He also penned two theatrical pieces, a number of Cuadros de costumbres and some travel pieces. His major translations include Criminal Law and Political Economy, by Pellegrino Rossi, the Book of Orators, by Joseph-Marie Timon-David and History of the Consulate and Empire, by Adolphe Thiers.

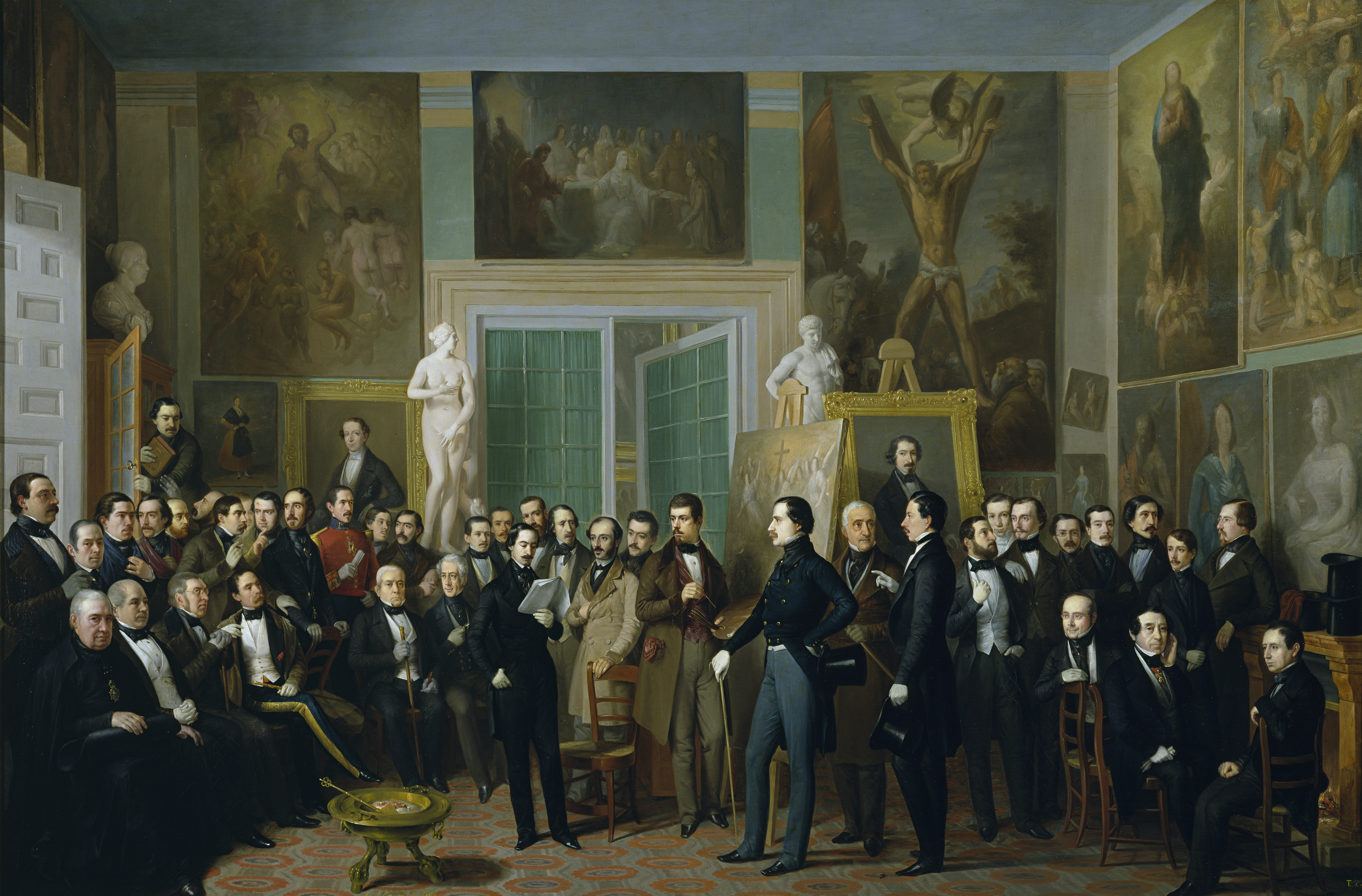
Meeting of Poets in the Artist's Studio, by Antonio María Esquivel. Madrazo is ninth from the right.

In his later life, he became director of the Museo de Arte Moderno and, in 1894, succeeded his brother Federico as director of the Real Academia de Bellas Artes de San Fernando, of which he had been a member since 1851. He was also a member of the Real Academia Española and the Real Academia de la Historia, where he served as secretary. He held honorary memberships in several institutions outside Spain.
