= Federico de Madrazo y Kuntz =

19th-century Spanish painter

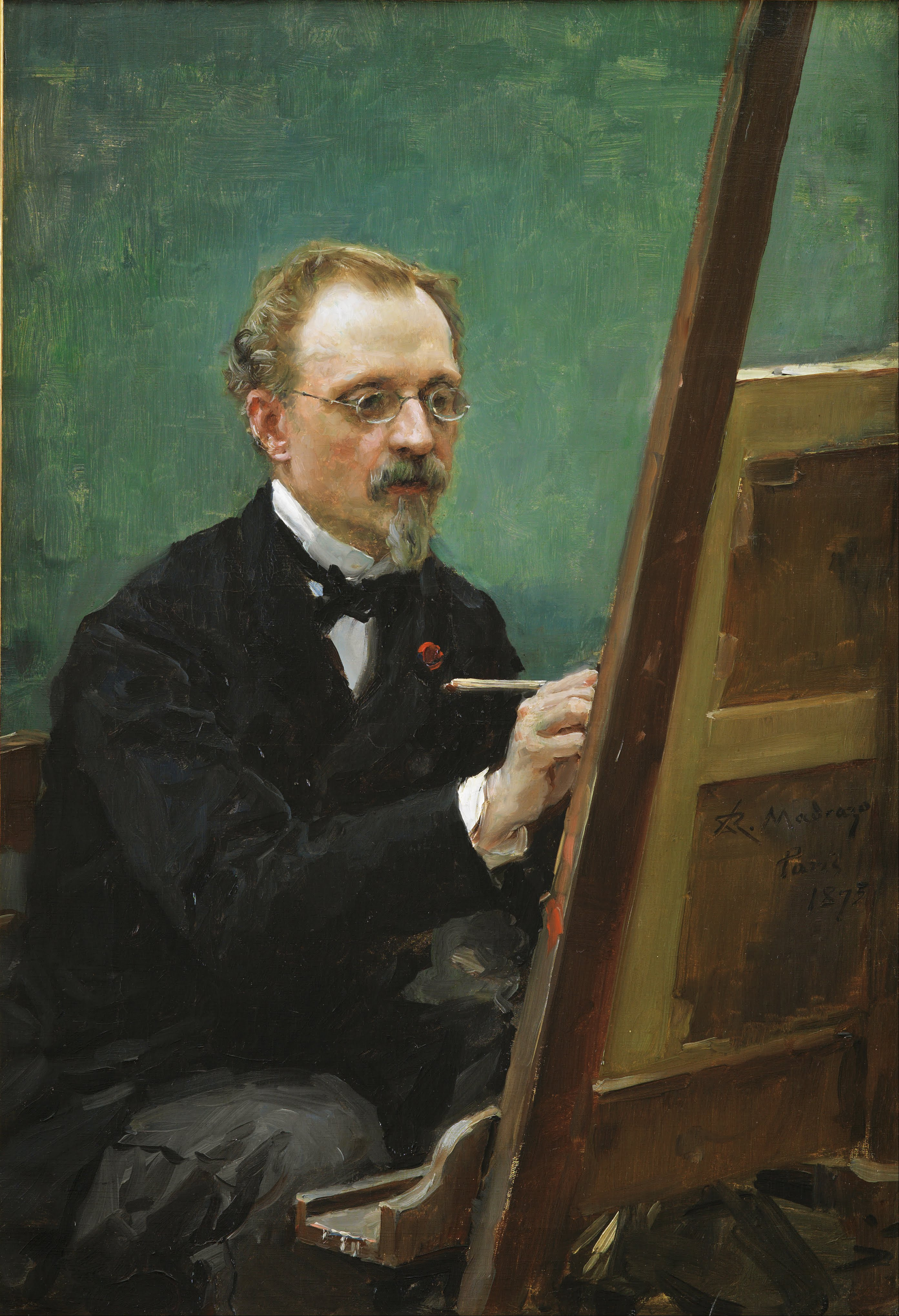
- Portrait by his son, Raimundo de Madrazo (1875)
- Born: 9 February 1815; Rome
- Died: 10 June 1894 (aged 79); Madrid
- Education: Royal Academy of San Fernando, Madrid
- Known for: Portraiture
- Style: Neoclassicism
- Awards: Legion of Honour; Académie des Beaux-Arts

Signature
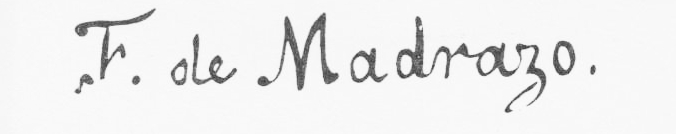

Federico de Madrazo y Kuntz (9 February 1815 – 10 June 1894) was a Spanish painter.

== Biography ==
Born in Rome, he was the son of José de Madrazo y Agudo, the painter and former Director of the Prado Museum, and Isabel Kuntz Valentini. Federico's grandfather on his mother side was Tadeusz Kuntze, a Polish painter. His brothers were Luis de Madrazo, a painter, Pedro de Madrazo, an art critic and Juan de Madrazo, an architect. Among his children were Ricardo de Madrazo, also a painter, Raimundo de Madrazo y Garreta and Cecilia de Madrazo who married the great Orientalist artist, Marià Fortuny. The Madrazo family have been described as one of the most important painting dynasties, who literally dominated 19th-century painting in Spain.

He received his first instruction from his father. While still attending the classes at the Royal Academy of San Fernando, he painted his first picture, The Resurrection of Christ (1829), which was purchased by Queen Christina. Not long afterwards he painted Achilles in his Tent, and subsequently presented to the academy The Continence of Scipio, which secured him admission as a member "for merit".

While decorating the palace of Vista Alegre he took up portraiture. In 1832 he went to Paris, where he studied under Franz Winterhalter, and painted portraits of Baron Taylor and Ingres. In 1837 he was commissioned to produce a picture for the gallery at Versailles, and painted "Godfrey de Bouillon proclaimed King of Jerusalem". The artist then returned to Rome, where he worked at various subjects, sacred and profane. Then he painted Maria Christina in the Dress of a Nun by the Bedside of Ferdinand III (1843), Queen Isabella, The Duchess of Medinaceli, and The Countess de Vilches (1845–47), besides a number of portraits of the Spanish aristocracy, some of which were sent to the exhibition of 1855.

He received the Legion of Honour in 1846. He was made a corresponding member of the Académie des Beaux-Arts on 10 December 1853, and in 1873, on the death of Schnorr, the painter, he was chosen foreign member. Three years after his father left office, he also became Director of the Museo del Prado and president of the Academy of San Fernando. He originated in Spain the production of art reviews and journals, such as El Artista, El Renacimiento, and El Semanario pintoresco. He died in Madrid.

His brother, Luis de Madrazo, was also known as a painter, chiefly by his Burial of Saint Cecilia (1855). Federico's best-known pupils were his sons, Raimundo and Ricardo.

== Selected paintings ==
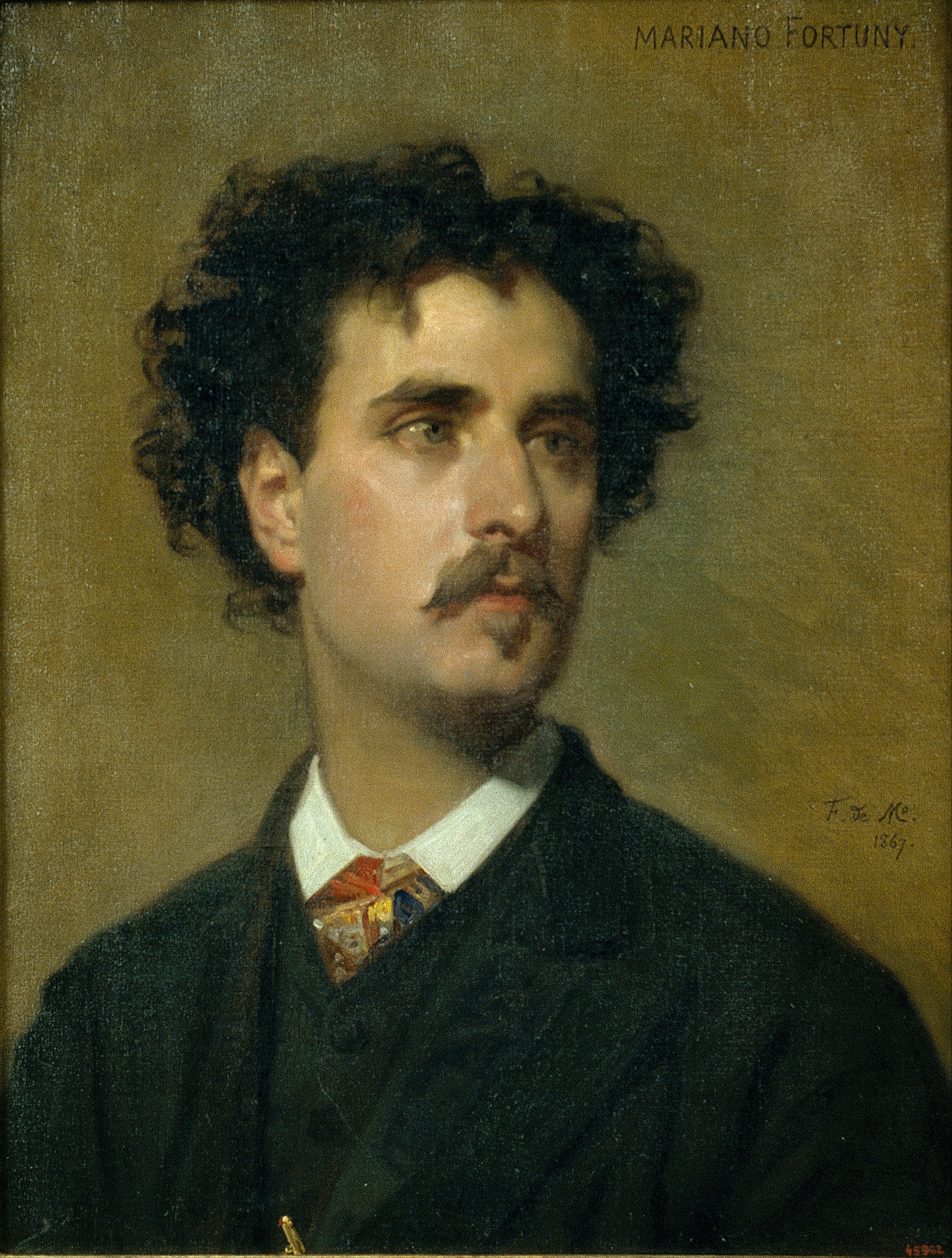
Marià Fortuny (1867)

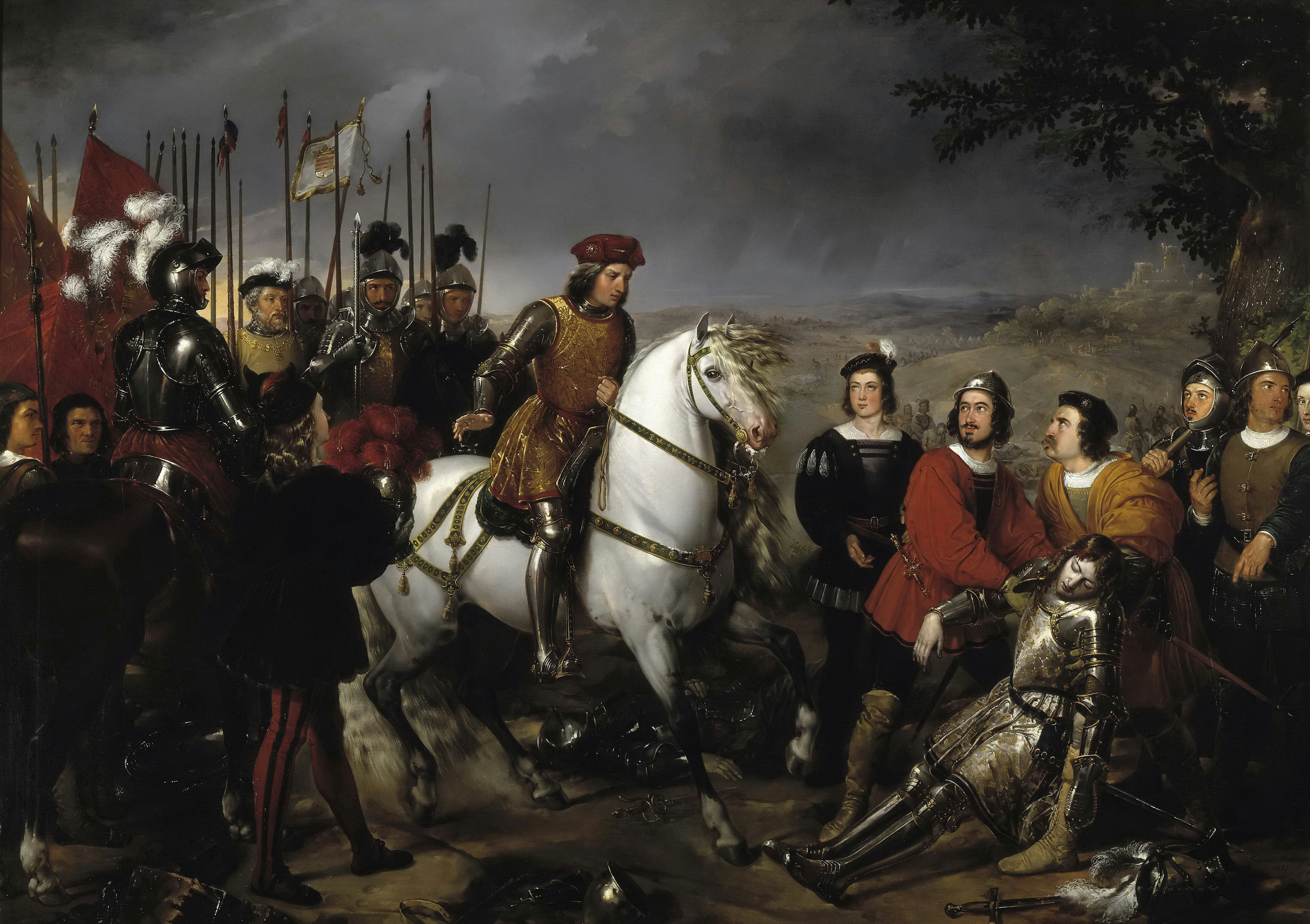
Battle of Cerignola: El Gran Capitan finds the corpse of Louis d'Armagnac, Duke of Nemours (1835)

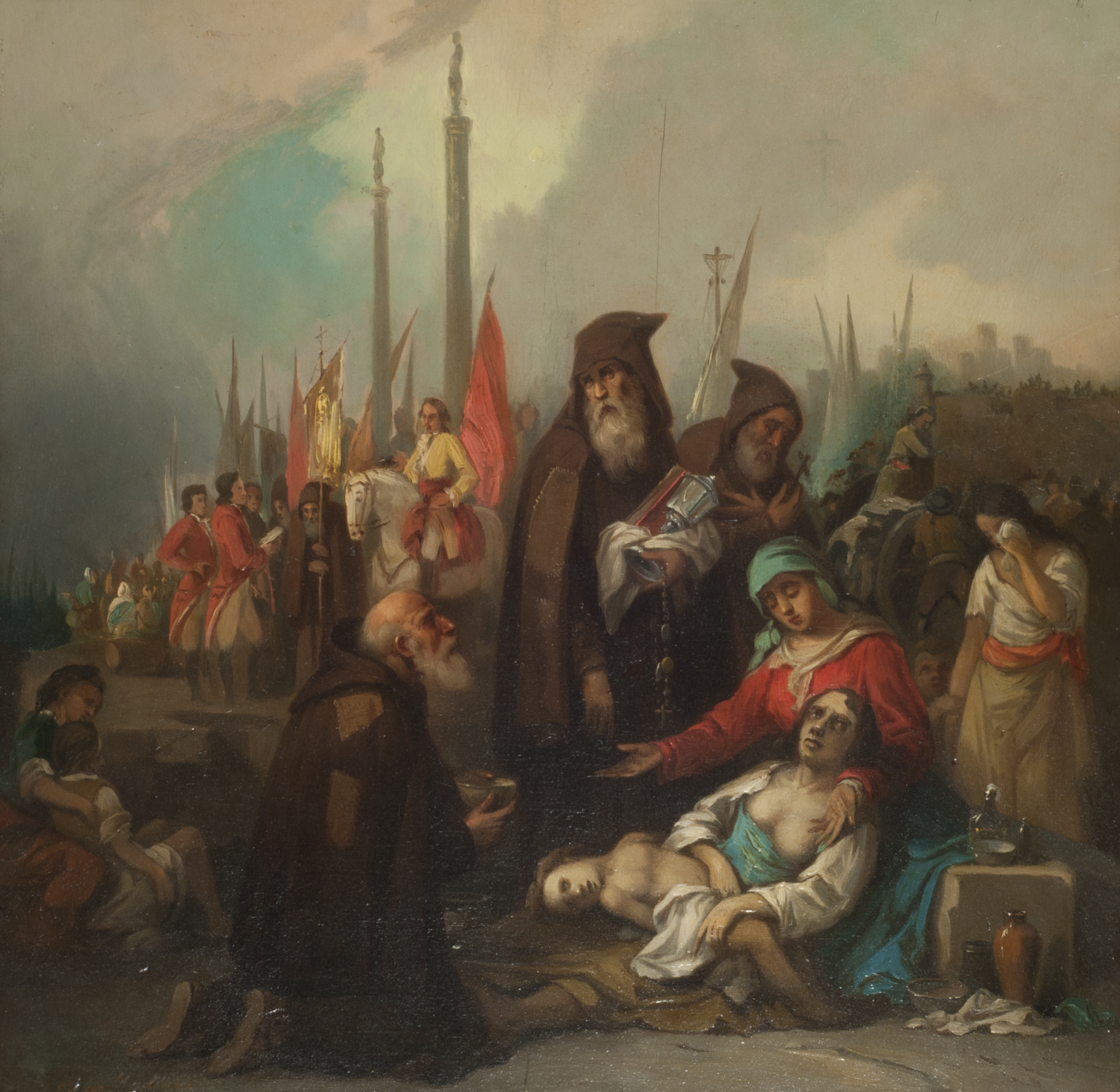
Helping the Afflicted (1840)

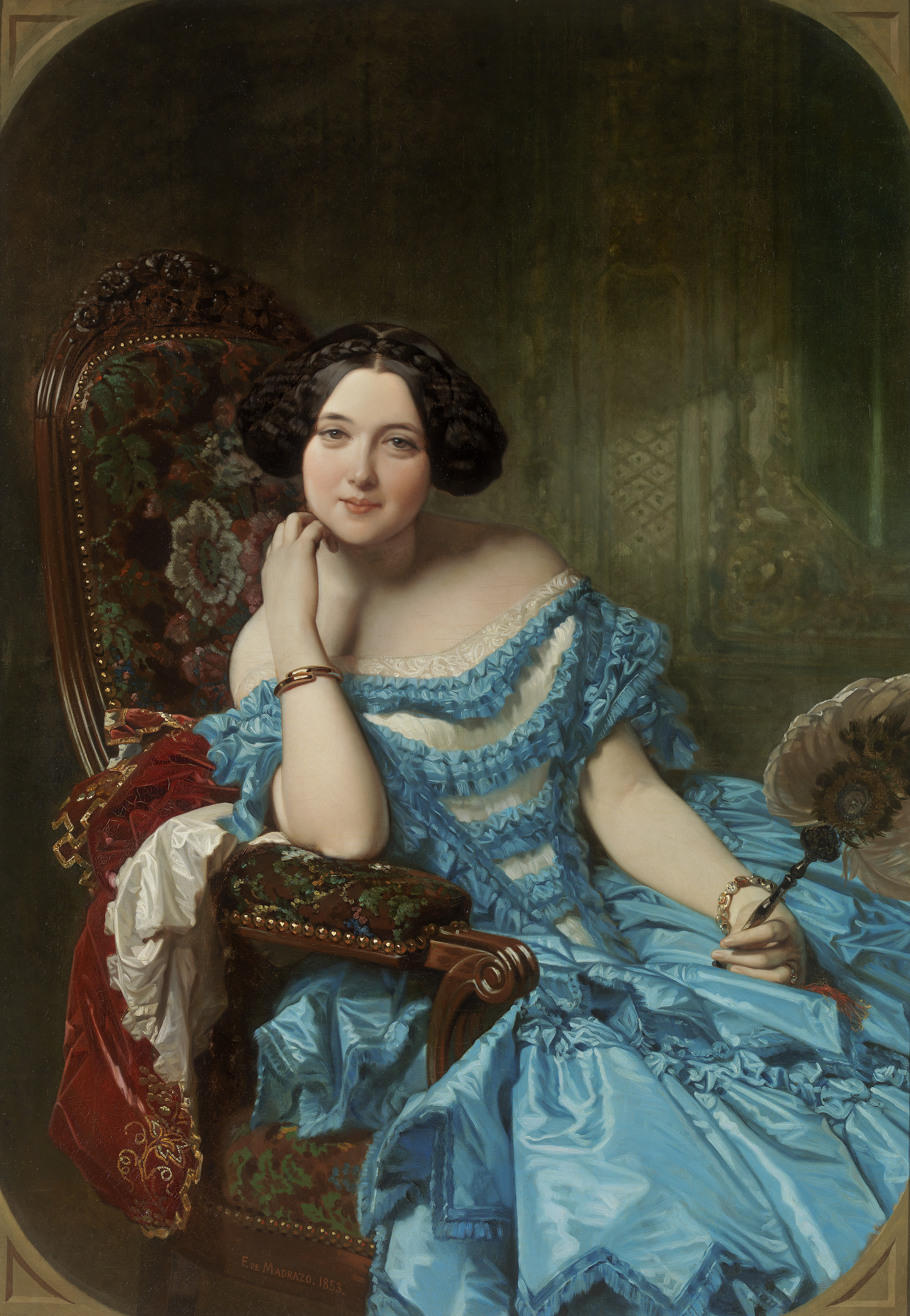
The Countess of Vilches (1853)
