= Eugenio de Ochoa =

Spanish writer and translator (1815–1872)

The Most Excellent Eugenio de Ochoa
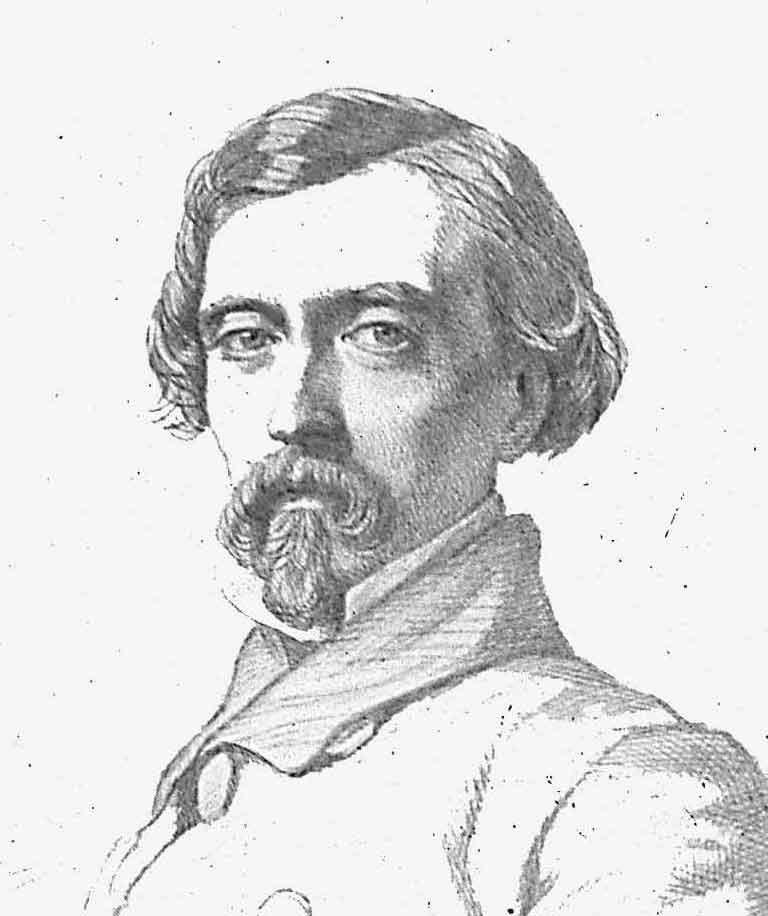
- Born: Eugenio de Ochoa Montel; 19 April 1815; Lezo, Spain
- Died: 28 February 1872 (aged 56); Madrid, Spain

Seat h of the Real Academia Española
- In office 25 February 1847 – 28 February 1872
- Preceded by: Seat established
- Succeeded by: Luis Fernández-Guerra y Orbe

Eugenio de Ochoa Montel (19 April 1815 – 28 February 1872) was a Spanish author, writer, and translator.
