= Juan de Madrazo =

Spanish architect (1829–1880)

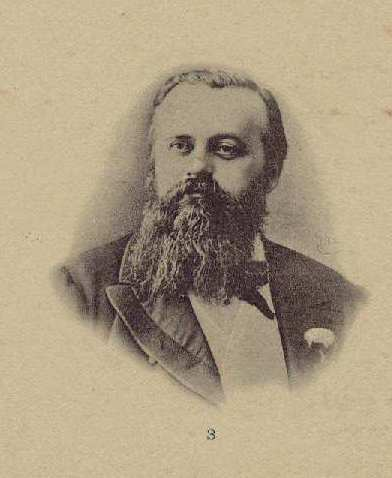
Juan de Madrazo (date unknown)

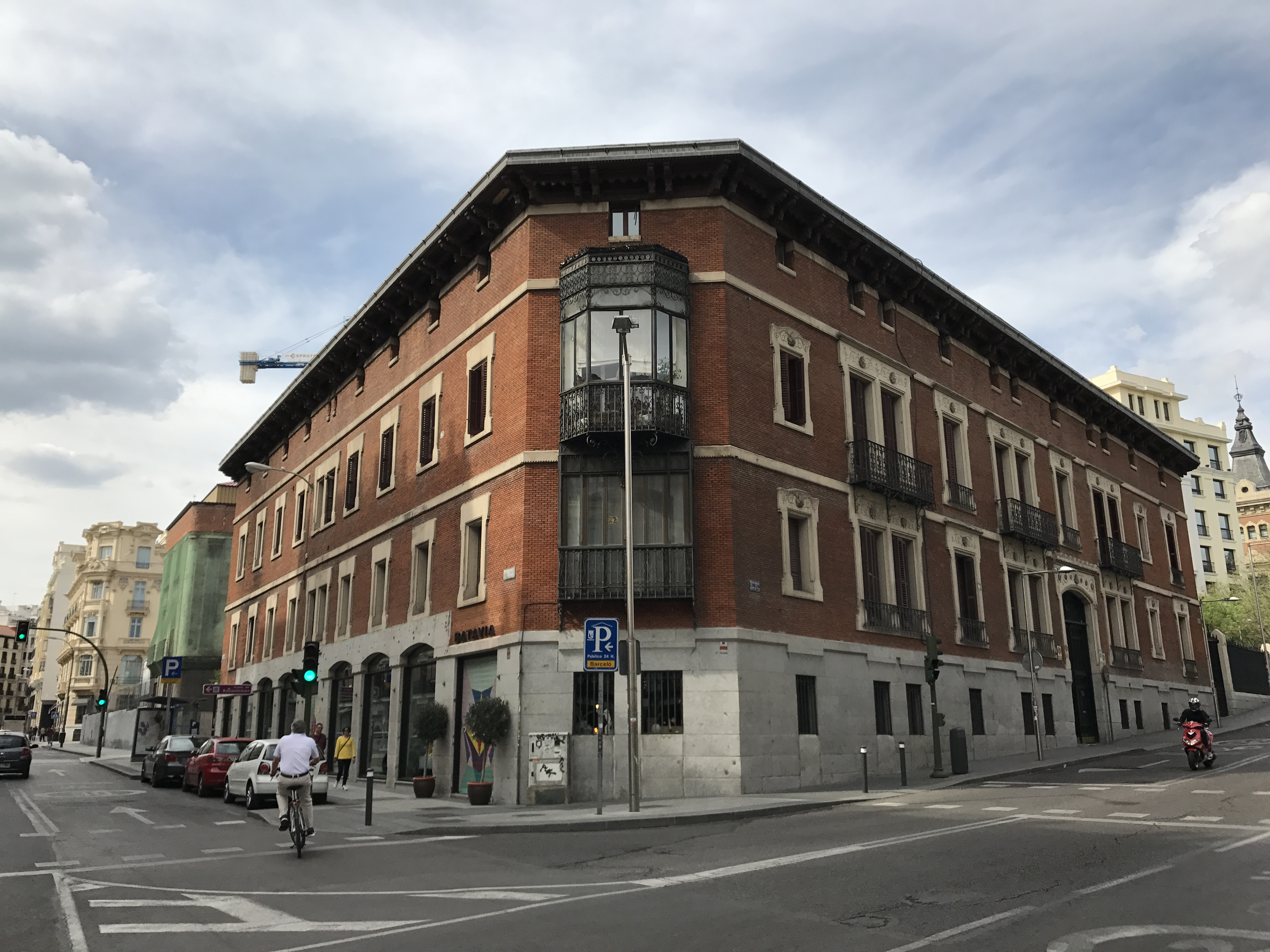
The Palace of Count Villagonzalo

Juan de Madrazo y Kuntz (1829, Madrid - 7 March 1880, Madrid) was a Spanish architect and restoration expert.

== Life and work ==
He came from a family of illustrious painters. His father was the portrait painter, José Madrazo. His brothers were the painters Federico de Madrazo and Luis de Madrazo. In what may have been an effort to stand out, he chose architecture over painting; becoming an apprentice at the Palacio Real de Madrid; under the direction of Domingo Lafuente, the official Palace Architect. He remained with Lafuente until, in 1846, he was able to become a student at the recently established School of Architecture.

After obtaining his degree in 1852, he held a Chair at the "School of Construction Masters" in Valencia, where he taught composition and legal issues. In 1854, he returned to Madrid. There, he wrote a book on surveying and began another on popular architecture. In 1855, he became involved in an ambitious project to renovate the Puerta del Sol, but it never came to fruition.

He was one of the few architects in Madrid who designed buildings in the International Style, as developed by the French architect, Eugène Viollet-le-Duc. Many restoration projects were placed under his direction; perhaps the best known being the exterior decorations on the Church of Las Calatravas. He performed similar work on the León Cathedral, for which he was posthumously awarded a medal of honor at the National Exhibition of Fine Arts in 1881.

He died of a sudden, severe illness in 1880, at the age of fifty-one. His career was relatively short, so few examples of his original designs are in existence.
