= Tadeusz Kuntze =

Polish painter (1727–1793)

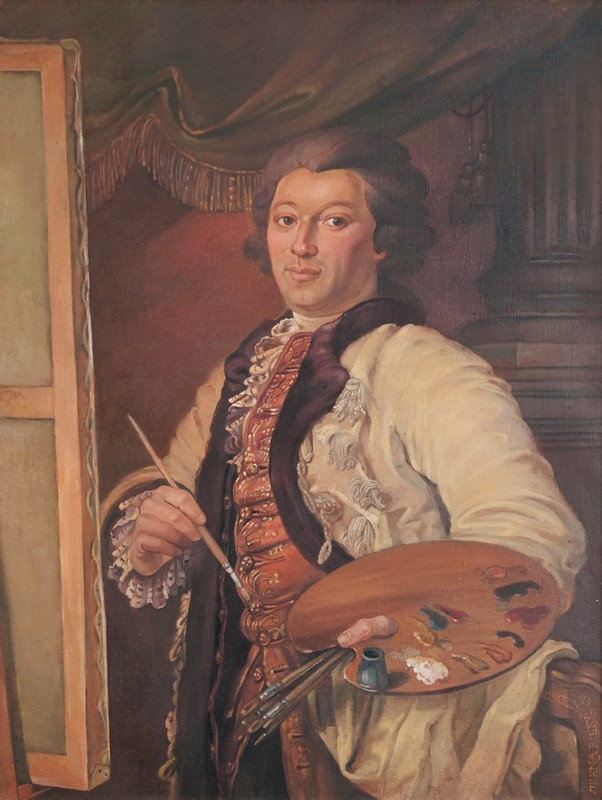
- Portrait of Kuntze by Irena Bierwiaczonek: Museo Ziemi Lubuskiej, Zielona Góra, Poland
- Born: Tadeusz Konicz; 3 October 1733; Grünberg, Silesia
- Died: 8 May 1793 (aged 59); Rome, Italy
- Education: Académie de France, Rome; Scuola libera del nudo, Rome

Tadeusz Kuntze (also Taddeo Kuntze or Taddeo Polacco) was the pseudonym of the Polish-Silesian painter Tadeusz Konicz (3 October 1733 – 8 May 1793), who was active in Kraków, in Paris, in Spain and in Rome.

== Life ==
Konicz was born in Grünberg, Silesia (now Zielona Góra, Poland) on 3 October 1733. He was raised in Kraków at the court of the bishop, Andrzej Stanisław Załuski, who in 1747 sent him to Rome to study. From 1748 to 1752 he studied at the Académie de France, and later under Ludovico Mazzanti and at the newly established scuola libera del nudo. He painted a number of works in Poland in 1754, including altarpieces of St Adalbert and of St Casimir in Kraków Cathedral, and the Fortune now in the National Museum, Warsaw. In 1756 he travelled to Paris, and in 1757 was again in Kraków at the court of Załuski. After Załuski's death in late 1758, Kuntze went to Spain. By 1766 he was again in Rome. Among his patrons there were the Borghese princes, for whom he worked at both Palazzo Borghese and Villa Borghese, and Henry Benedict Stuart, then bishop of Frascati, for whom he executed frescoes in the Seminario Tuscolano and in the Palazzo Vescovile (the bishop's palace). He also worked on frescoes in the church of Santo Stanislao dei Polacchi.

Kuntze died in Rome on 8 May 1793.

== Works ==
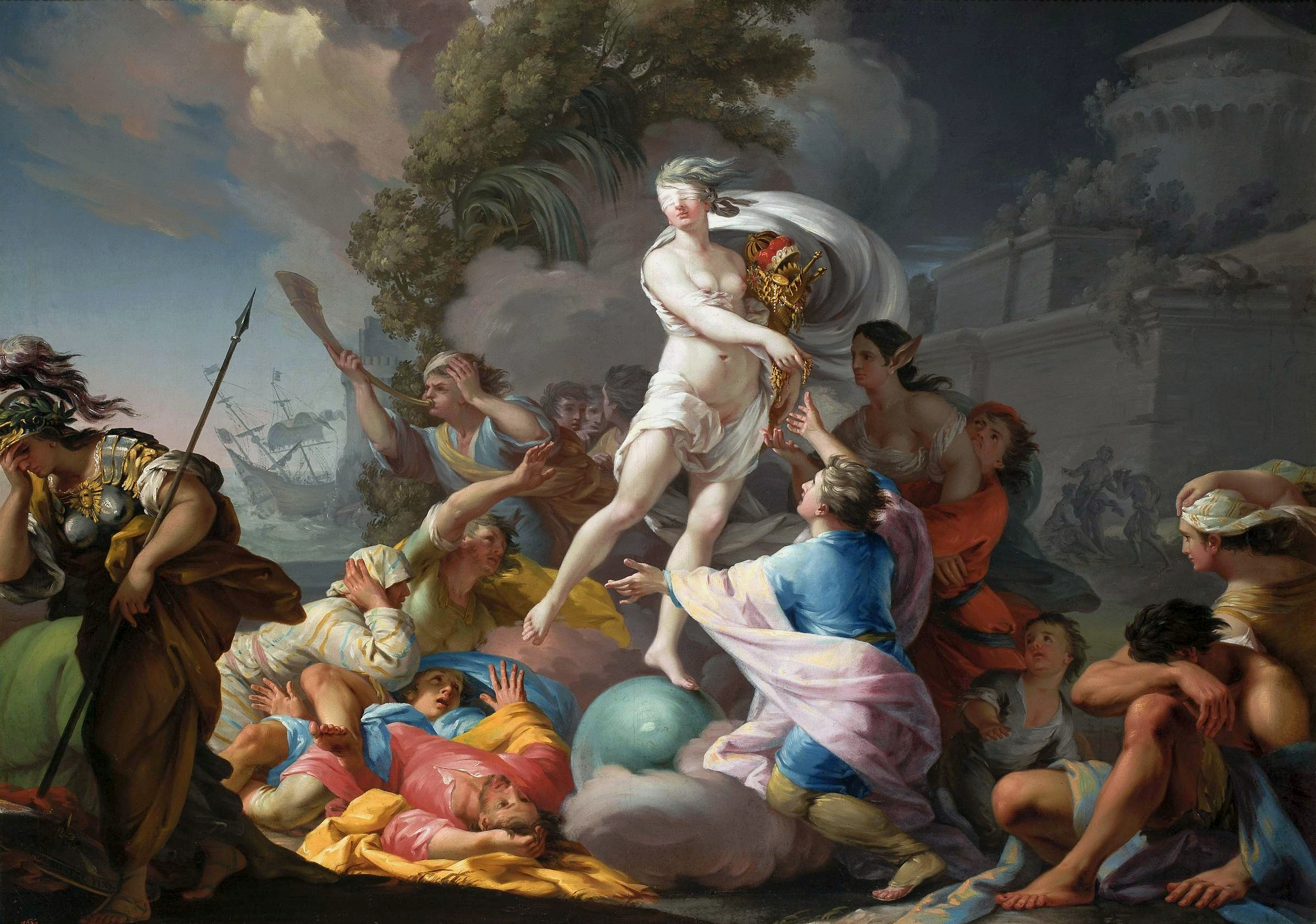
Fortune, oil on canvas: National Museum, Warsaw

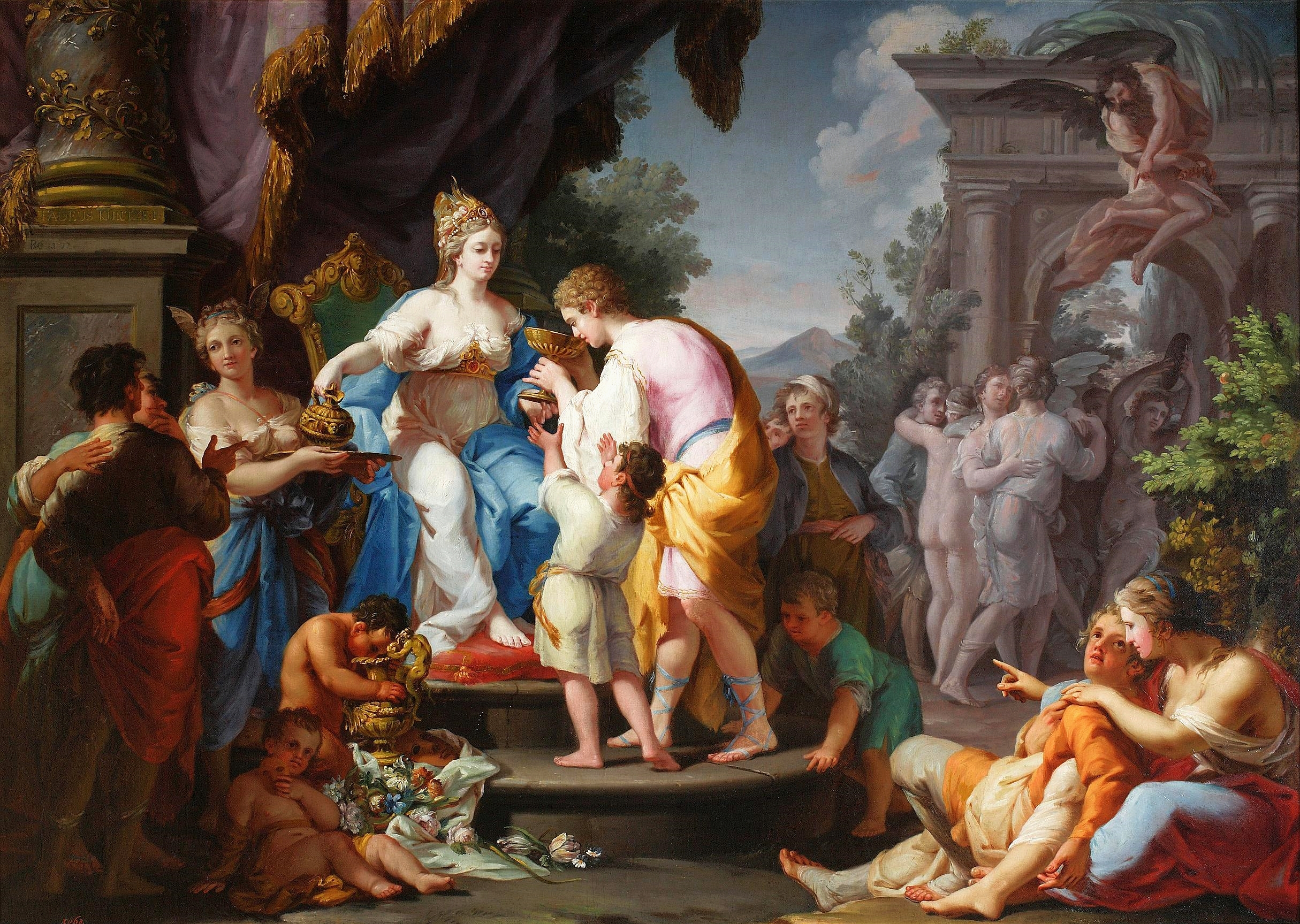
Art, oil on canvas: National Museum, Warsaw

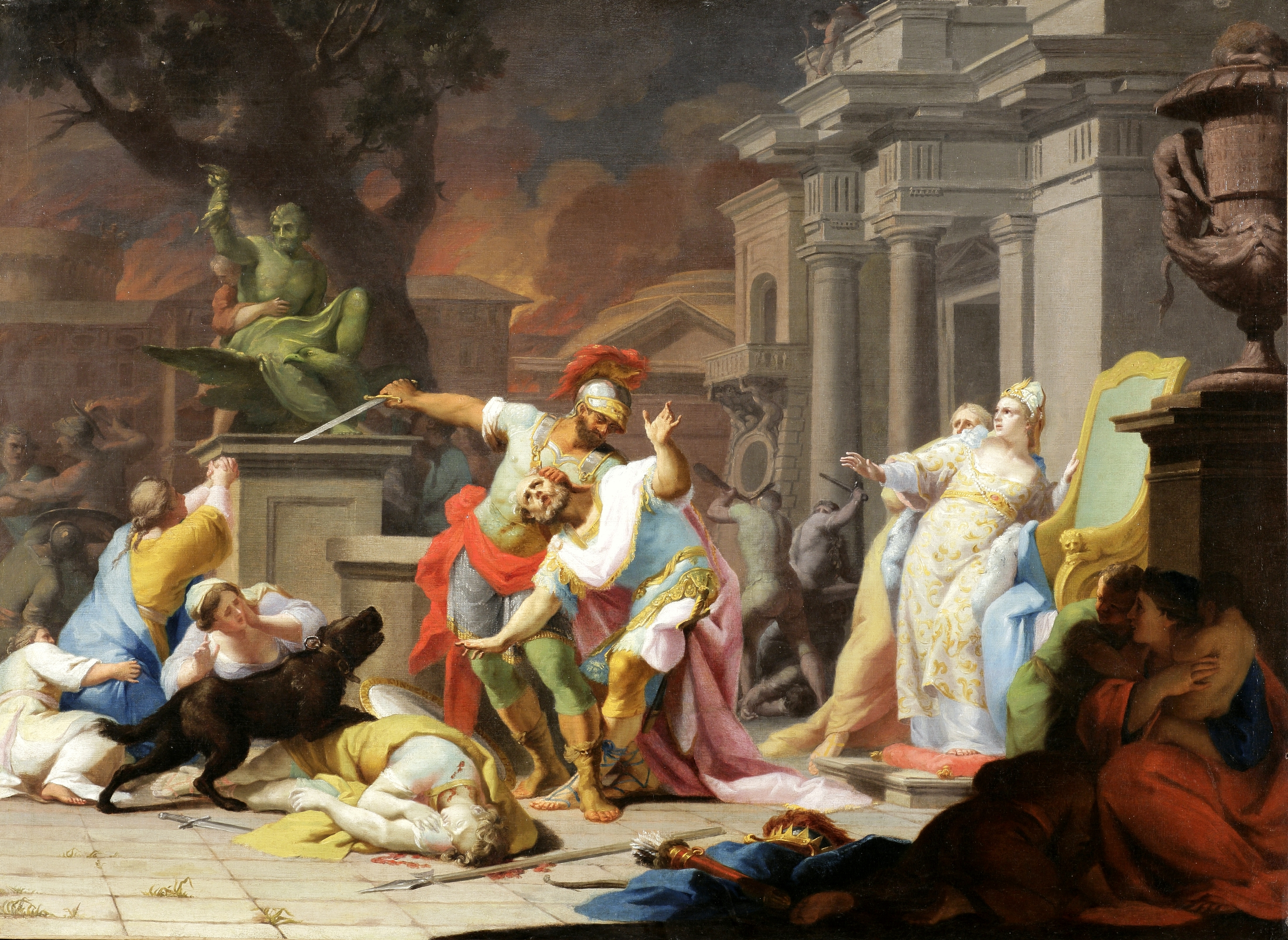
Death of Priam, oil on canvas: Wawel Castle
