= Fortuny =

Fortuny (Eastern Catalan: [fuɾˈtuɲ]) is a surname of Catalan origin. It may refer to:

- Amparo Fortuny, Spanish filmmaker
- Diego Fortuny (born 1991), Argentine rugby union player
- José Manuel Fortuny (1916–2005), Guatemalan Communist leader
- Juan Fortuny (1946–2024), Spanish swimmer
- Mariano Fortuny (painter) (1835–1874), Spanish painter
- Mariano Fortuny (designer) (1871–1949), Spanish fashion designer and lighting engineer, son of the painter
- Pol Fortuny (born 2005), Spanish footballer

== See also ==
- Fortuny Museum, Venice, Italy
- Palazzo Fortuny or Palazzo Pesaro Orfei, palace in Venice, Italy
