= Palazzo Pesaro =

Palazzo Pesaro may refer to any one of a number of Venetian palaces of the Pesaro family:

- Ca' Pesaro, on the Grand Canal in the sestiere of Santa Croce
- The Fondaco dei Turchi, on the Grand Canal in the sestiere of Santa Croce
- Palazzo Pesaro Orfei, in the sestiere of San Marco
- Palazzo Pesaro Papafava, in the sestiere of Cannaregio
- Palazzo Ravà, on the Grand Canal in the sestiere of San Polo
