= Pleat =

Deliberate fold in the design of a textile object or garment

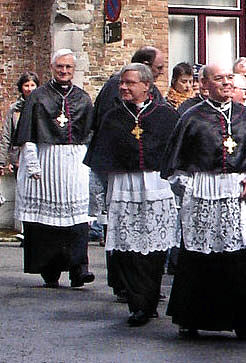
Catholic clergymen wearing pleated rochets

A pleat (plait in older English) is a type of fold formed by doubling fabric back upon itself and securing it in place. It is commonly used in clothing and upholstery to narrow a wide piece of fabric through gathering.

Pleats are categorized as pressed, that is, ironed or otherwise heat-set into a sharp crease, or unpressed, falling in soft rounded folds. Pleats sewn into place are called tucks.

== Types ==
=== Accordion ===
Knife pleat

Accordion pleats are a variation of knife pleats that feature tighter pleating, which creates a zigzag pattern close to the hem and allows the garment to expand its shape when moving. Accordion pleating is also used for some dress sleeves, such as pleating the end of the elbow, with the fullness of the pleat gathered closely at the cuff. This form of pleating inspired the "skirt dancing" of Loie Fuller. Accordion pleats may also be used in hand fans.

=== Box ===
Box pleats

Double box pleats

Box pleats are knife pleats back-to-back, and have a tendency to spring out from the waistline. They have the same 3:1 ratio as knife pleats, and may also be stacked to form "stacked-" or "double-box pleats". These stacked box pleats create more fullness and have a 5:1 ratio. They also create a bulkier seam. Inverted box pleats have the "box" on the inside rather than the outside. This pleat was 'invented' in 1984 by Hana Havelova-Vanek (immigrant from Prague, CZ) for use in women's golf and tennis wear (and sold worldwide under the labels Hanasport & Golf Couture). Contrasting colors and fabrics can be hidden by a box pleat that create accents and highlights during movement of the garment.

=== Cartridge ===
Cartridge pleats

Cartridge pleats are used to gather a large amount of fabric into a small waistband or armscye without adding bulk to the seam. This type of pleating also allows the fabric of the skirt or sleeve to spring out from the seam. During the 15th and 16th centuries, this form of pleating was popular in the garments of men and women. Fabric is evenly gathered using two or more lengths of basting stitches, and the top of each pleat is whipstitched onto the waistband or armscye. Cartridge pleating was resurrected in 1840s fashion to attach the increasingly full bell-shaped skirts to the fashionable narrow waist.

=== Fluted ===
Fluted pleats or "flutings" are very small, rounded or pressed pleats used as trimmings. The name comes from their resemblance to a pan flute.

=== Fortuny ===
Fortuny pleats are crisp pleats set in silk fabrics by designer Mariano Fortuny in the early 20th century, using a secret pleat-setting process which is still not understood.

=== Honeycomb ===
Honeycomb pleats are narrow, rolled pleats used as a foundation for smocking.

=== Kick ===
Kick pleats are short pleats leading upwards from the bottom hem of garments such as skirts or coats, usually at the back. They allow the garment to drape straight down when stationary while also allowing freedom of movement.

=== Kingussie ===
Kingussie pleats

Kingussie pleats, named after the town in Scotland, are a very rarely seen type of pleat used in some Scottish kilts. They consist of a single centrally located box pleat in the rear of the kilt with knife pleats fanning out on either side.

=== Knife ===
Knife pleats are pleats turned to one side. They are used for basic gathering purposes, and form a smooth line rather than springing away from the seam they have been gathered to. The pleats have a 3:1 ratio–three inches of fabric will create one inch of finished pleat. Knife pleats can be recognized by the way that they overlap in the seam.

=== Organ ===
Organ pleats are parallel rows of softly rounded pleats resembling the pipes of a pipe organ. Carl Köhler suggests that these are made by inserting one or more gores into a panel of fabric.

=== Plissé ===
Plissé pleats, named after the French word for "fold", are narrow pleats made by gathering fabric with stitches, wetting the fabric, and "setting" the pleats by allowing the wet fabric to dry under weight or tension. Linen chemises or smocks pleated with this technique have been found in the tenth century Viking graves in Birka.

=== Rolled ===
Rolled pleats create tubular pleats which run the length of the fabric from top to bottom. A piece of the fabric to be pleated is pinched and then rolled until it is flat against the rest of the fabric, forming a tube. A variation on the rolled pleat is the stacked pleat, which is rolled similarly and requires at least five inches of fabric per finished pleat. Both types of pleating create a bulky seam.

=== Watteau ===
Watteau pleats are one or two box pleats found at the back neckline of 18th century sack-back gowns and some late 19th century tea gowns in imitation of these. The term is not contemporary, but is used by costume historians in reference to these styles as portrayed in the paintings of Antoine Watteau.

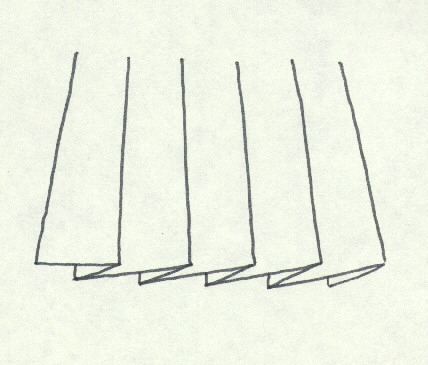
The knife pleat is the basic pleat used in sewing.

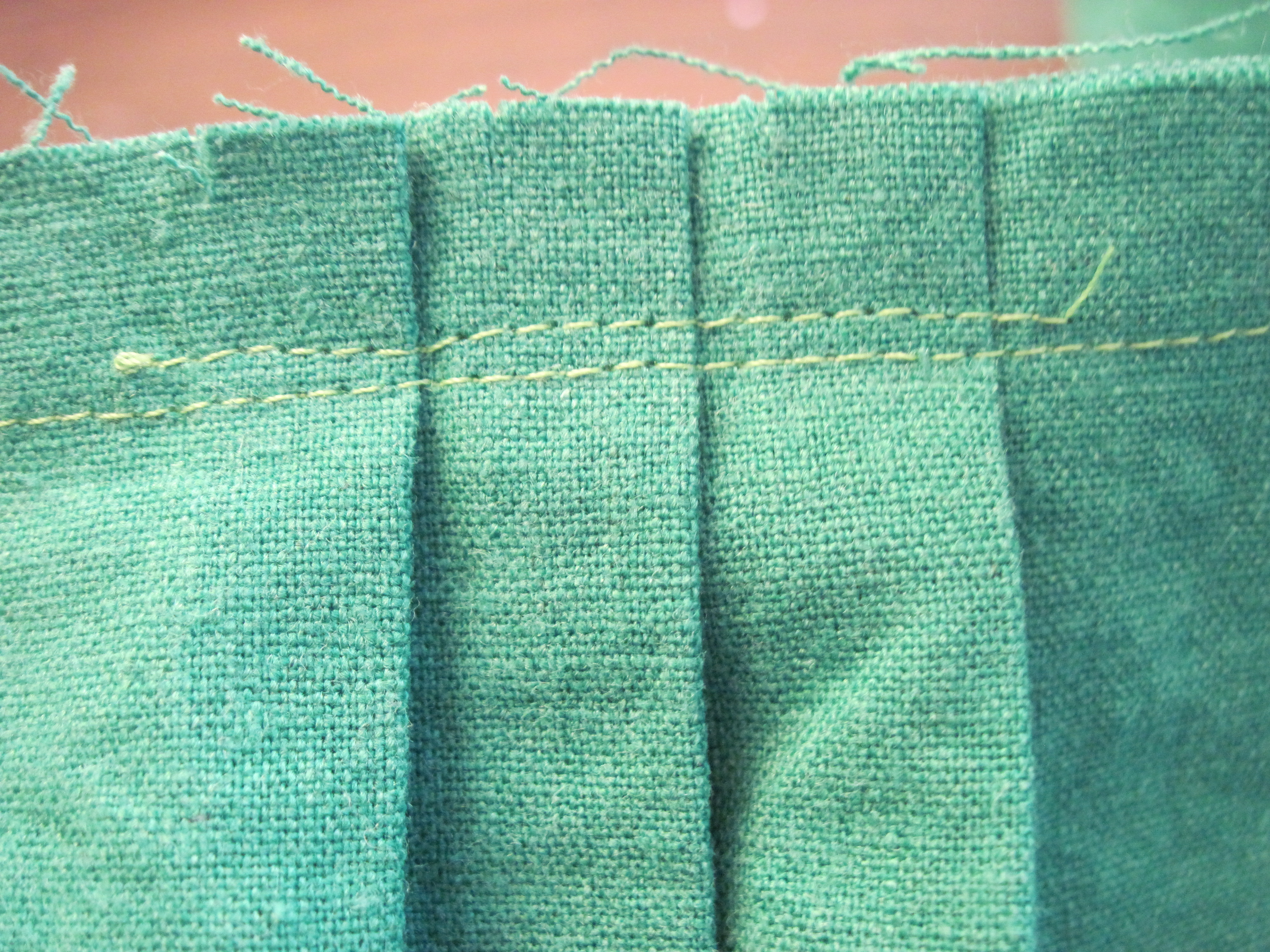
Knife pleats with the construction and seam stitches shown.

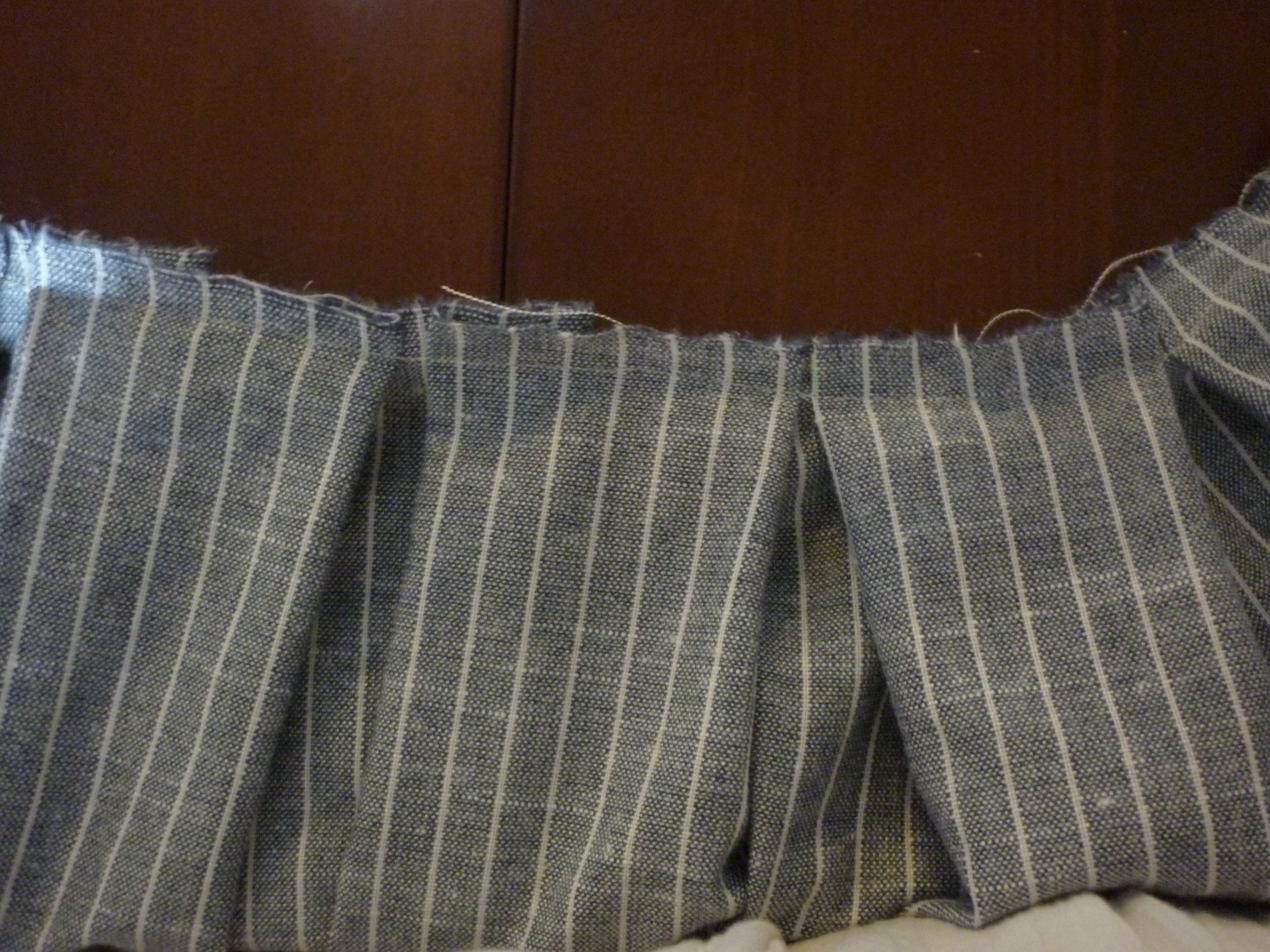
Box pleats for a skirt.

== Modern usage ==
Clothing features pleats for practical reasons (to provide freedom of movement to the wearer) as well as for purely stylistic reasons.

=== Shirts, blouses, jackets ===
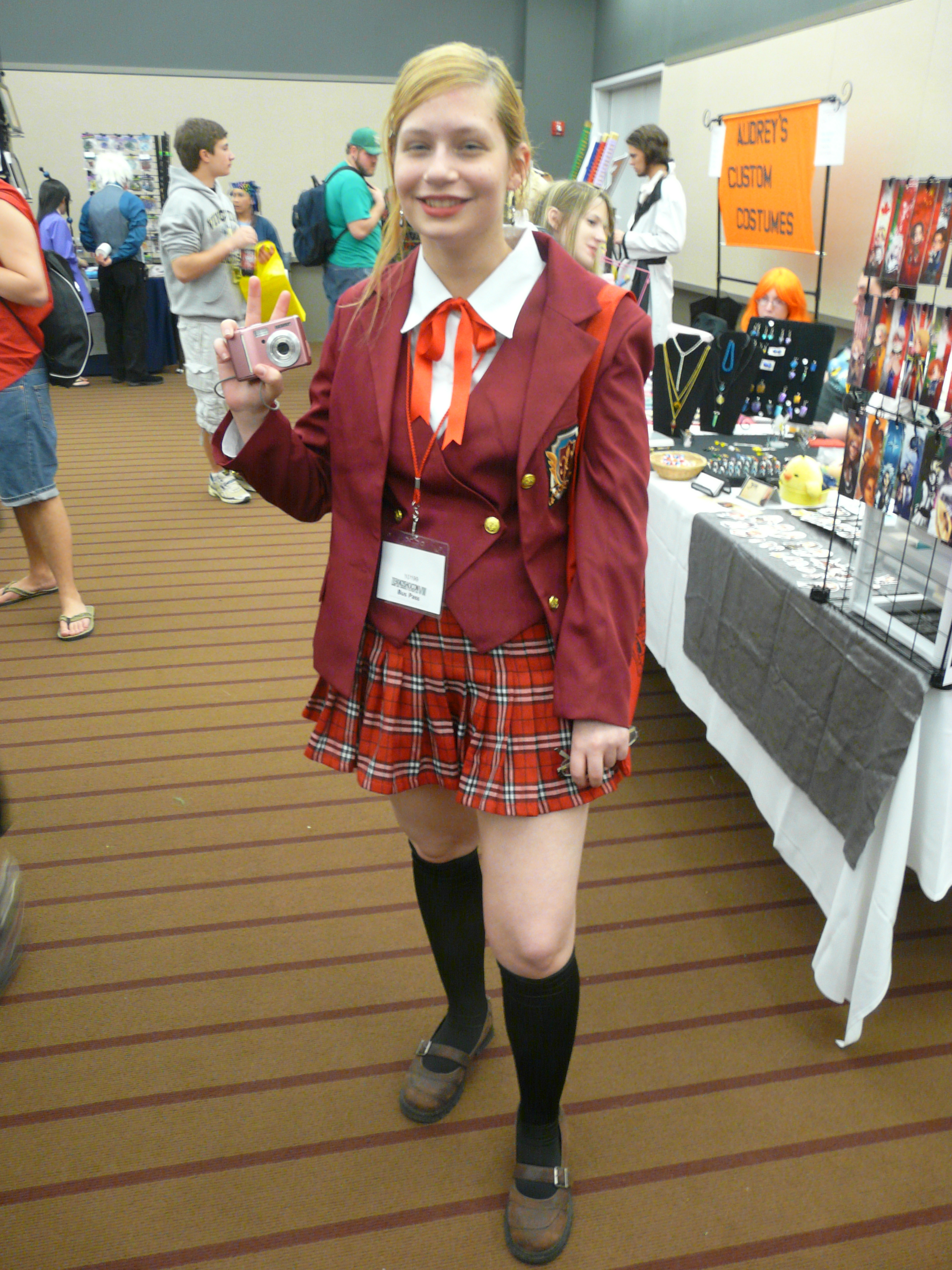
A girl wearing a pleated plaid skirt. (Tekkoshocon, Pittsburgh, Pennsylvania, 2010)

Shirts and blouses typically have pleats on the back to provide freedom of movement and on the arm where the sleeve tapers to meet the cuff. The standard men's shirt has a box pleat in the center of the back just below the shoulder or alternately one simple pleat on each side of the back.

Jackets designed for active outdoor wear frequently have pleats (usually inverted box pleats) to allow for freedom of movement. Norfolk jackets have double-ended inverted box pleats at the chest and back.

=== Skirts and kilts ===
Skirts, dresses and kilts can include pleats of various sorts to add fullness from the waist or hips, or at the hem, to allow freedom of movement or achieve design effects.

- One or more kick pleats may be set near the hem of a straight skirt to allow the wearer to walk comfortably while preserving the narrow style line.
- Modern kilts may be made with either box pleats or knife pleats, and can be pleated to the stripe or pleated to the sett (see main article Kilts: Pleating and stitching).

=== Trousers ===
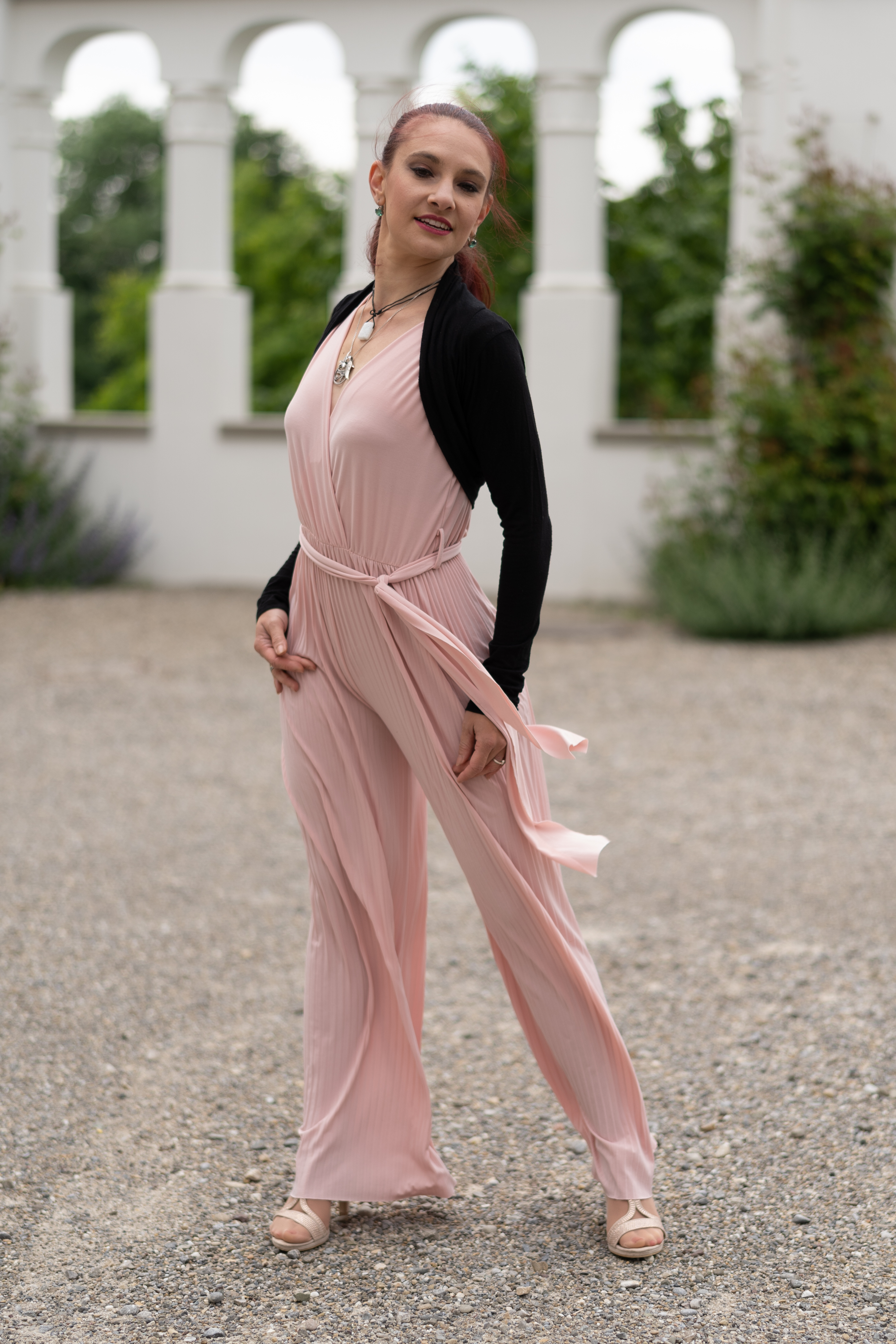
Jumpsuit with pleated legs.

Pleats just below the waistband on the front of the garment are typical of many styles of formal and casual trousers including suit trousers and khakis. There may be one, two, three, or no pleats, which may face either direction. When the pleats open towards the pockets they are called reverse pleats (typical of khakis and corduroy trousers) and when they open toward the crotch, they are known as forward pleats.

Utilitarian or very casual styles such as jeans and cargo pants are mostly flat-front (without pleats at the waistband) but may have bellows pockets.

Pleated trousers were popular before World War II. Pleated pants, especially of the double reverse pleat variety, were commonplace in the 1980s and 1990s, but by the late 2000s they had fallen out of favour.

=== Pockets ===
A bellows pocket is patch pocket with an inset box pleat to allow the pocket to expand when filled. Bellows pockets are typical of cargo pants, safari jackets, and other utilitarian garments.

=== Pleated blinds ===
The pleated blinds are curtains made of a dense fabric that folds up in an accordion when lifted. The model was developed in Germany in the middle of the 20th century. Today pleated blinds are popular all over the world due to their functionality, variety of design and effective protection from sunlight they provide.

== Gallery ==
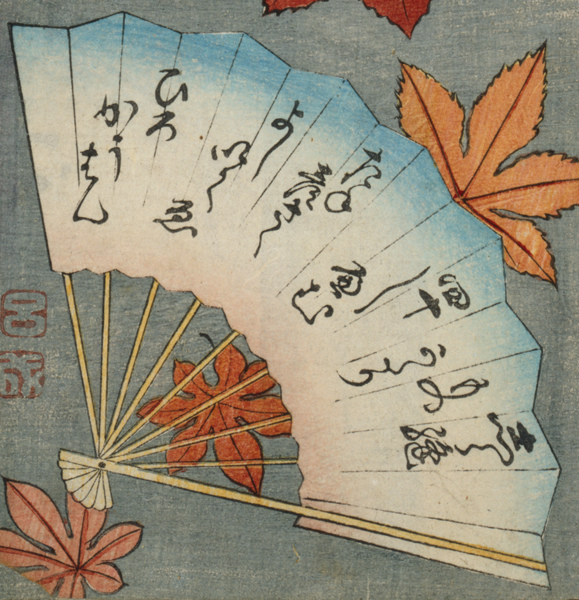
Woodblock print of sunray pleated folding fan, Japan, 19th century

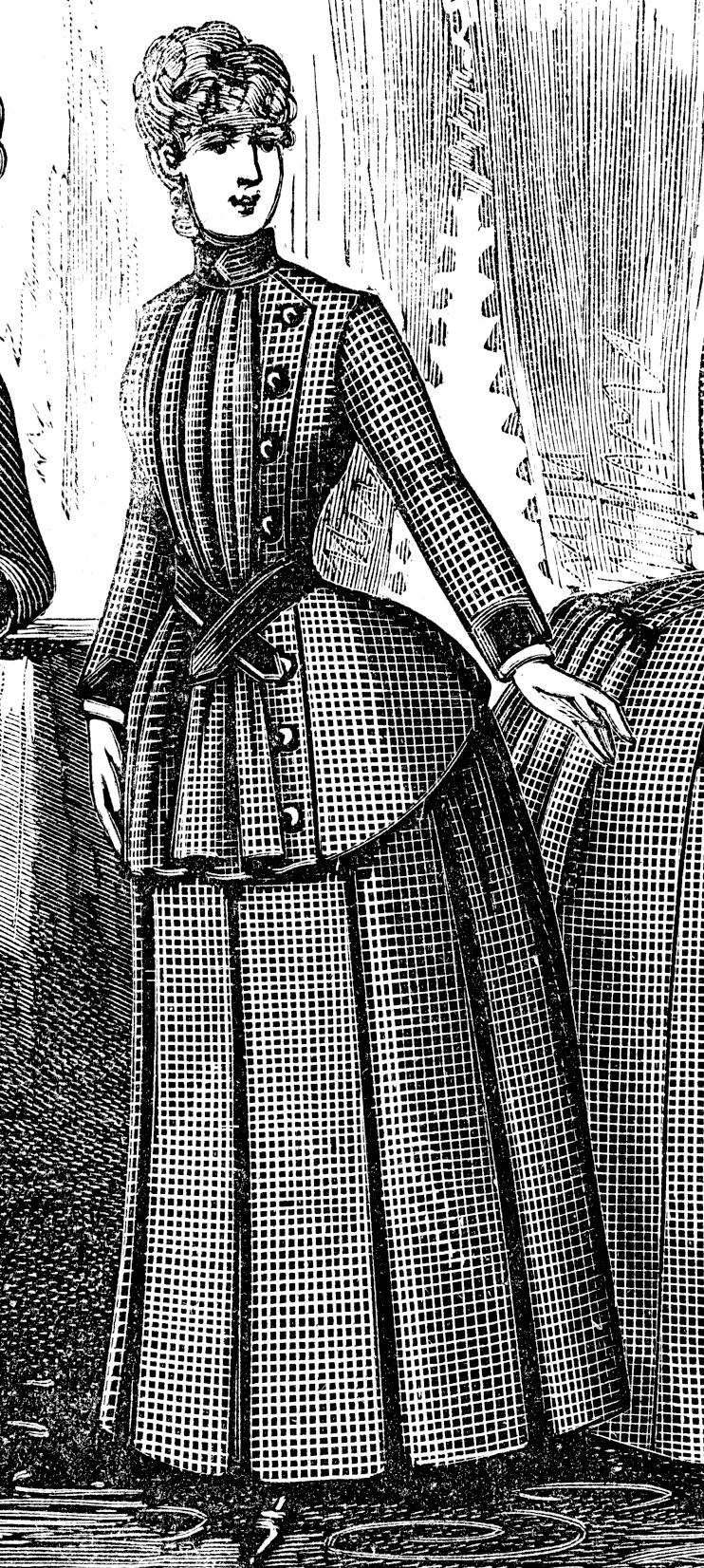
Afternoon costume with box pleated skirt and unpressed box pleated bodice panel, France, 1886

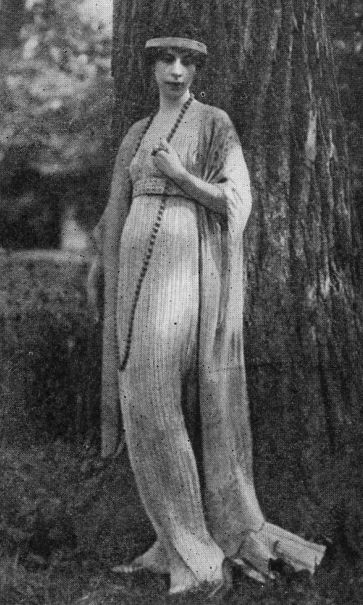
Fortuny pleated Delphos gown, 1917

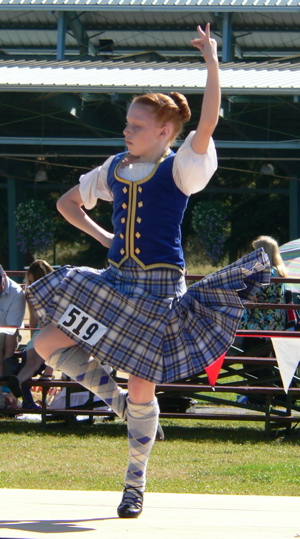
Knife-pleated kilt with pleats sewn down to the hip line, 2005

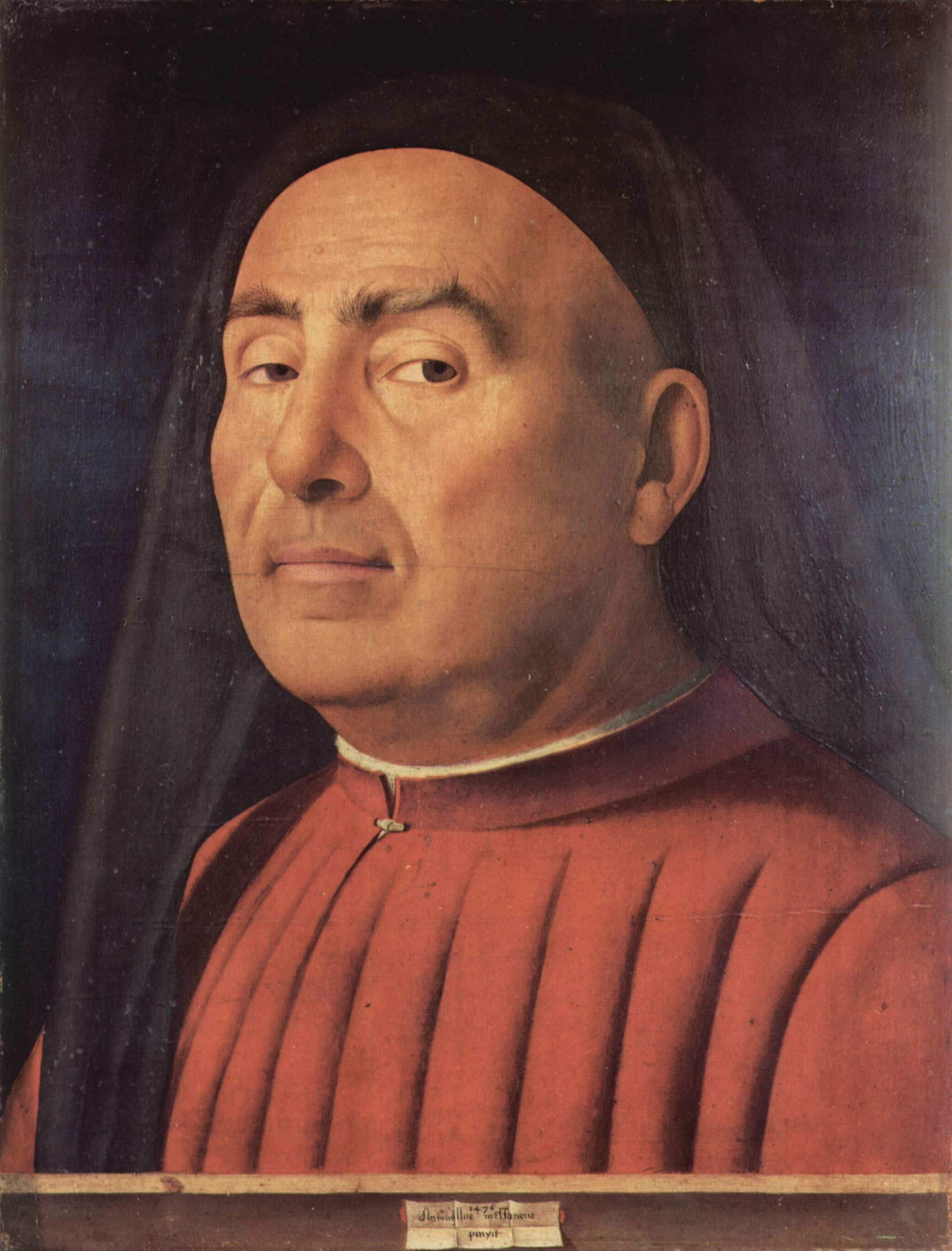
Organ pleated gown, Florentine, 1470

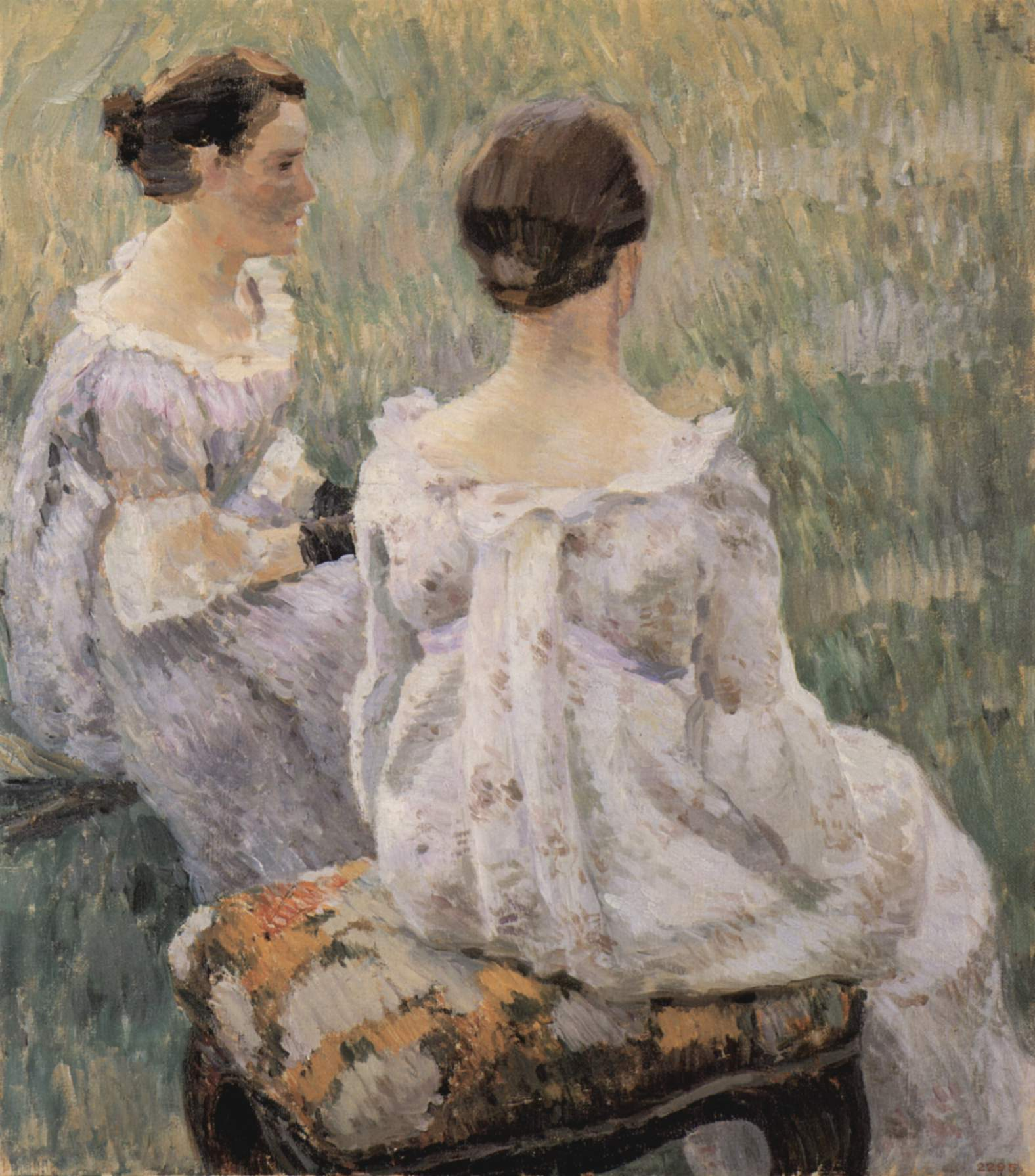
Tea gowns with Watteau-pleated backs, Russia, 1899

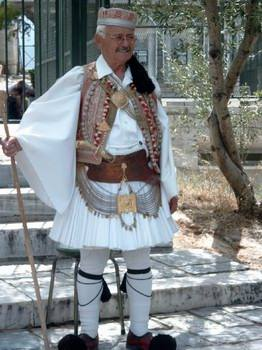
Balkans men's garb with fine boxed pleats

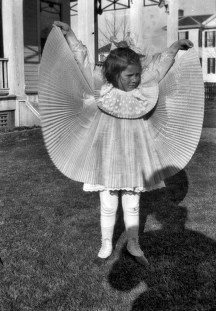
A young girl holding up an accordion pleated skirt

== See also ==
- Dart
- Gather
- David Pleat (born 1945), English football player, manager, and sports commentator

== Sources ==
- Arnold, Janet: Patterns of Fashion: the cut and construction of clothes for men and women 1560–1620, Macmillan 1985. Revised edition 1986. ISBN 0-89676-083-9
- Arnold, Janet: Patterns of Fashion 1 (cut and construction of women's clothing, 1660–1860), Wace 1964, Macmillan 1972. Revised metric edition, Drama Books 1977. ISBN 0-89676-026-X.
- Kohler, Carl: A History of Costume, Dover Publications reprint, 1963, ISBN 0-486-21030-8
- Owen-Crocker, Gale R., Dress in Anglo-Saxon Englandrevised edition, Boydell Press, 2004, ISBN 1-84383-081-7
- Picken, Mary Brooks, The Fashion Dictionary, Funk and Wagnalls, 1957. (1973 edition ISBN 0-308-10052-2)
- Tozer, Jane and Sarah Levitt, Fabric of Society: A Century of People and their Clothes 1770–1870, Laura Ashley Press, ISBN 0-9508913-0-4
