= Mariano Fortuny =

Mariano Fortuny may refer to:

- Mariano Fortuny (painter) (1838–1874), Spanish painter
- Mariano Fortuny (designer) (1871–1949), Spanish fashion designer, son of the painter
