= Babani =

French fashion house (born 1984)

- Company type: Private
- Industry: Fashion, home decor, perfume
- Founded: 1894
- Founder: Vitaldi Babani
- Defunct: 1940
- Headquarters: Paris, France
- Key people: Maurice Babani
- Products: Fashion, imported goods, perfumes

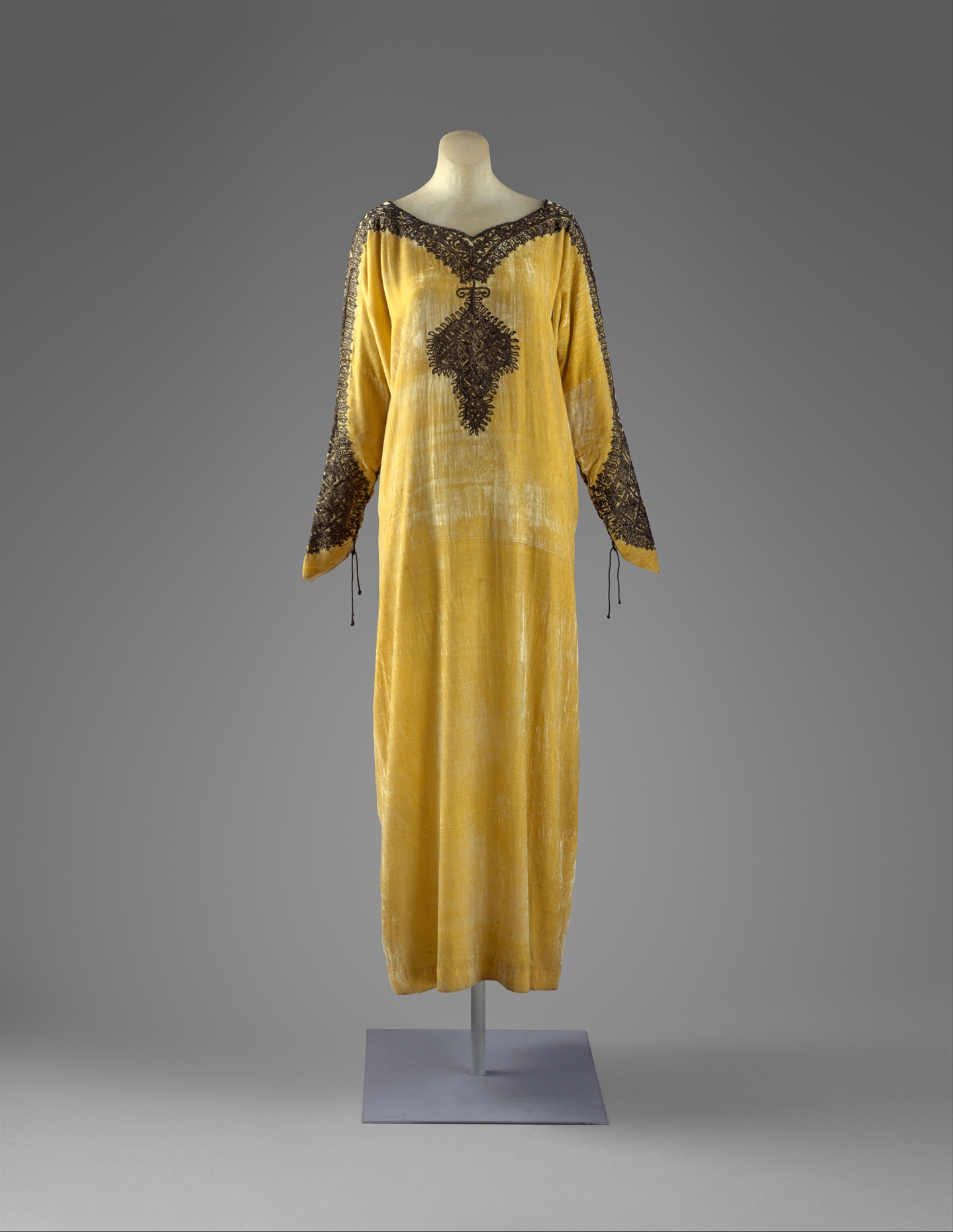
Velvet evening dress based on a North African robe, Babani, c.1925

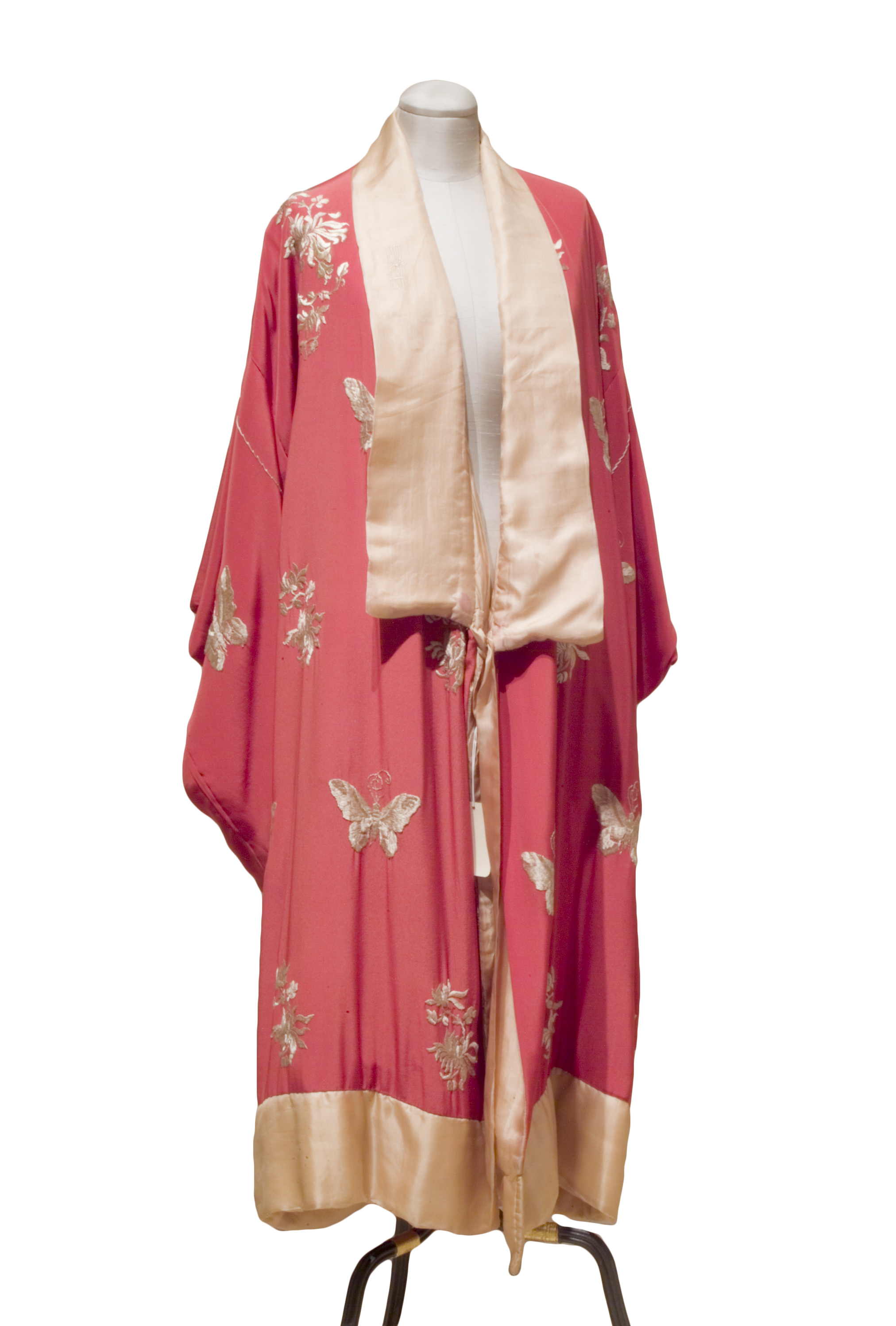
Japanese kimono retailed by Babani, 1921. (IMA)

Babani, founded in Paris in 1894 by Vitaldi Babani, was a fashion house based on the Boulevard Haussmann specialising in imported exotic goods, including artworks and handicrafts, and from the 1910s onwards, original garments inspired by their imported merchandise. The business closed in 1940.

== Fashion ==
Vitaldi Babani was born in the Middle East, the source of some of his (Note: There is some confusion as to whether Vitaldi Babani was male or female. Some sources refer to either Madame Babani or Mademoiselle Babani. Most sources cited refer to Vitaldi Babani as "he".) wares. In the beginning Babani's merchandise consisted of objets d'art in bronze and ivory, furniture, rugs, embroideries and silks imported from China, Japan, India, and Turkey, which were sold from the establishment at 98 Boulevard Haussmann and from an additional shop at no. 65, Rue d'Anjou, Paris.

In the first decade of the 20th century, it became very fashionable for Western women to wear Japanese nagajubans (the robes worn underneath a traditional kimono) for a peignoir, and Babani, through a series of advertisements in Le Figaro-Madame, successfully established himself as the foremost retailer of such so-called robes japonaises. In addition to these, Babani, along with Paul Poiret, had a license to retail textiles and garments by the Venice-based designer Fortuny, including his famous pleated silk Delphos gowns. Babani also imported textiles from the London department store Liberty & Co. From about 1919, when Vitaldi's fashion-designer son Maurice joined the business, the label began to focus more on clothing and produced garments which were heavily influenced by their imported merchandise. Maurice Babani's designs tended to be explicitly based upon their sources, such as a dress reproducing a North African embroidered robe, but using silk velvet rather than the woollen textile of the original. It is thought that Babani owned embroidery workshops in Constantinople and Kyoto, where some of the textiles in their garments would have been produced.

Notable clients included the Spanish artist Joaquín Sorolla, who while in Paris in September 1913, ordered two kimonos from Babani. The actress Eleonora Duse bought a number of Fortuny garments there, and Katharine Hepburn wore a white crushed velvet Babani dress with antique gold embroidery for her 1928 wedding to Ludlow Ogden Smith.

== Perfumes ==
In 1919, Maurice Babani was the second French couturier, after Poiret, to launch a perfume house, and the first to create exclusive marketing names for his perfumes. His fragrances featured exotic names such as Afghani (1920), Abdulla (1926), Yashmak (1924), and Sousuki (1928) and came in distinctive black and gold packaging.

In 1924, Elizabeth Arden tried exclusively marketing six Babani scents to American women as a "wardrobe of perfumes". Despite Arden's publicity drive, Babani lacked sufficient recognition in the United States to make the venture succeed.
