= Henriette Negrin =

Textile arts artist and clothes-designer (born 1877)

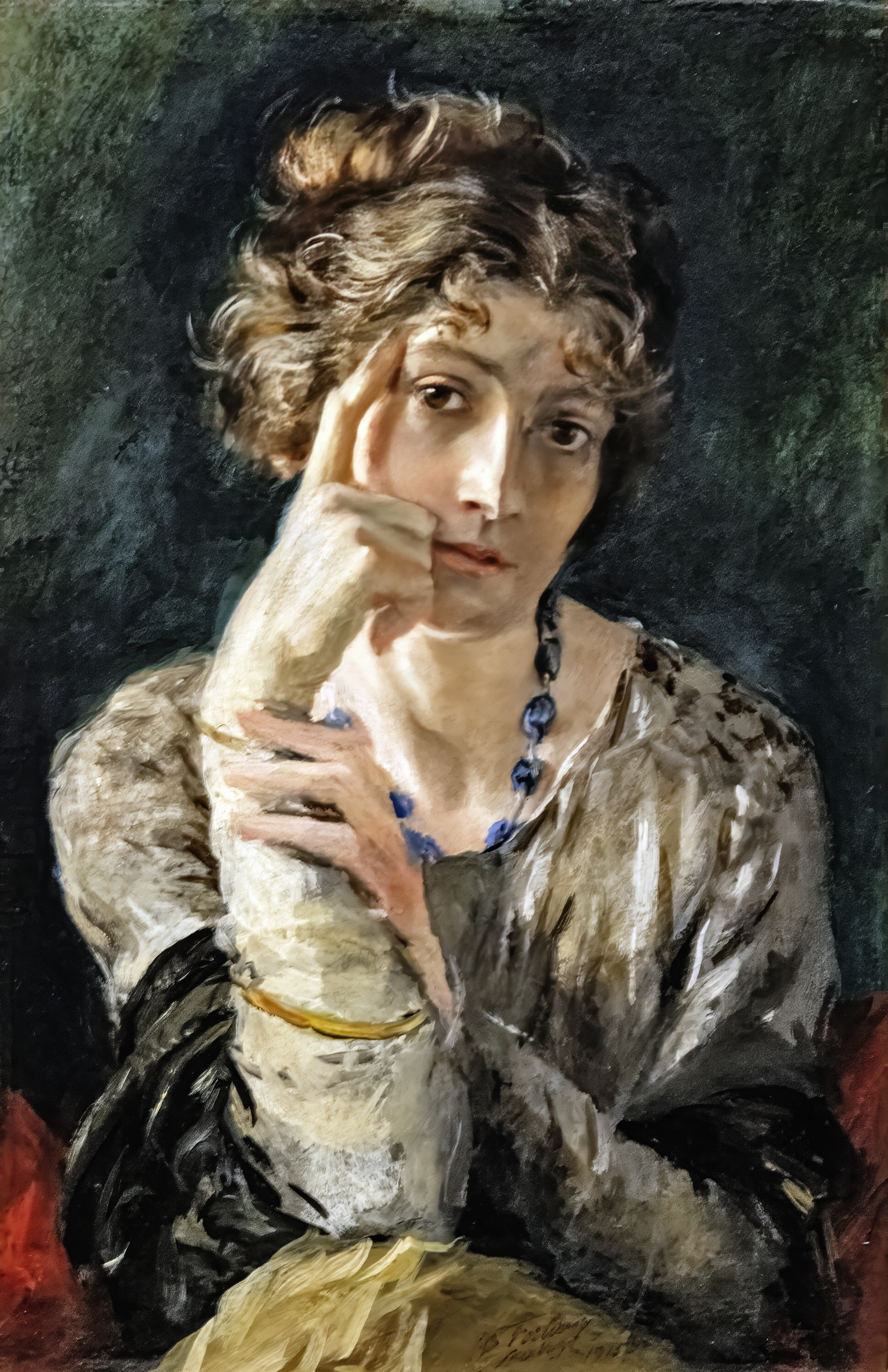
- Portrait of Madame Henriette Fortuny by Mariano Fortuny y Madrazo (1915).
- Born: 4 October 1877; Fontainebleau, France
- Died: 16 March 1965 (aged 87); Venice, Italy
- Occupations: Clothes designer, textile artist
- Known for: Development of the pleating machine, design of the Delphos gown
- Spouse: Mariano Fortuny

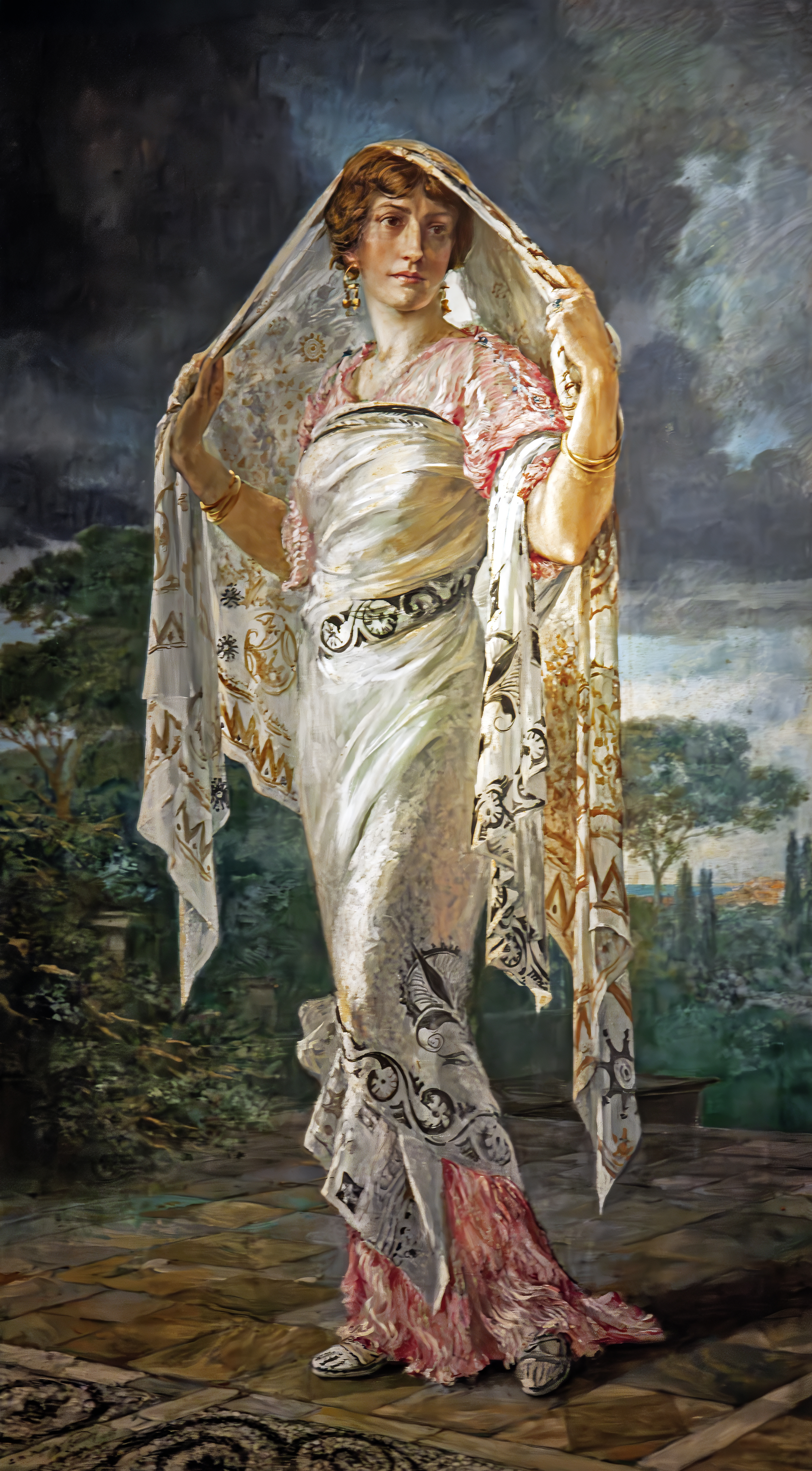
Henriette Fortuny wearing Fortuny garments, including the pleated Delphos gown she designed. Portrait by Mariano Fortuny (1935), Musée Fortuny, Venice.

Adèle Henriette Negrin (born on 4 October 1877 in Fontainebleau; died on 16 March 1965 in Venice) was a French socialite, fashion designer, and textile artist. She created fabrics and clothes, often working alongside her husband Mariano Fortuny.

== Biography ==
Henriette Negrin met Mariano Fortuny in Paris at the beginning of the 20th century and, in 1902, went to live with him in Venice at the Palazzo Pesaro degli Orfei, now Palazzo Fortuny, one of the museums of the city.

Henriette Negrin and her husband shared an interest in textile creations. In particular, she researched pigments for the dyeing of fabrics, applying the dyes herself to the wood stencils for printing the textiles. She developed a pleating machine the patent for which was filed by the National Institute of Industrial Property (France) of Paris on 10 June 1909. In a signed hand-written note on a copy of the patent (copy kept at the Marciana Library), Mariano Fortuny acknowledged his future wife as the inventor of the machine: "Ce brevet est de la propriété de Madame Henriette Brassart qui est l’inventeur. J’ai pris ce brevet en mon nom pour l’urgence du dépôt". ("This patent is the property of Madame Henriette Brassart who is the inventor. I submitted this patent in my name given the urgency of filing").

This pleating technique plays a central role in the design of the Delphos gown, whose creation Henriette Negrin confirmed as her own in a letter to Elsie McNeill Lee, at the time the exclusive distributor of the Fortuny fabrics and dresses in the United States. In the letter, Henriette Negrin indicated her decision to terminate all production of the dress that she had designed.

During the 47 years of her life with Mariano Fortuny, Henriette Negrin was fully involved in all aspects of their creative life. After his death, she curated her husband's art collection, donating works to several museums and compiling the inventory of the contents of their residence. She donated the building to the city of Venice, which came into its full possession after her death on 16 March 1965.
