= Fortuny Museum =

Coordinates: 45°26′08″N 12°19′56″E

Palazzo Fortuny
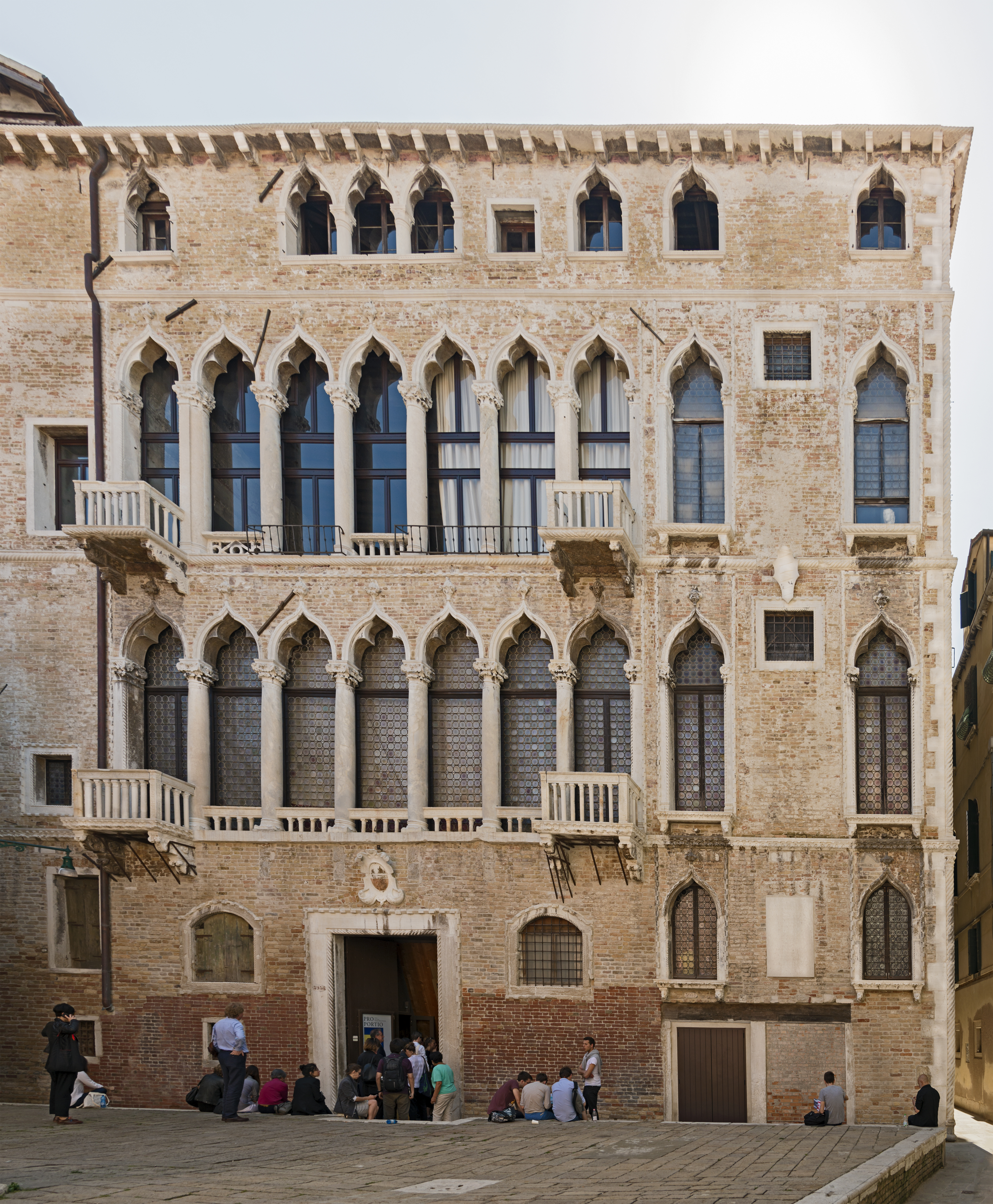
- Façade of Palazzo Fortuny
- Established: 1975
- Location: San Marco 3958, 30124 Venice, Italy
- Type: Art museum
- Director: Daniela Ferretti
- Website: fortuny.visitmuve.it

The Museo Fortuny or Fortuny Museum is an art museum in San Marco, in central Venice, Italy.

The museum is housed in the Palazzo Pesaro Orfei, now often known as Palazzo Fortuny, where Mariano Fortuny (1871–1949) had a studio in the late nineteenth century, and lived from 1902.

The museum presents paintings, fabrics, and Fortuny’s lamps on the first floor, together with the history of the palazzo and its atelier on the second floor. The building still has features created by Fortuny. The working environment is represented through wall-hangings, paintings, and lamps.

Fortuny died in 1949, and in 1956 the Palazzo Pesaro Orfei was gifted to the comune of Venice; the comune took full possession only in 1965, after the death of Fortuny's widow, Henriette Negrin. The museum was opened in 1975. It is run by the Fondazione Musei Civici di Venezia.

The website for the museum is at: Fortuny Museum Website

== Collections ==
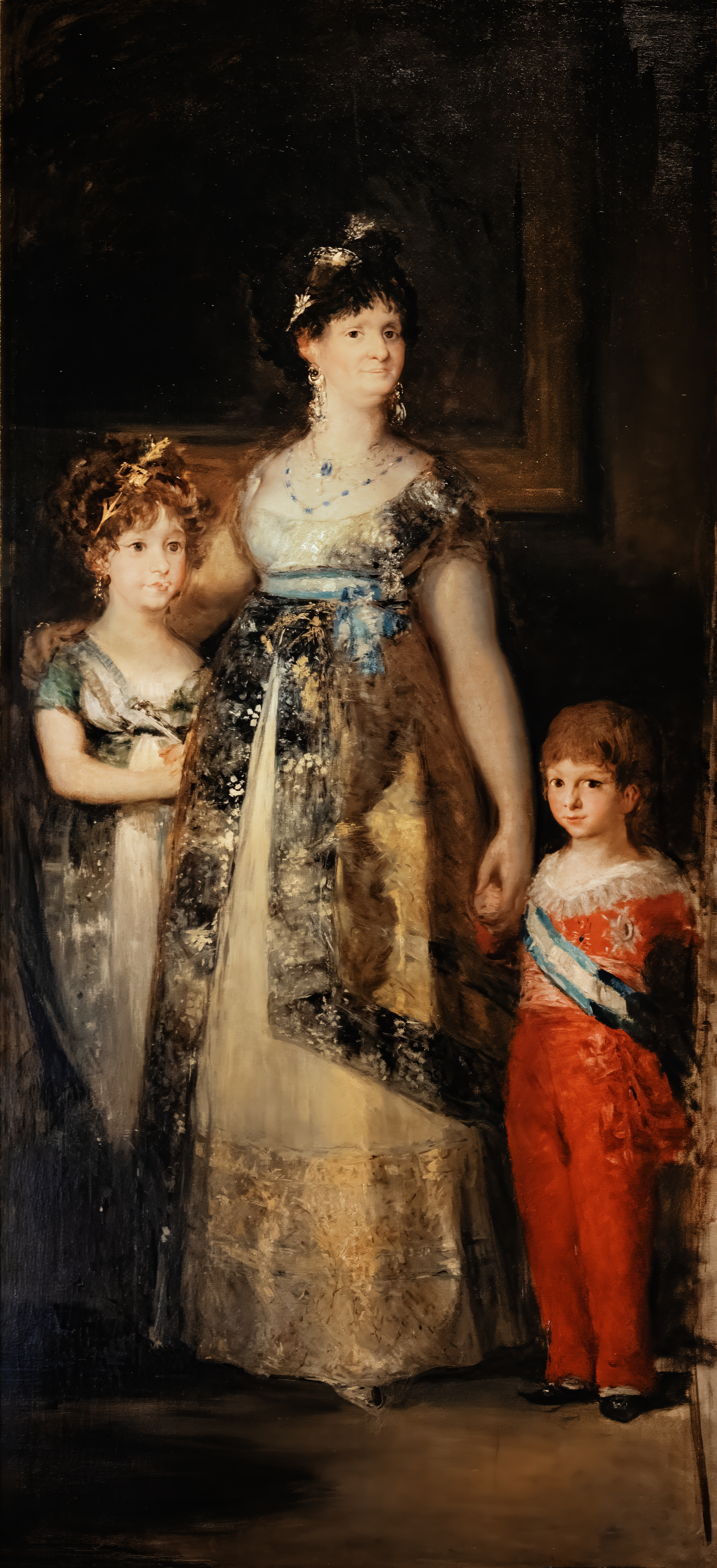
The family of Charles IV copy after Goya by Marià Fortuny

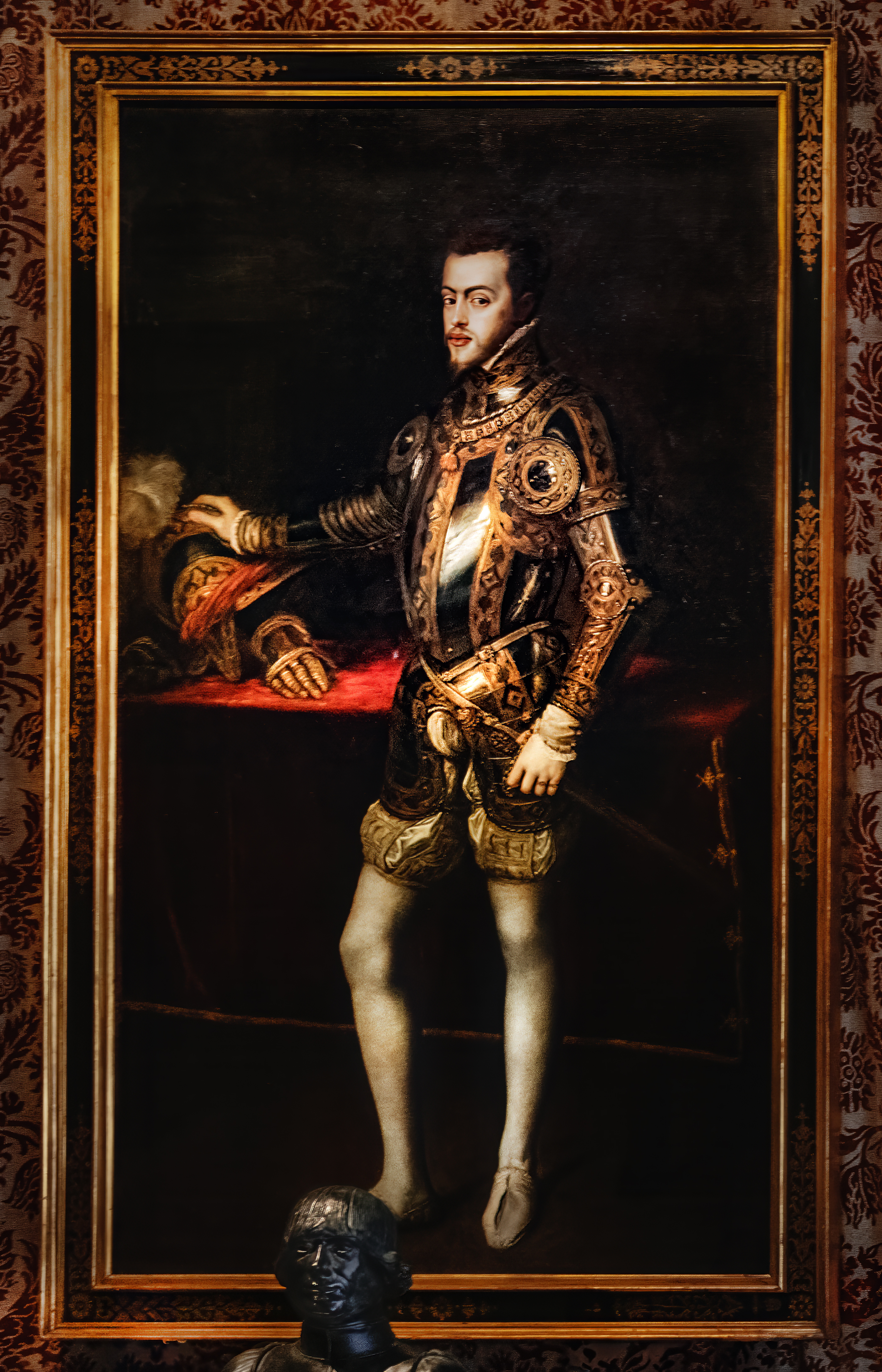
Philip II in armor copied from Titian by Mariano Fortuny y Madrazo

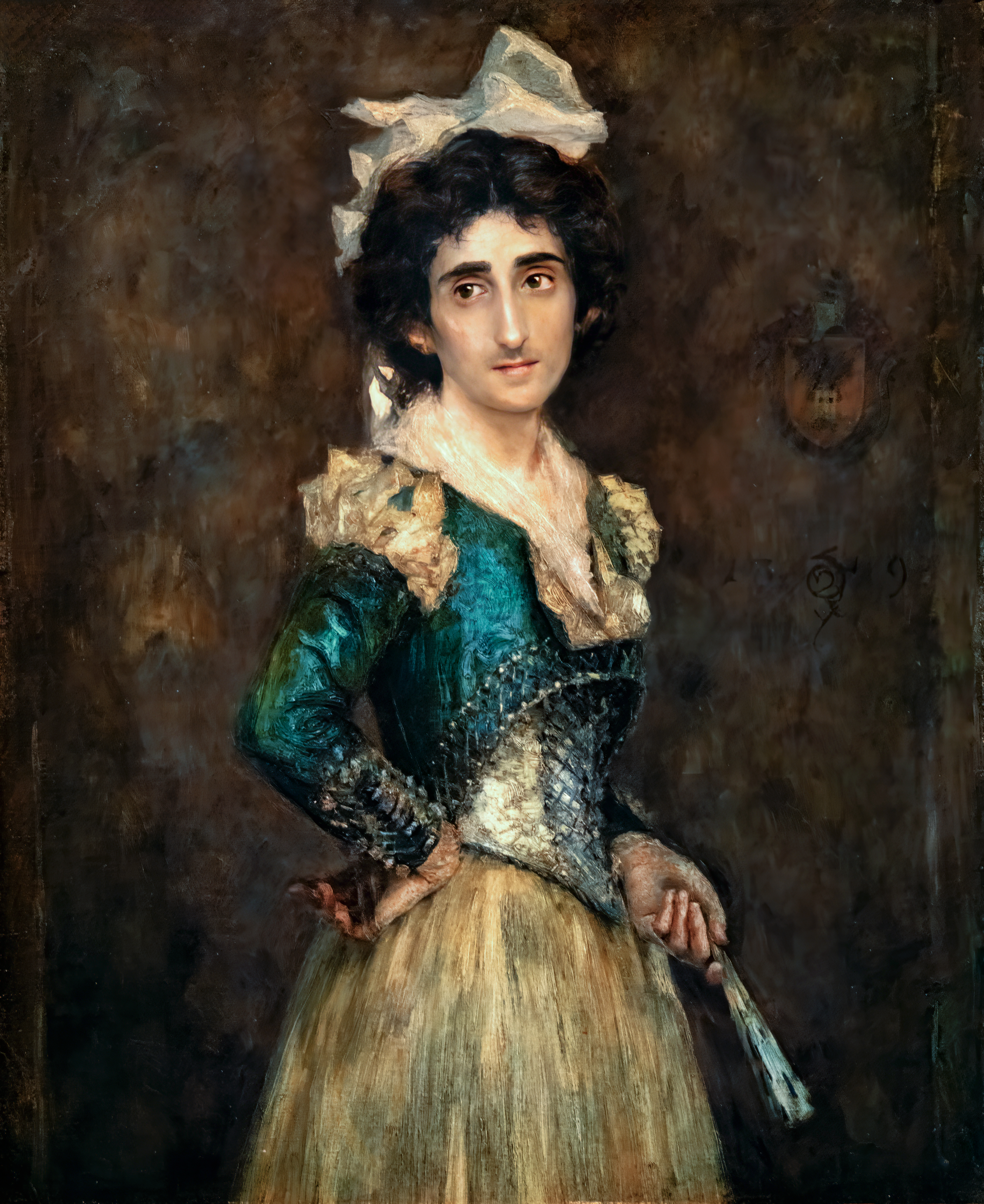
Maria Luisa Fortuny by Mariano Fortuny y Madrazo

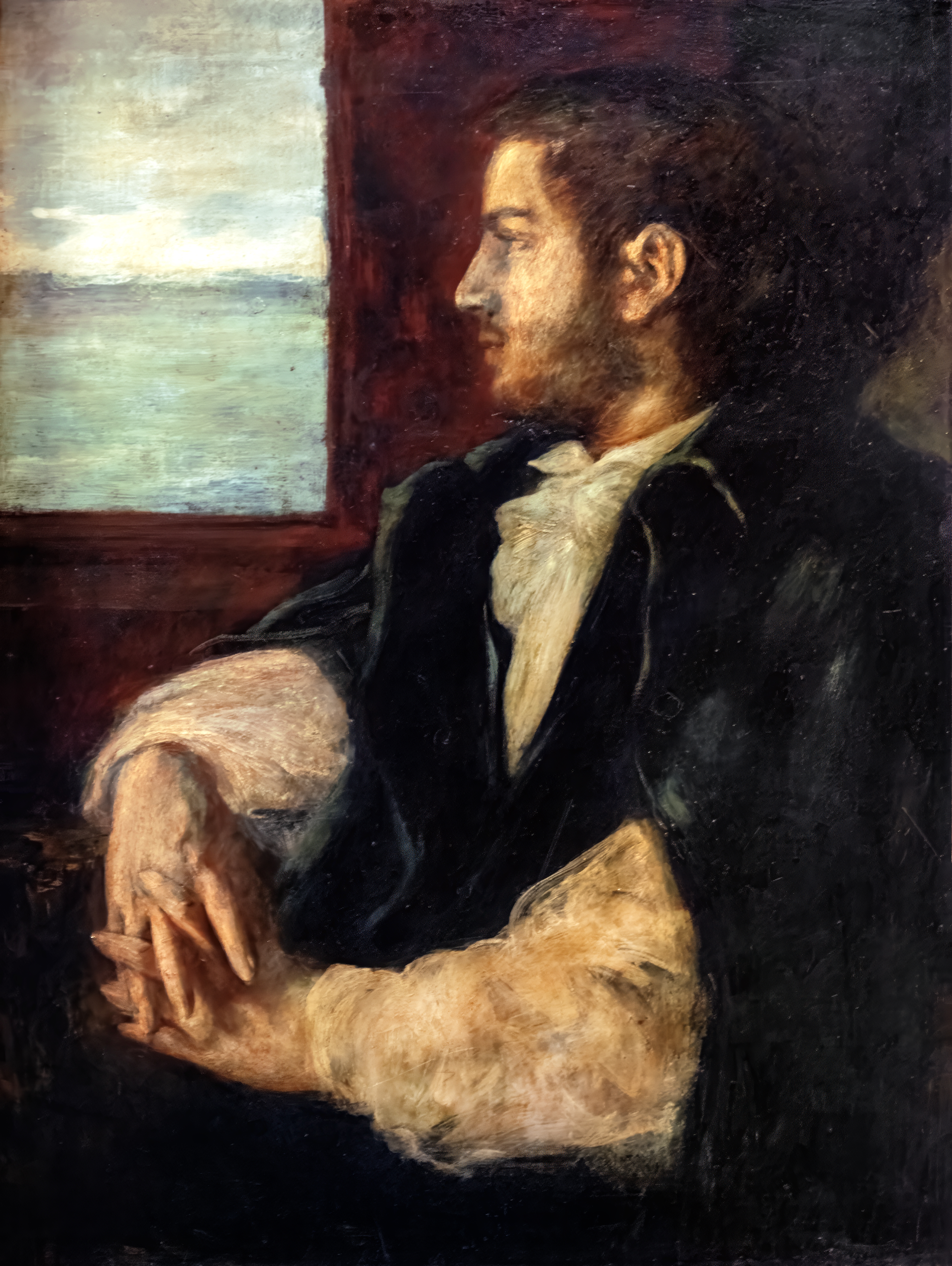
Self-portrait circa 1895.

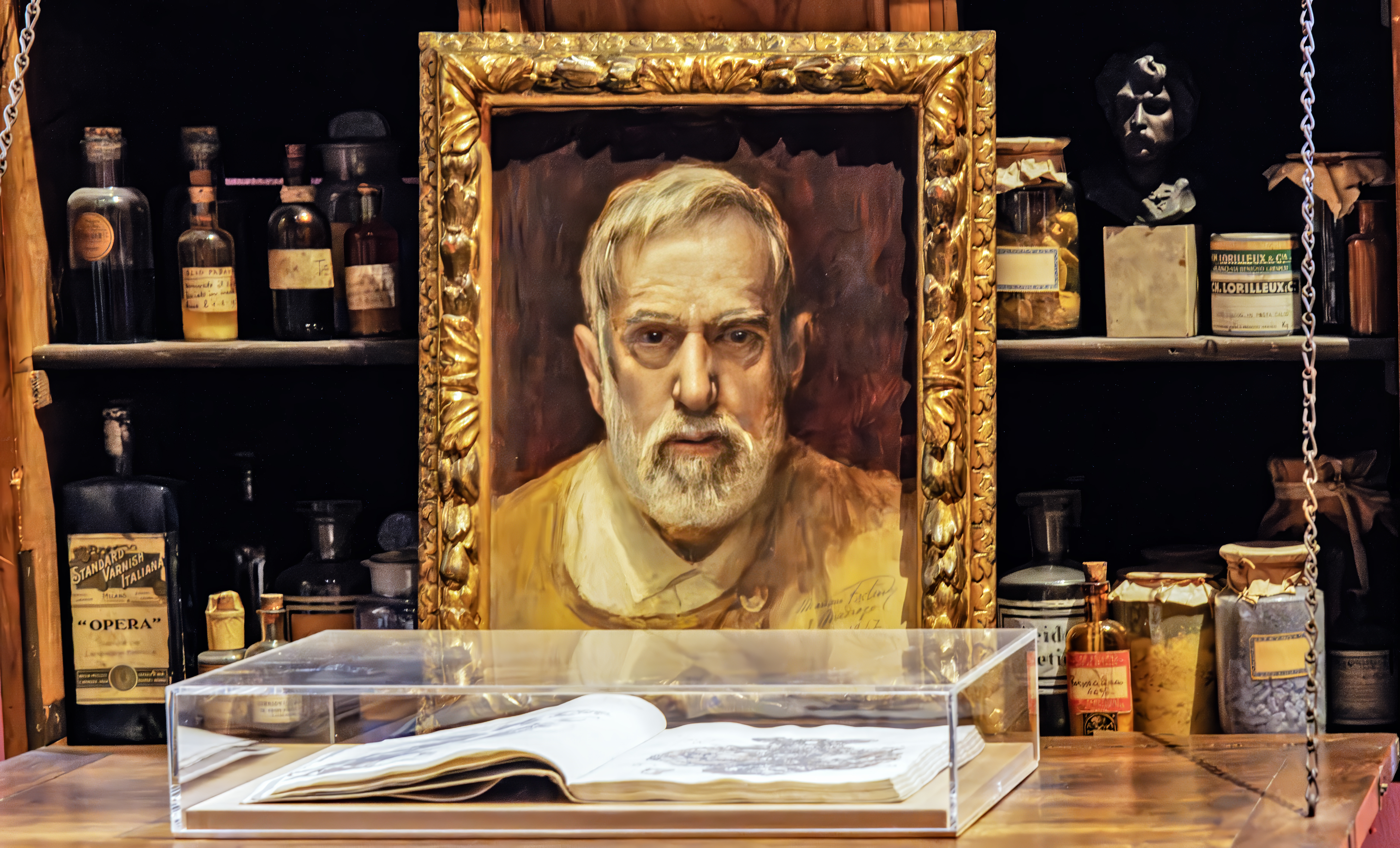
Self-portrait (1945) - staged in his studio

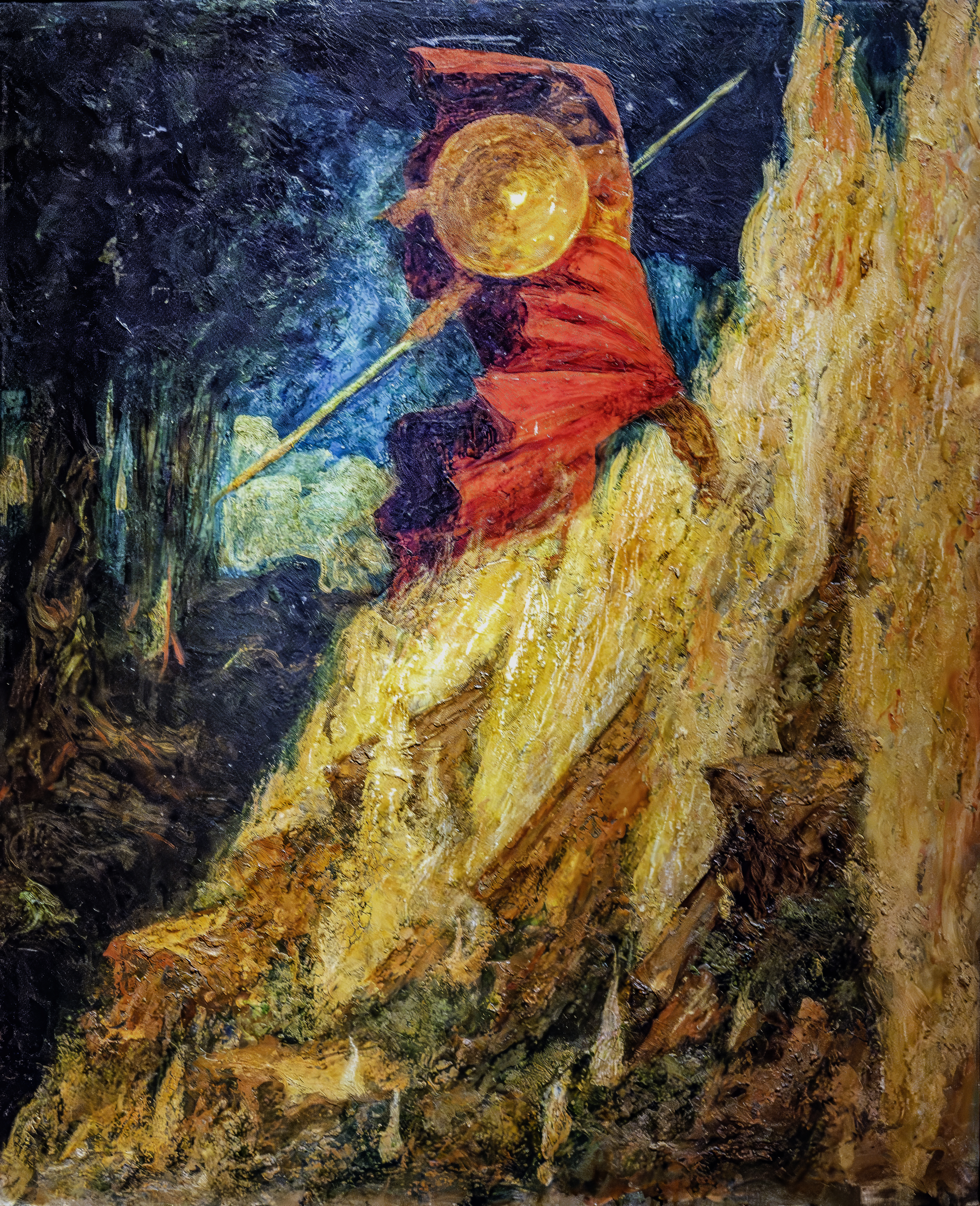
Wagnerian Cycle. The Valkyrie, Wotan strikes the rock from which the flames that will protect Brunhild's dream spring forth

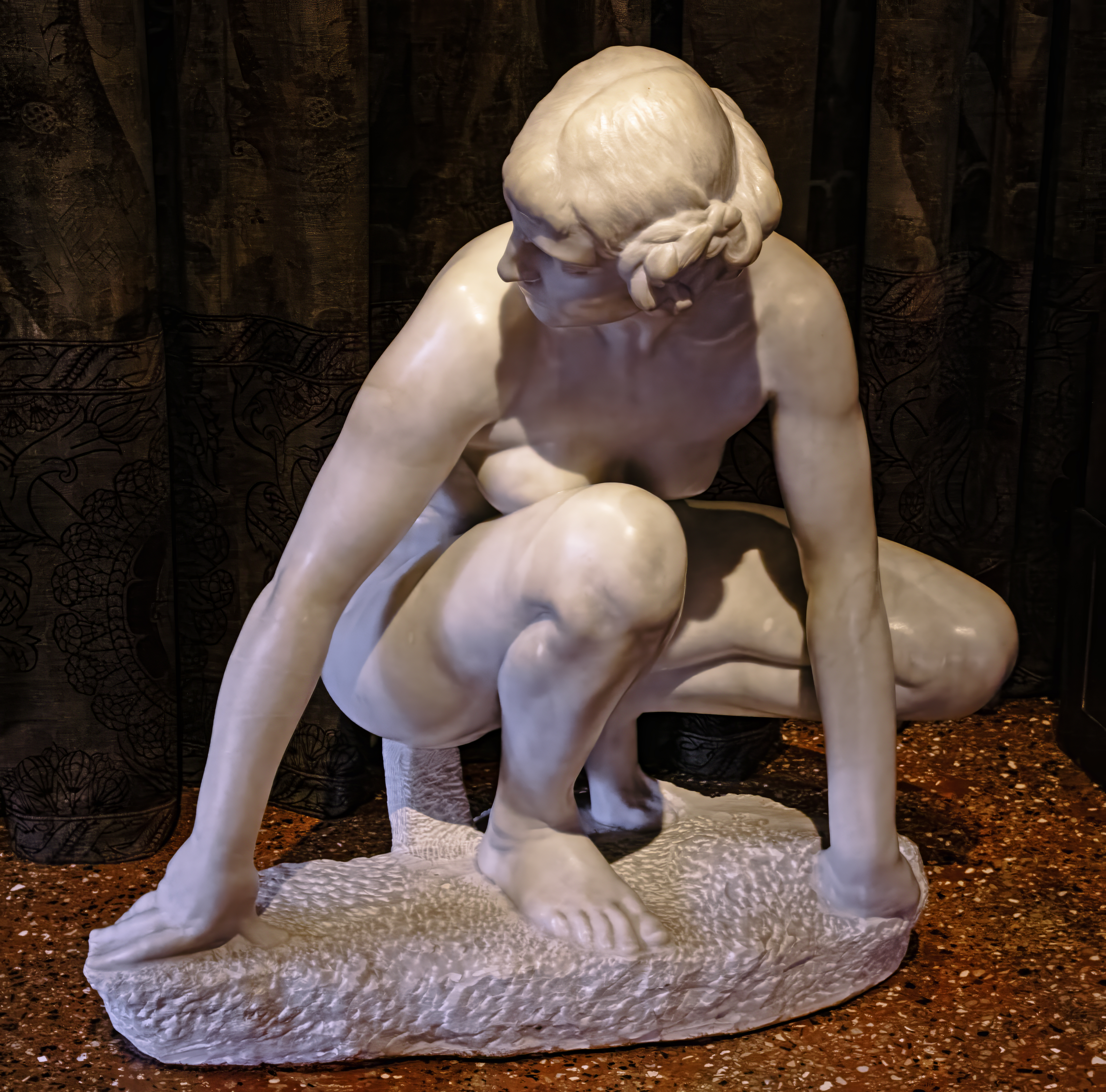
Female nude (Susanna) by Giuseppe Graziosi

== See also ==
- List of single-artist museums
