= Delphos gown =

Type of pleated woman's dress designed 1907

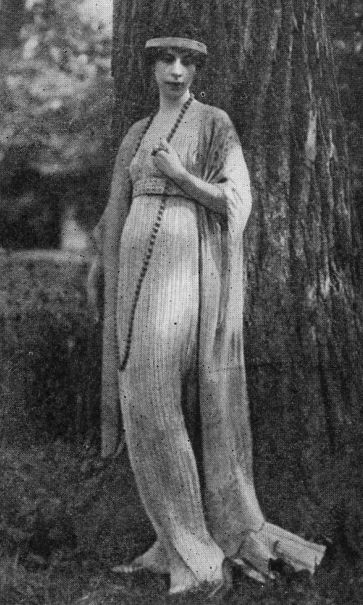
Clarisse Coudert, married to Condé Montrose Nast, wearing one of the famous Fortuny tea gowns. "This one has no tunic but is finely pleated in the Fortuny manner, and falls in long lines closely following the figure to the floor."

The Delphos gown is a finely pleated silk dress first created in about 1907 by French designer Henriette Negrin (1877–1965) and her husband, Mariano Fortuny y Madrazo (1871–1949). Negrin was the designer; Fortuny filed the patent for the manufacturing method in his own name, while crediting her in the application. They produced the gowns until about 1950. It was inspired by, and named after, a classical Greek statue, the Charioteer of Delphi. Since the 1970s, these gowns have been desirable and collectable pieces of vintage clothing, with one selling for $10,000 in December 2001, and a record setting $18,750 at Augusta Auctions in December 2025.

== History ==
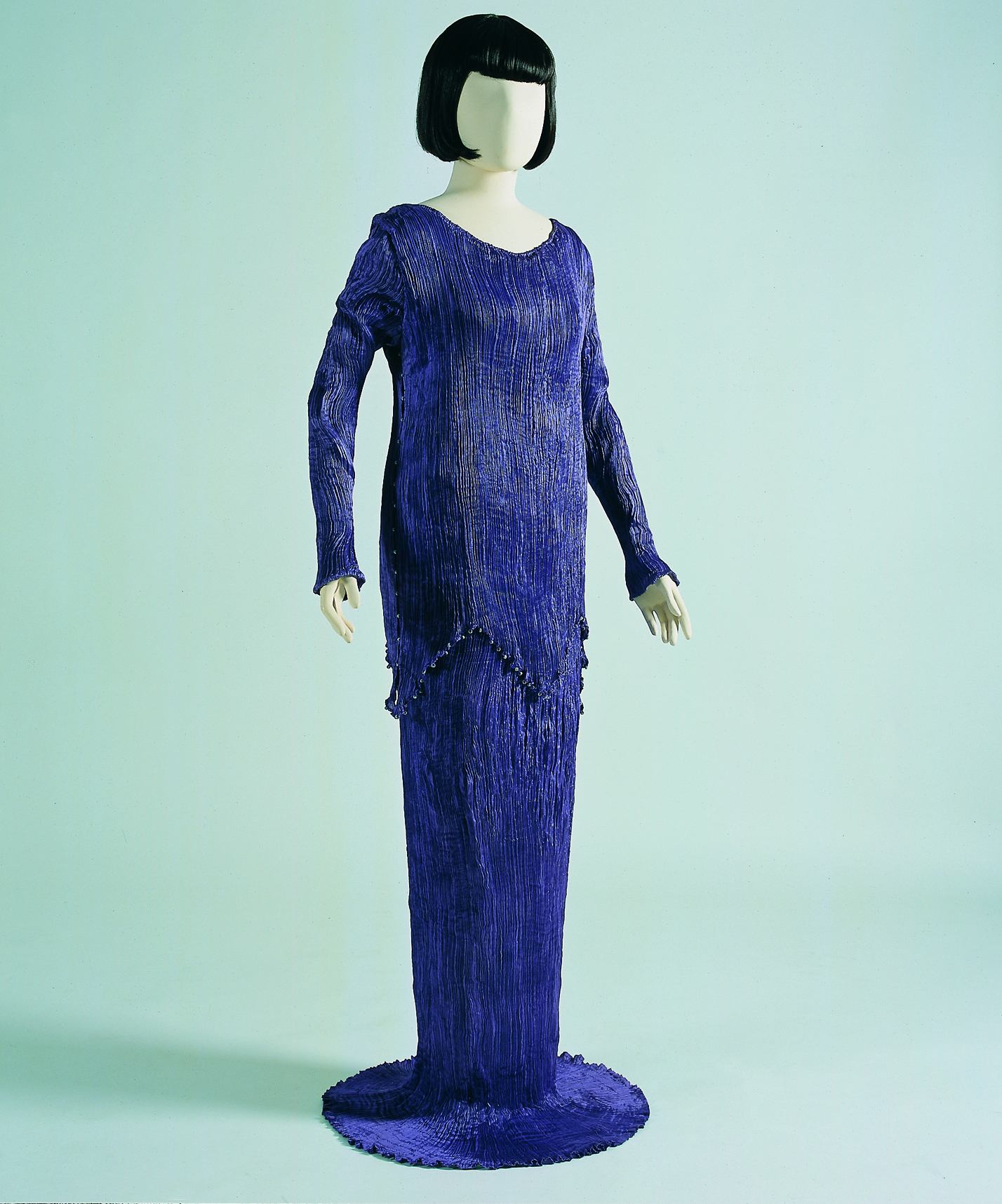
Purple silk 'Peplos' with sleeves. PFF collection

Working out of a 13th-century Venetian palazzo, Fortuny, a Spanish-born artist turned textile designer, produced garments that the novelist Marcel Proust declared "faithfully antique but markedly original". The "Delphos" was a deliberate reference to the chiton of ancient Greece and meant to be worn without undergarments, since the chiton was itself a form of underwear, a radical suggestion during the early years of the 20th century.

Fortuny became famous for his pleated dresses, the "Delphos" and the related "Peplos", adding a short tunic layer meant to resemble the ancient Greek apoptygma. The exact method of pleating was a closely guarded secret involving heat, pressure and ceramic rods, which has never been replicated. On both types of dresses, glass Murano beads are strung on a silk cord along each side seam. The beads serve a functional purpose as well as being decorative, as they weigh down the lightweight silk of the garment to ensure a smooth fit enhancing the natural, uncorseted human form beneath. The construction of the Delphos became its own decoration. Although the "Delphos" eventually became formal wear, with Lauren Bacall wearing a vintage red Delphos to the 1978 Oscars, it was originally intended as informal clothing or a tea gown for wearing solely in the privacy of the home.

Delphos gowns were imported into Paris by the couturier Paul Poiret, and the fashion house Babani which sold them to actresses such as Eleonora Duse.

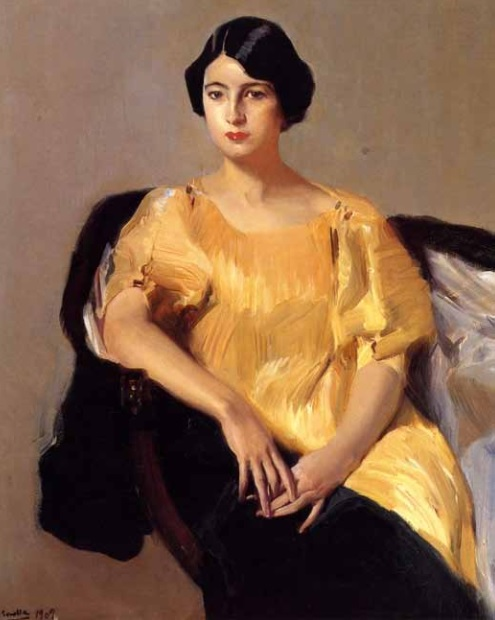
Elena vestida con túnica amarilla by Joaquín Sorolla, 1909. Elena Sorolla García in a yellow Delphos.

== The Delphos as art ==
Fortuny's garments, particularly the Delphos gown, have been valued for their artistic and aesthetic qualities since their creation. The fashion historian and writer Colin McDowell considers Fortuny one of the creators of fashion as art, and a Delphos gown was one of only two garments contained in the collection of the Museum of Modern Art, New York in 2003.

During the 1910s and 1920s the Spanish painter Joaquín Sorolla painted several portraits of his wife and other sitters wearing Delphos gowns, some of which are preserved at the Museo Sorolla. The sculptor Hamo Thornycroft described his daughter Elfrida as looking lovely in a 'silk Greek clinging white dress', a Delphos which Elfrida later donated to the Victoria and Albert Museum.

In literature, Marcel Proust described Fortuny's clothes several times in his epic novel In Search of Lost Time, comparing them to musical harmonies, although not explicitly calling them art.

In a 2015 episode of the British television series Downton Abbey, a character (Lady Mary Crawley, played by Michelle Dockery) wore an authentic Peplos gown on loan from the Fortuny brand. It was the first instance of an authentic Delphos being used by a modern television production.

== Sources ==
- Edwardian promenade: Fortuny’s “Delphos” Gown
- Dykes, Amy Renee: Documentation of a Mariano Fortuny Delphos gown. University of Georgia 2003
