= Palazzo Pesaro Orfei =

Historic palace in Venice, Italy

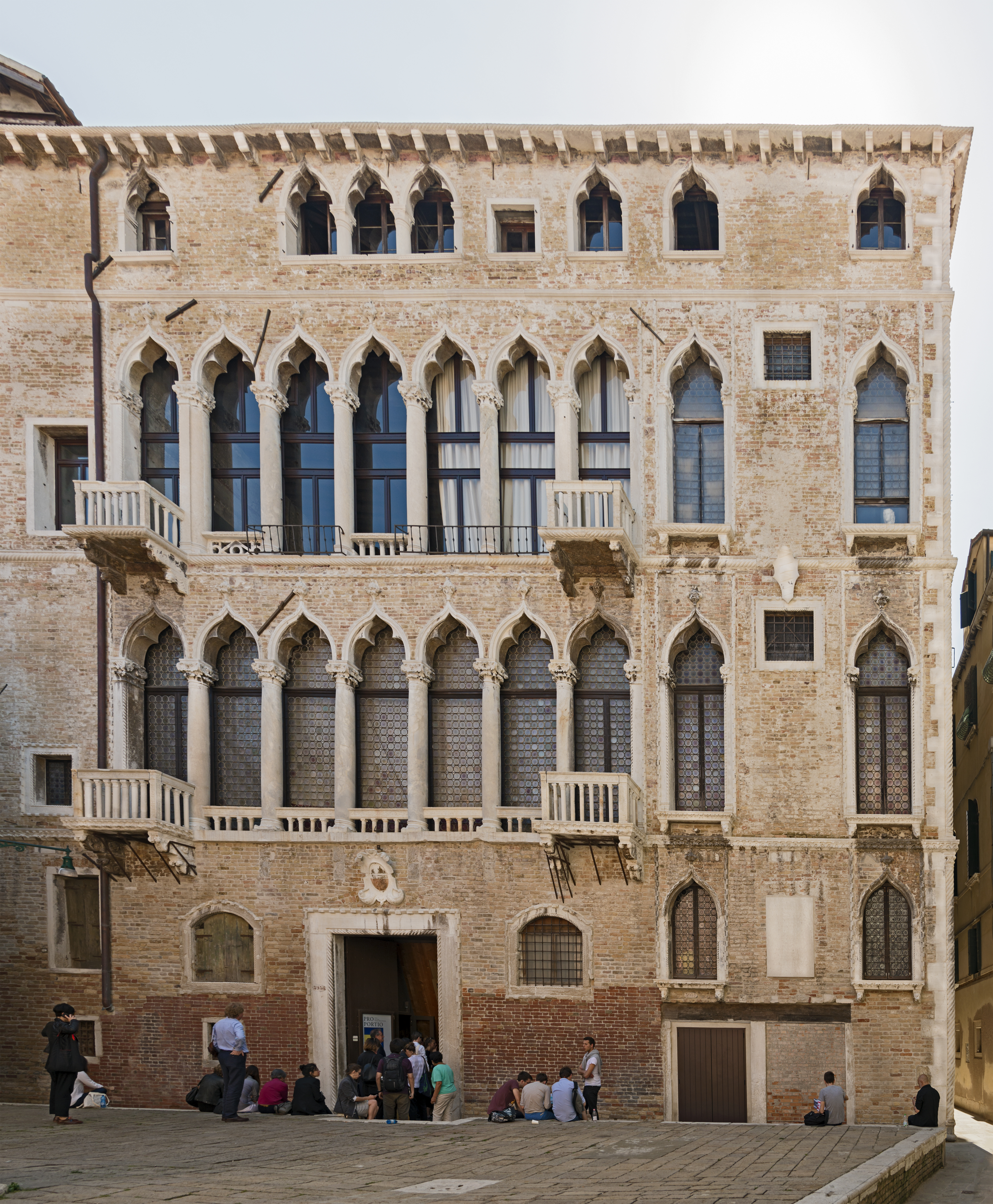
- Façade of the palace on Campo San Beneto
- Interactive map of the Palazzo Pesaro Orfei area
- Alternative names: Palazzo Pesaro degli Orfei; Palazzo Fortuny

General information
- Architectural style: Venetian Gothic
- Location: Campo San Beneto, Venice, Italy
- Coordinates: 45.4354°N 12.3322°E
- Current tenants: Museo Fortuny

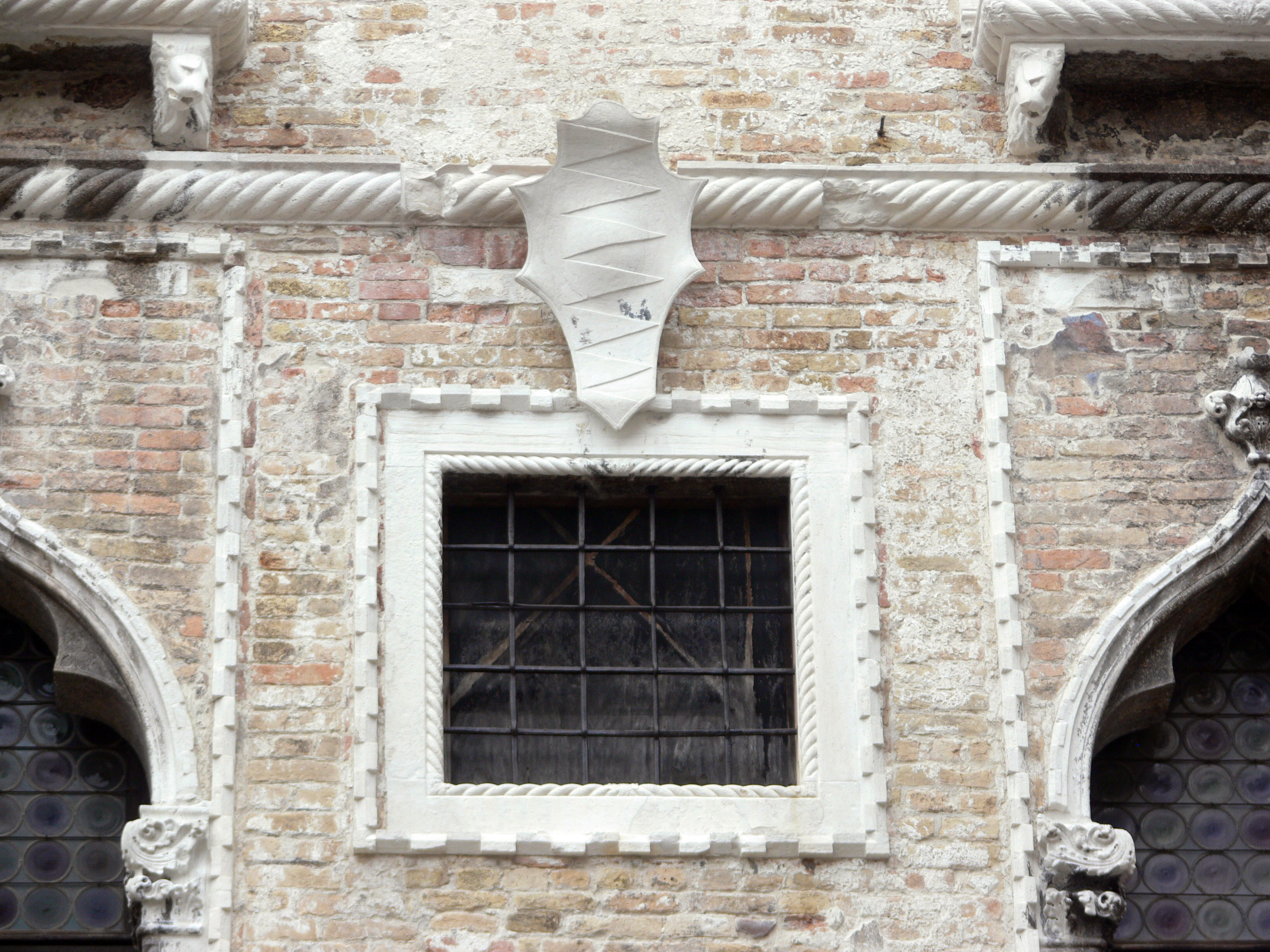
Detail of the façade with the escutcheon of the Pesaro family

The Palazzo Pesaro Orfei or Palazzo Pesaro degli Orfei is a historic palace in Venice, in northern Italy. It was built by the Pesaro family in the fifteenth century in Venetian Gothic style. From 1902 it was the home of Mariano Fortuny and his wife Henriette Negrin. It now houses the Museo Fortuny, and may also be called Palazzo Fortuny.

== History ==
The palace is in the sestiere of San Marco, in the centre of the city, and lies between the Campo San Beneto and the Rio di Ca' Michiel. It has a façade onto each, while the northern façade is on the Calle Pesaro.

It was built in the fifteenth century by Benedetto Pesaro, member of the prominent Pesaro family, and is one of several palaces of that family in the city. (Note: Others include Ca' Pesaro, Palazzo Pesaro Papafava, Palazzo Ravà, and probably the Fondaco dei Turchi.) The San Beneto branch of the family died out towards the end of the seventeenth century, and from about 1720 the palace was let to various tenants, among them a printer – the Tipografia Albrizzi – and two musical associations, first the Accademia degli Orfei from 1786 and then, from 1835, the Società Apollinea. For most of the nineteenth century the building was subdivided and let to various artisans. By the time Mariano Fortuny established his first Venetian studio there, in the last years of the century, there were some 350 tenants. He gradually bought up space, demolishing the later dividing walls and restoring the rooms bit by bit to their earlier form; in 1902 he made it his home. In 1907, together with his future wife Henriette Negrin, he established a small workshop; within a few years, two floors of the palace were devoted to the printing of silk and velvet clothing and textiles.

Fortuny died in 1949, and in 1956 the palace was gifted to the comune of Venice; the comune took full possession only in 1965, after the death of Fortuny's widow Henriette. The Museo Fortuny was opened in 1975.
