= Palazzo Pesaro Papafava =

Italian palace

Coordinates: 45.443255°N 12.33530°E

The Palazzo Pesaro Papafava or Palazzo Papafava is a 15th-century Gothic style palace in the sestiere of Cannaregio of Venice, Italy. Located on the Canale della Misericordia, near the corner with Rio di San Felice; it stands across from the Scuola Grande di Santa Maria della Misericordia.

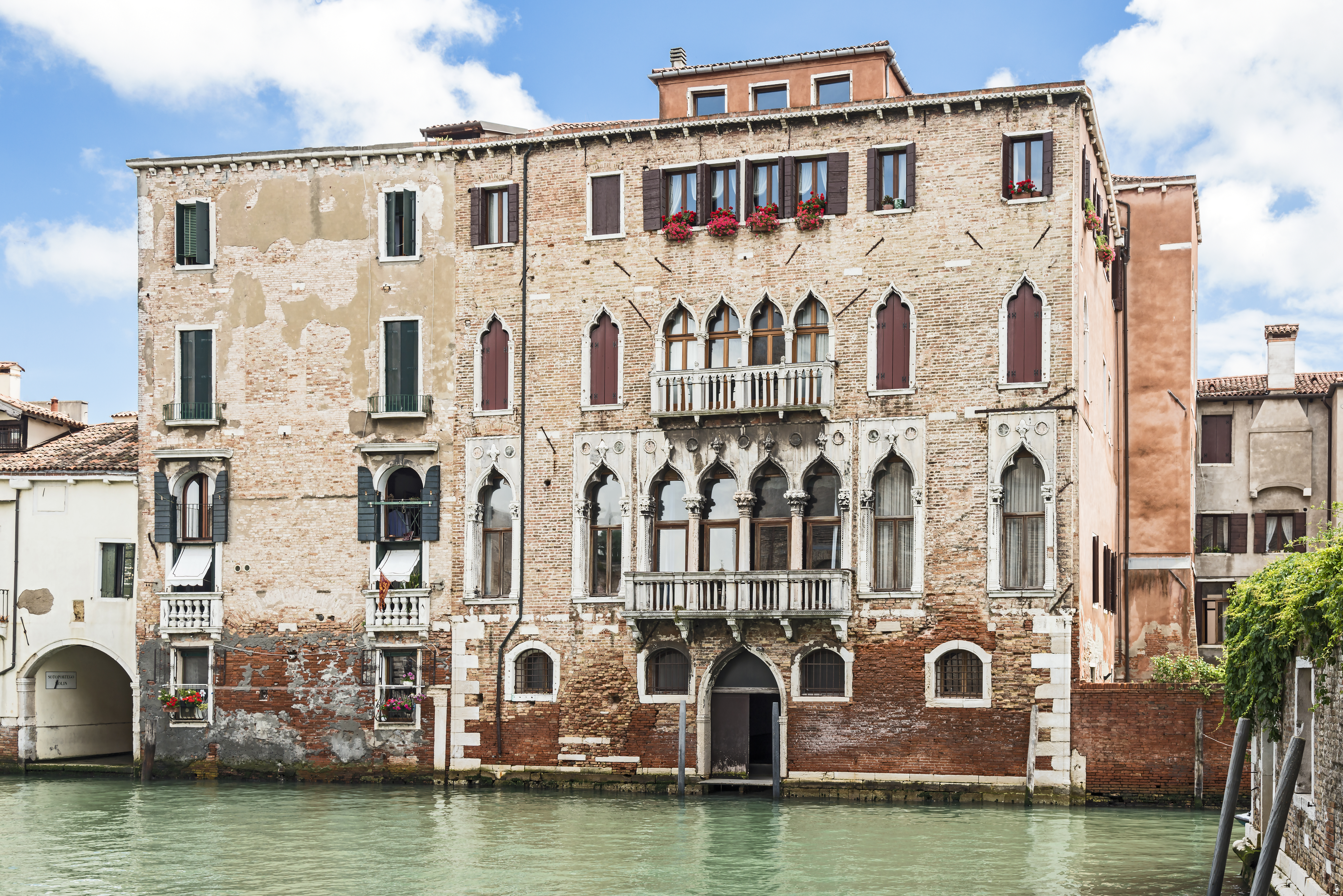
Canal facade

It originally belonged to the Pesaro family in the 14th century, until the marriage of Bonifacio Papafava to Pesarina Pesaro in 1615. The Papafava family originated from Padua; and Bonifacio bought his entry into the Venetian Nobility (Libro d'oro) in 1652. The less decorated lateral wing was a later addition. The Papafava family died out with Giacomo Papafava in 1796.
