= Mariano Fortuny (designer) =

Spanish fashion designer (1871–1949)

Mariano Fortuny y Madrazo
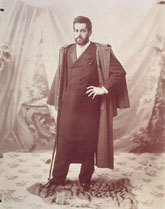
- Mariano Fortuny in 1895
- Born: 11 May 1871; Granada, Spain
- Died: 3 May 1949 (aged 77); Venice, Italy
- Known for: textile design; fashion design
- Spouse: Henriette Negrin

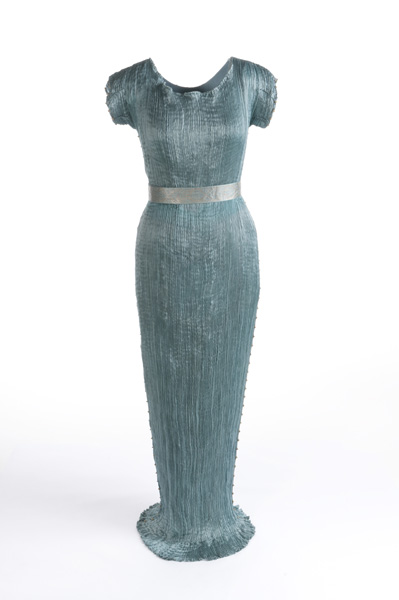
Delphos dress by Henriette Negrin and Mariano Fortuny

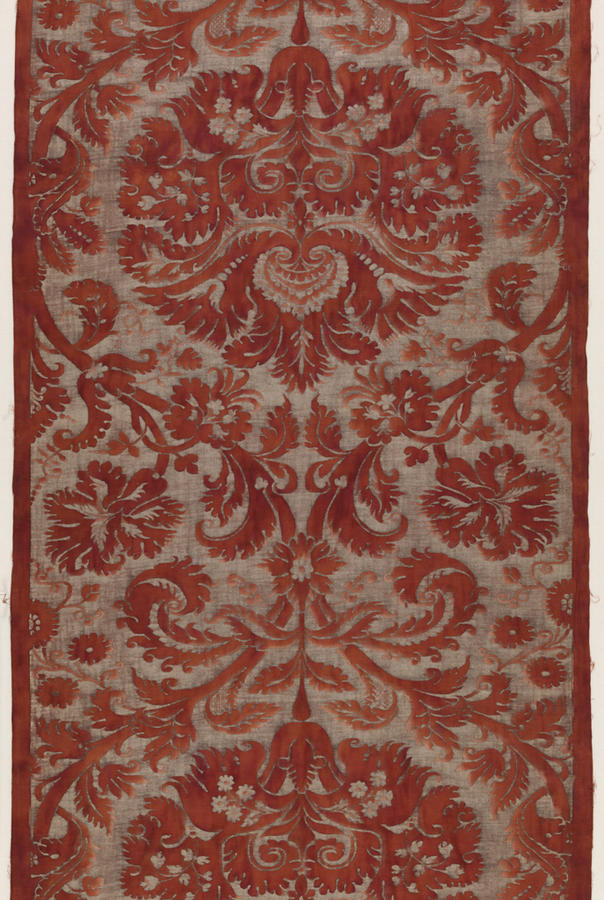
Mariano Fortuny furnishing textile, c.1920

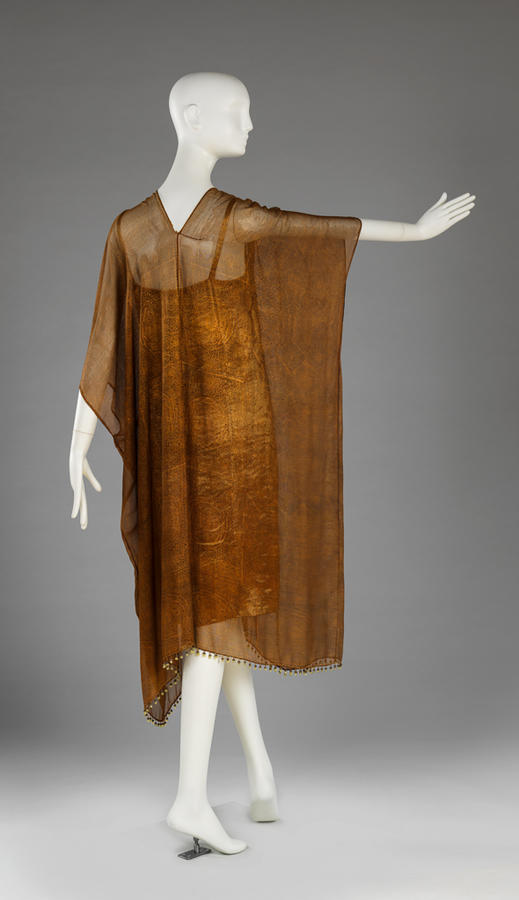
1926 Fortuny gold lamé dress and printed gauze aba style tunic

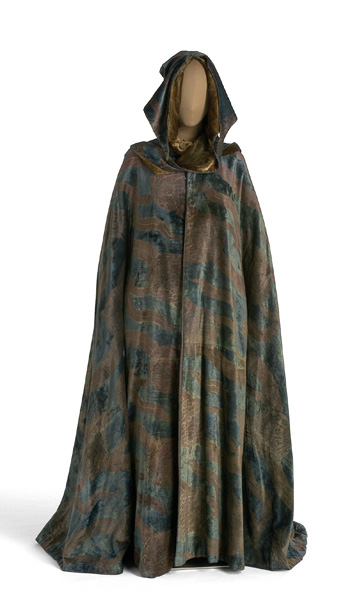
Green silk velvet evening cape.

Mariano Fortuny y Madrazo (Catalan: Marià Fortuny i de Madrazo, pronounced [məɾiˈa fuɾˈtuɲ i ðə məˈðɾaθu]; 11 May 1871 – 3 May 1949) was a Spanish polymath, artist, inventor, and fashion designer who opened his couture house in 1906 and continued until 1946. He was the son of the painter Mariano Fortuny y Marsal.

== Life ==
Fortuny was born on 11 May 1871, to an artistic family in Granada, Spain. His father, a genre painter, died when Fortuny was three years old and his mother, Cecilia, moved the family to Paris, France.

It was apparent at a young age that Fortuny was a gifted artist, showing a talent for painting as well as a passion for textiles. During his childhood he was introduced to many different textiles and fabrics, which greatly imprinted upon his creativity. His parents were passionate about materials and had their own collections of textiles from various shops they had visited in Europe. His father also collected metalwork and armour from previous ages as a hobby. As a young child he was fascinated with all of these textiles and would dye pieces of material for amusement. It was this exposure that led him to designing and producing his own textiles and dresses.

The family moved again in 1889 to Venice, Italy. As a young man, Fortuny travelled throughout Europe seeking out artists he admired, among them the German composer Richard Wagner. Fortuny became quite varied in his talents, which included inventing, painting, photography, sculpting, architecture, etching, and theatrical stage lighting.

In 1897, he met the woman he would marry, Henriette Negrin, in Paris. She came to live with him in 1902, when she filed for divorce from her first husband. They were together for the rest of Fortuny's life, eventually marrying in Paris in 1924. While in Paris, Fortuny registered and patented more than 20 inventions between 1901 and 1934.

He died in his home in Venice and was buried in the Campo Verano in Rome. His work was a source of inspiration to the French novelist Marcel Proust.

== Lighting engineer ==
In 1892, after experiencing some of Richard Wagner's work in Paris, Fortuny traveled to Bayreuth, Germany where Wagner had built a theater specifically designed to put on his operas. He was mesmerized by Wagner's work and began to paint scenes for his operas when he returned to Venice. In Wagnerian drama, painting, architecture, song, dance, and poetry all worked together towards a common goal. This affected Fortuny's outlook and was the inspiration for a brand new type of theater design where the designer and the technician would work together on a project from idea to realization. Fortuny and other followers of this concept believed that one can only improve the quality of a product by having a good knowledge of something's raw materials and the process of its construction. He also thought that the best type of design was created when the artist knew how to realize the design and controlled all of the steps in the creative process.

Through his experiences with Wagner and the theatre, Fortuny became a lighting engineer, architect, inventor, director, and set designer. As a set designer, he wanted to create a more seamless way of transitioning from one scene to another other than flying out a backdrop and bringing in a new one. He began experimenting with light and different ways to do this in the attic of his palazzo in Italy. With his experimentation, he found that reflecting light off different surfaces could change the color, intensity and other properties of light. His 1904 treatise Eclairage Scenique ("Stage Lighting") describes the discovery that formed the basis of his indirect lighting technique. He concluded that, "... it is not the quantity but the quality of light that makes things visible and allows the pupil ... to open properly."

He used these indirect lighting techniques in his new invention, the Fortuny cyclorama dome, a quarter-dome-shaped structure of plaster or cloth. Fortuny first filed a patent for his indirect theatrical lighting system in 1901 and constantly refined his invention thereafter. The shape created the look of a more extensive sky, and Fortuny could create any type of sky he wanted by reflecting light onto it in a certain way. He could even reflect clouds on the backdrop by painting different things on the mirrors that reflected light onto the dome.

During the 1920s, Fortuny's contribution to the theatre gained widespread recognition. After studying and perfecting his dome, its use was becoming more popular in many theatres in Europe. He was soon contracted to install his dome in the famous opera house, La Scala of Milan. However, for this project he was required to make some adaptations for the dome to be used at its maximum potential. The theatre was much larger than his original dome, so he increased the size so that he could allow the dome to fill the space with the stage completely. He also made it so that the dome was "electrically controlled, and could fold and unfold like a giant accordion in the space of 90 seconds. Even more impressively, he invented a suction fan, specifically for this project, which forced out the air to keep the structure taut. From the audience’s point of view, this helped the backdrop’s depth to seem almost infinite, as if you were looking at a night sky that never ended. After all the adaptations were made and the construction was completed, the dome successfully opened on 7 January 1922, with a production of Parsifal.

From the same concept of the dome, Fortuny created a lamp that could be used to recreate indoor lighting onstage, the Fortuny Moda Lamp. Although originally intended for use as a stage lamp and patented in 1903, this lighting fixture remains popular as a floor lamp.

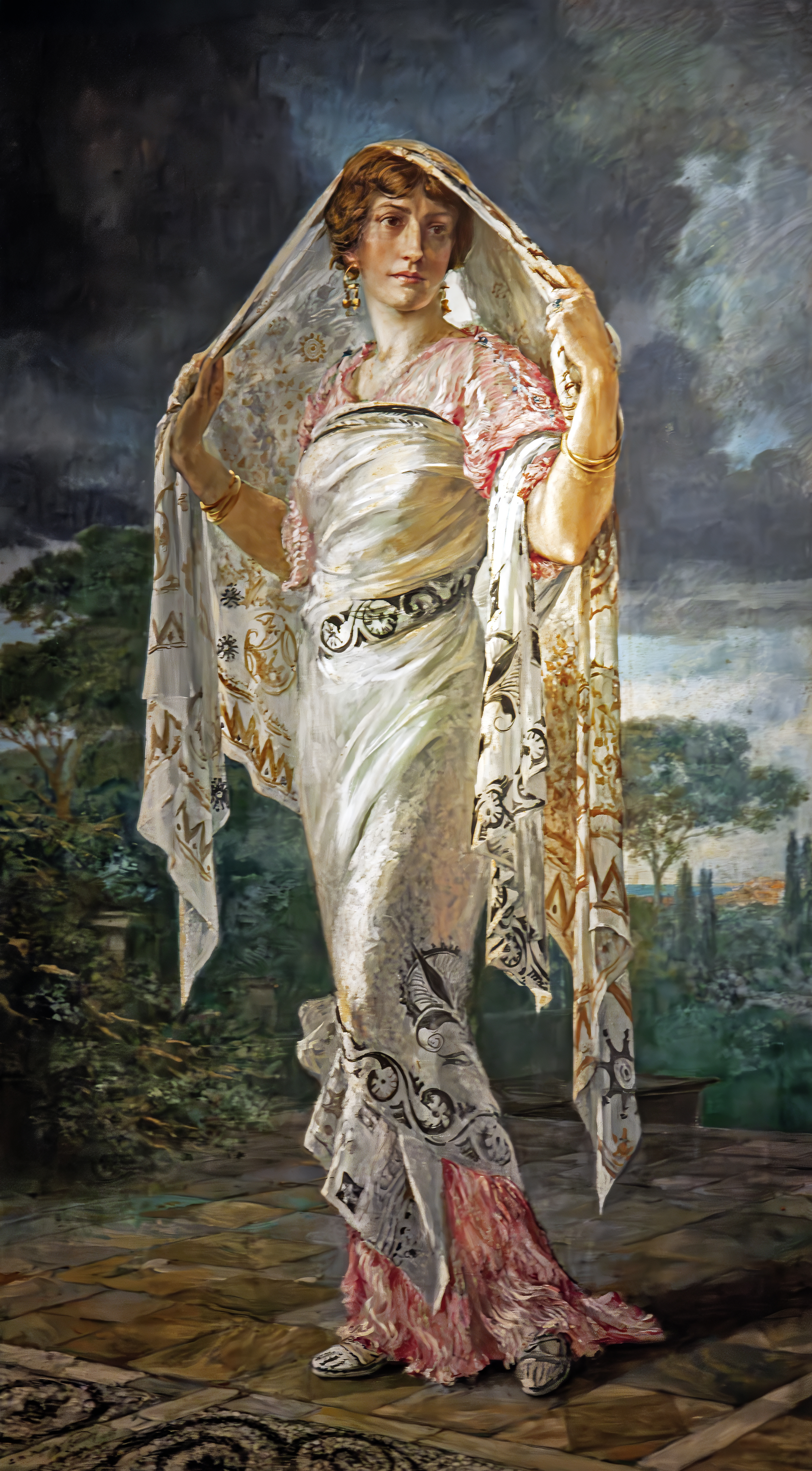
Henriette Fortuny painted by Mariano Fortuny in 1935, in Fortuny garments. (Fortuny Museum)

== Fashion designer ==
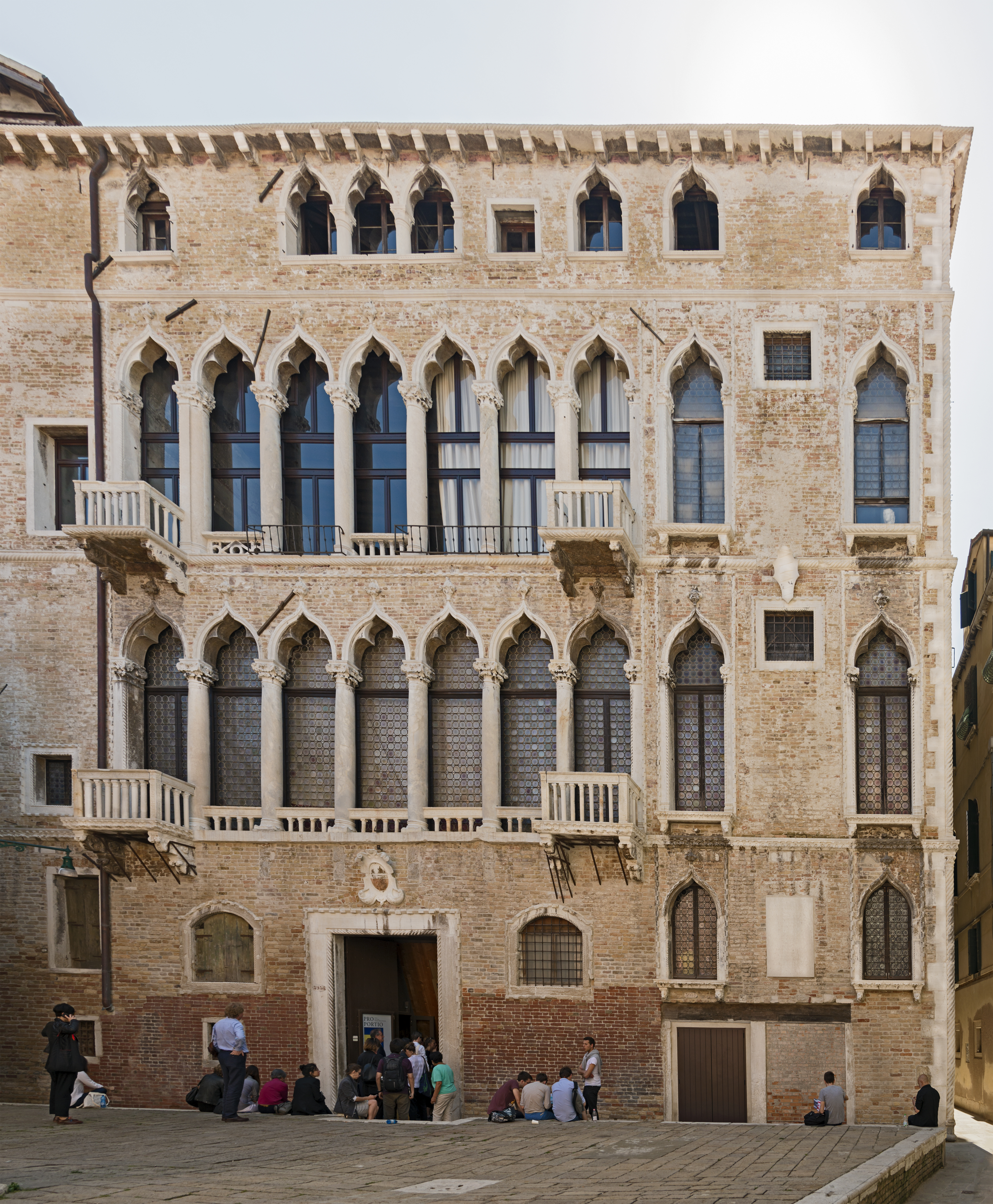
View of the Palazzo Fortuny in Venice where Mariano Fortuny lived and worked

The achievements that Fortuny is most well known for were made in the field of fashion design. His wife, Henriette Negrin, was an experienced dressmaker who helped to construct many of their designs. From 1902 they lived in the Palazzo Pesaro Orfei in Venice, which Fortuny filled with the artwork of his father, art that his father collected, and other art and artefacts that inspired him. He called the palazzo his "think tank" where he had many rooms set up for experiments and inventions as well as rooms for inspiration.

It is not clear if Fortuny had any interest in, or aptitude for, fashion design before meeting Negrin. His first works in fabric appeared after they began cohabitating, and there is little documentation to attest which creations were hers or his - except the silk-pleating process, which was Negrin's invention.

Fortuny and Negrin drew from styles of the past for their fashion design as well, inspired by the light, airy clothing of Greek women that clung to the body and accentuated the natural curves and shape of a woman's body.

Fortuny and Negrin rebelled against the style lines that were popular during his time period, and Henriette created the Delphos gown, a shift dress made of finely pleated silk weighed down by glass beads that held its shape and flowed on the body. No one has been able to recreate pleating as fine as theirs, or that has held its shape like their dresses have for many years. They also manufactured their own dyes and pigments for their fabrics using ancient methods. With these dyes they began printing on velvets and silks and dyed them using a press that they invented with wooden blocks onto which they engraved the pattern. Their dresses are seen as fine works of art today and many survive, still pleated, in museums and personal collections.

In Paris, Fortuny garments were retailed by Babani, who sold Delphos dresses and other garments to the actress Eleonora Duse.

In 2012, the Queen Sofia Spanish Institute in New York City mounted an exhibition of his work.

A wide collection of his work can be seen at the Museo del Traje in Madrid

His clients were Élisabeth, Countess Greffulhe and her daughter Élaine Greffulhe, Eleonora Duse, Ellen Terry and Oona O'Neill.

== Museum ==
The Fortuny Museum is housed in the Venetian Gothic Palazzo Pesaro Orfei in Venice. It contains work by Fortuny in the fields of textile design, fashion design, painting, sculpture, photography and lighting, and also a number of paintings by his father Mariano Fortuny y Marsal.
