= Nick Lamb =

Nick Lamb may refer to:

- Nick Lamb (sculptor)
- Nick Lamb (cricketer)

== See also ==
- Nic Lamb, American surfer, actor, and entrepreneur
