= Juan de Barroeta =

Spanish painter (1835–1906)

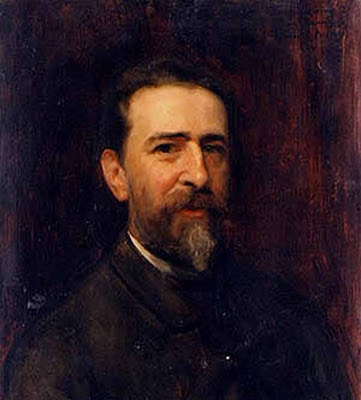
Juan de Barroeta (1884), portrait by Raimundo Madrazo.

Juan de Barroeta y Anguisolea (10 October 1835 – 10 April 1906) was a Spanish painter of Basque ancestry; best known for his portraits.

== Biography ==
He was born in Bilbao. His father was a decorative painter and gave him his first lessons. In 1850, he moved to Madrid to enroll at the Real Academia de Bellas Artes de San Fernando, where he studied with Federico de Madrazo, who had a great influence on his style. While there, he associated with a group of poets and writers and helped them launch a journal called El Precursor. In 1856, he was a participant in the first National Exhibition of Fine Arts, winning third place for his version of the Raising of Lazarus.

In 1855, he tried to win a scholarship to the Spanish Academy of Fine Arts in Rome, but was unsuccessful. After a second failed effort in 1859, he returned to Bilbao, where he quickly established himself as a popular portrait artist; winning commissions from many notable members of the Basque community.

In 1865, he painted "imaginary portraits" of the Visigothic kings Leovigildo and Chindasvinto for a history of the kings of Spain. He also provided illustrations for several periodicals, including La Ilustración Española y Americana, as well as doing the posters and set decorations for productions of the operas Faust and Roberto Devereux.

He was active in liberal politics and fought to defend his hometown in the Siege of Bilbao, during the Third Carlist War. He also painted numerous battle scenes from the war. In 1875, however, he still agreed to paint a portrait of King Alfonso XII on behalf of the "Diputación Foral de Vizcaya". He died in Bilbao, aged 70.

Notable for his Realistic style, many of his works have a photographic quality. Most of his approximately 270 portraits are in private collections, but many of his other works may be seen in the Museo de Bellas Artes de Bilbao.

== Selected paintings ==
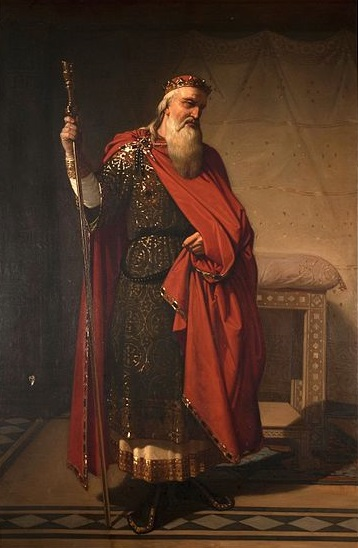
Portrait of Chindasvinto

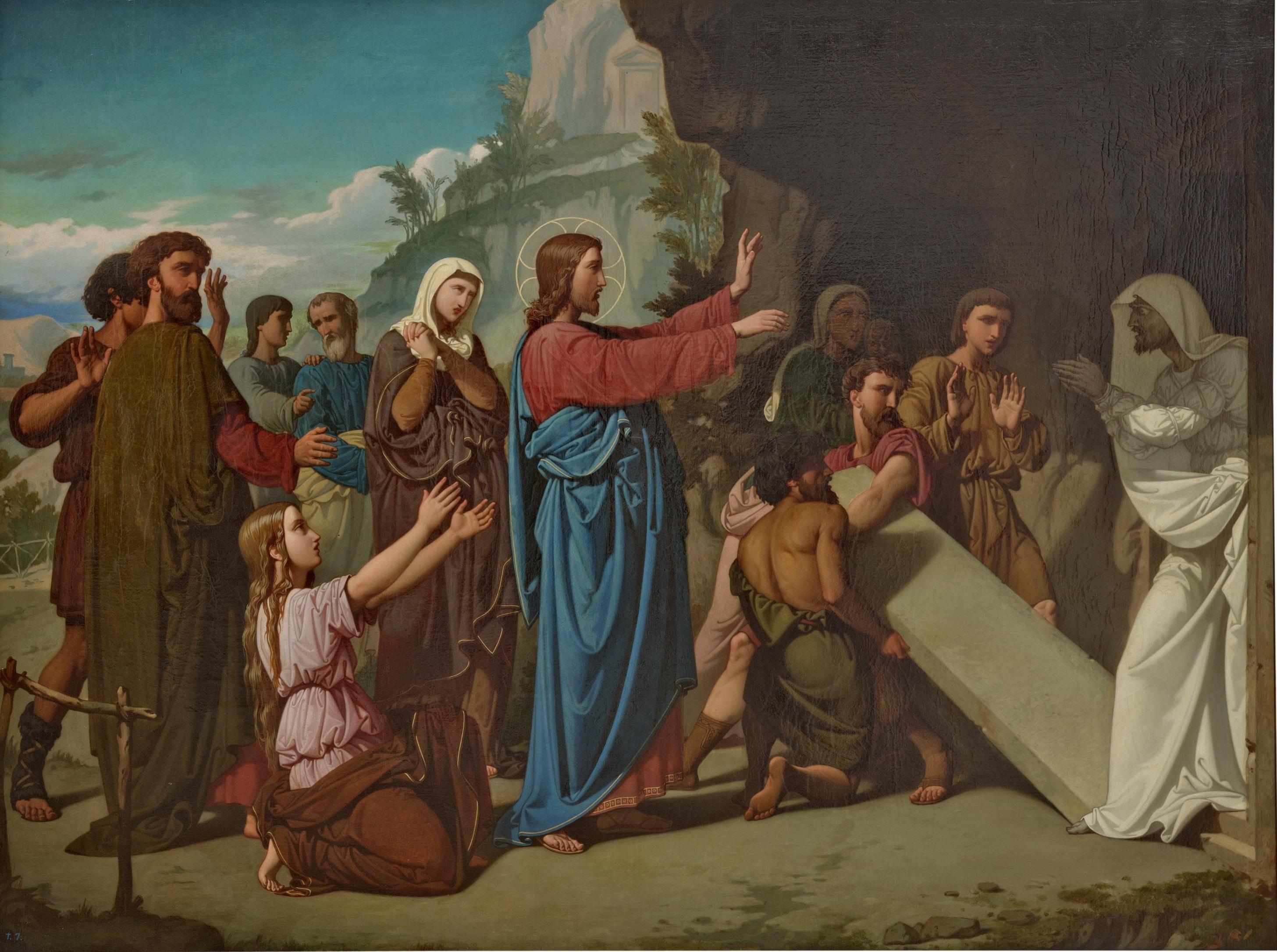
The Raising of Lazarus

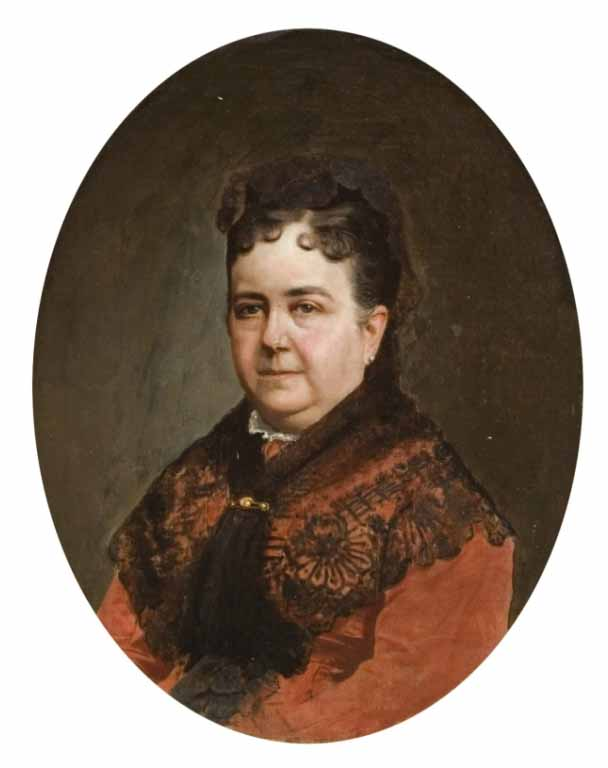
Portrait of Doña Lorenza San Gil

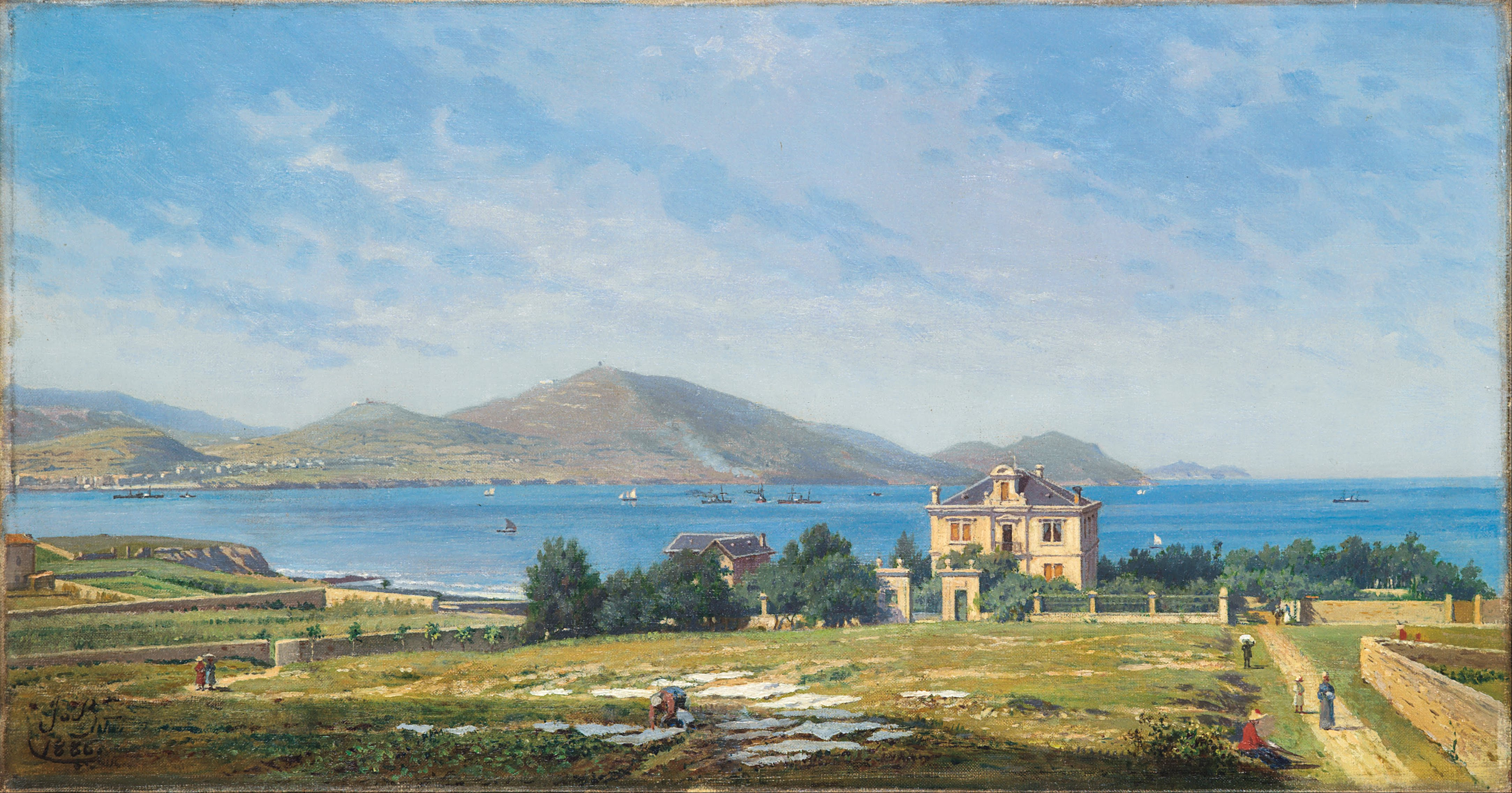
View of El Abra
