= Le Dieu bleu =

1912 ballet in one act choreographed by Michel Fokine

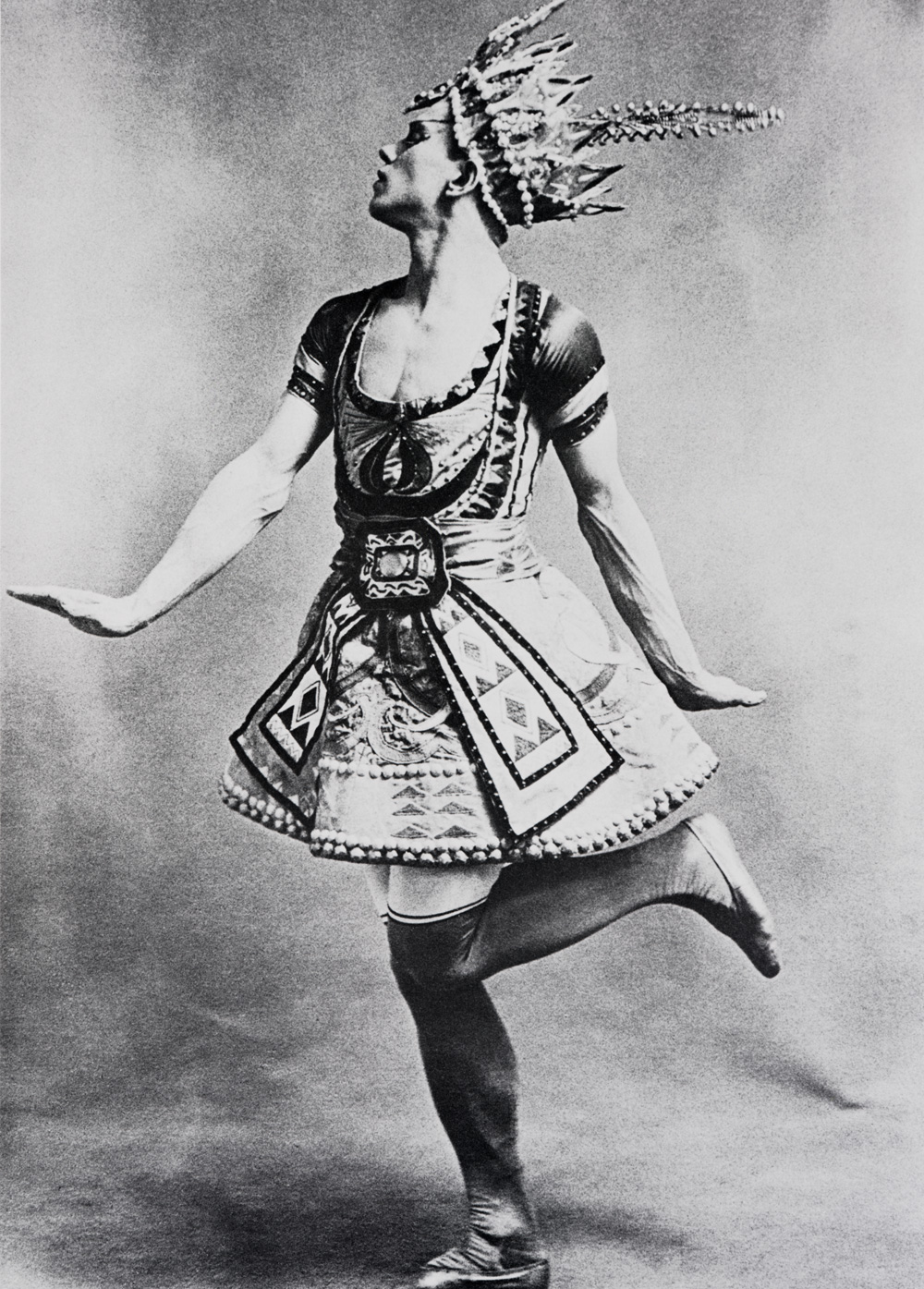
- Nijinsky as The Blue God
- Choreographer: Michel Fokine
- Music: Reynaldo Hahn
- Libretto: Jean Cocteau; Federico de Madrazo y Ochoa
- Based on: Original story
- Premiere: 13 May 1912; Théâtre du Châtelet; Paris
- Original ballet company: Diaghilev's Ballets Russes
- Characters: The Young Man; The Young Girl; The Goddess; The Blue God; The High Priest; The Drunken Temple Dancer
- Design: Léon Bakst
- Setting: India
- Created for: Nijinsky

Le Dieu bleu is a ballet in one act choreographed by Michel Fokine to music by Reynaldo Hahn, set to a libretto by Jean Cocteau and Federico de Madrazo y Ochoa. Léon Bakst designed the sets and costumes.

The ballet was a failure at the premiere in Paris, on 13 May 1912 at the Théâtre du Châtelet. Le Dieu bleu was staged three times in Paris in 1912, three times in London in 1913, and revived in London in April 2011 with music cobbled together from the works of Scriabin and with choreography by Wayne Eagling. The revival was not a success.

== Background ==
Ballet impresario and producer Sergei Diaghilev staged two exotic ballets for the Ballets Russes: Cléopâtre in 1909 and Scheherazade in 1910, both great successes with the Parisian public. He hoped that Le Dieu bleu (another exotic ballet) would be equally successful.

It was one of six new ballets for the 1912 Ballets Russes season. The others were Prélude à l'après-midi d'un faune, La Péri, Daphnis et Chloé, Thamar based on Balakirev's Tamara, and Sadko. Michel Fokine choreographed all of them, while Léon Bakst designed the sets and costumes for the first four. When Fokine and Bakst started work on Ida Rubinstein's ballet, Le Martyre de Saint Sébastien, Diaghilev felt betrayed. He pushed Dieu forward to 1912 although he lost interest in the ballet and spent huge amounts of money on the production in the hope that Dieu would make Vaslav Nijinsky a great international star.

Fokine started work on Dieu in St. Petersburg in the winter of 1911–1912. He based some of his ideas for the ballet on the dances of the Royal Siamese Court ballet. This company had danced in St. Petersburg in 1900. Fokine also studied the arts of India, but in the end his dances for Dieu were uninspired and dull.

Hahn's music could have been the reason, as it was not very good. Prince Lieven, a critic and historian of the Ballets Russes, said the music had no interest or importance but only that it was "sweet and insipid." Bakst based his ideas for the sets and costumes on the posters and printed materials for the Cambodian Ballet's 1906 productions in France.

== Premiere ==
The ballet was first presented by Diaghilev's Ballets Russes in Paris at the Théâtre du Châtelet on 13 May 1912, coupled with another ballet, Thamar. Both ballets were failures. Diaghilev was shocked by the failure of Thamar. He thought it would be another success like Scheherazade. He was not surprised that Dieu was a failure and privately blamed Hahn's music for it. He was forced to use it because Hahn had rich friends in Paris, who would have cut their support of the Ballets Russes if the music had been rejected.

The ballet was created for Nijinsky, who had yet to dance an important part for the Ballets Russes. He was cast in the lead role. Other dancers in the ballet were Max Frohman as The Young Man, Tamara Karsavina as The Young Girl, Lydia Nelidova as The Goddess, and Michel Federov as The High Priest. Nijinsky's sister Bronislava Nijinska was cast as The Drunken Temple Dancer.

== Plot ==
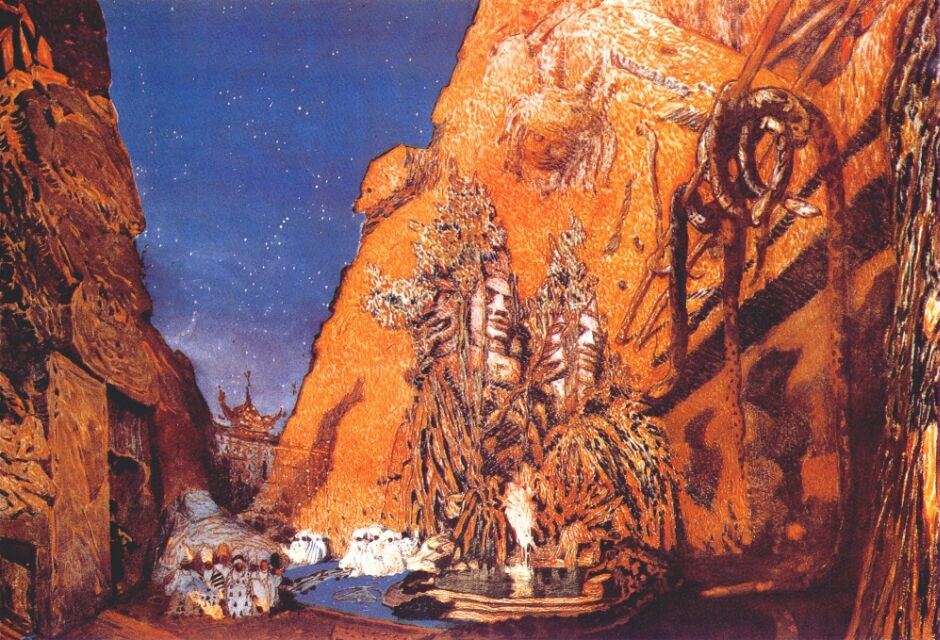
Set design by Bakst

The curtain rises on a warm evening in India, centuries in the past. In front of a rock temple, a pool is seen with a lotus on the surface of the water. Snakes, tortoises, and other animals rest near the pool. The temple walls are covered with masses of flowering plants.

A crowd is waiting for a ceremony to begin. The Young Man is about to become a priest of the temple. The Young Girl runs in and kneels at his feet. She does not want him to desert her for the priesthood and dances before him. The priests are shocked and lead The Young Man away while The Young Girl is prepared for death.

The gates are shut. The Young Girl tries to escape, but monsters rise from a place beneath a trap door. The Goddess rises from the lotus. The Blue God rises from the pool, and calms the monsters with his flute. The monsters are trapped by the masses of plants. The Blue God's work is done.

The priests enter. They are surprised to see The Young Girl still alive and fall on their knees before her. The Young Man rejoins The Young Girl. The Goddess orders a golden staircase to descend from the heavens. The Blue God flies up the staircase and disappears into the clouds.

== Reception ==
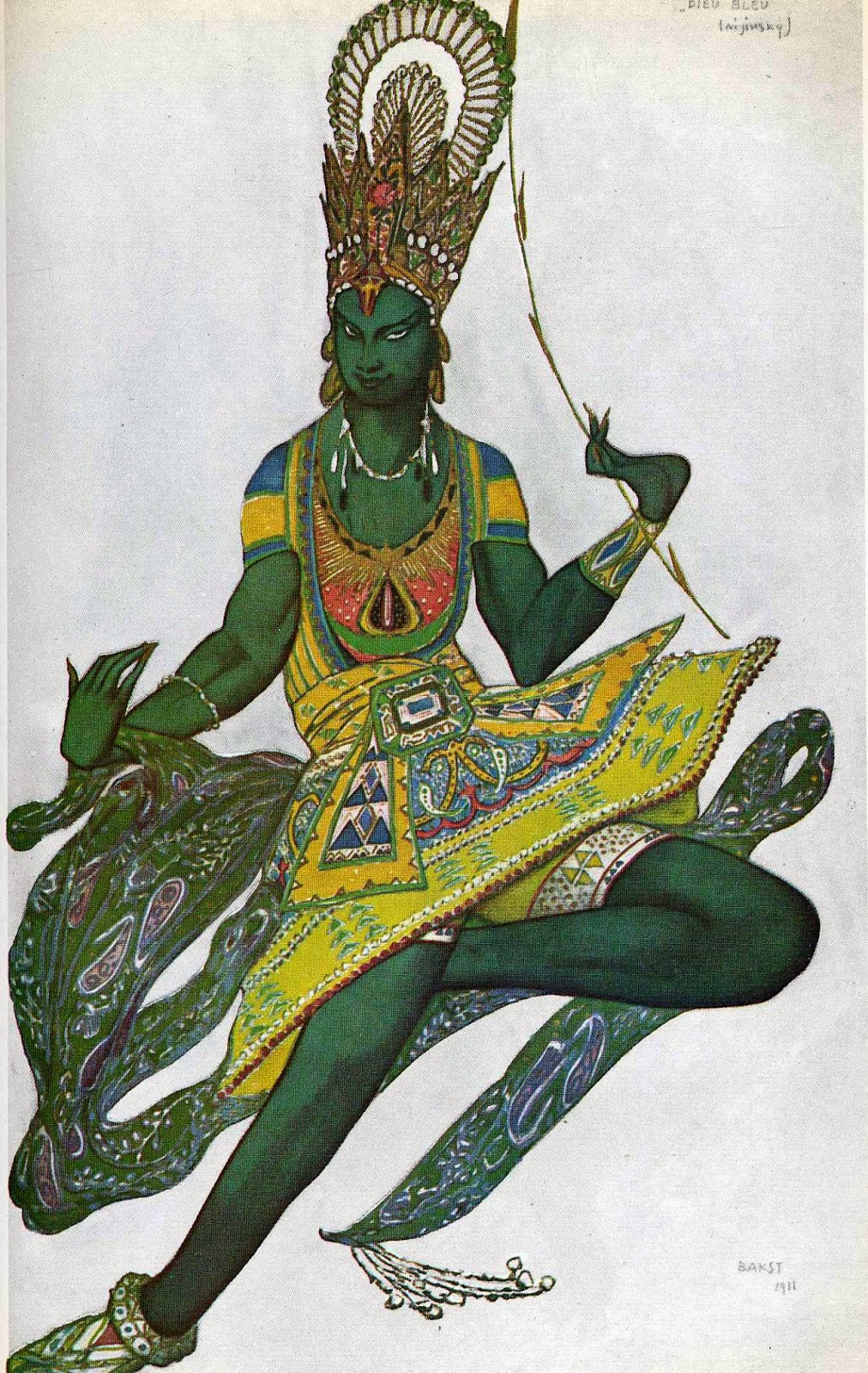
Bakst's costume design for The Blue God

Diaghilev hoped that Dieu would be a great success. Critics thought Nijinsky posed more than he danced. What they liked the most about the ballet was Bakst's sets and costumes. Valery Svetlov wrote in the Mercure de France on 15 May 1912 that Dieu was "a failure in every sense of the word."
