= Federico de Madrazo y Ochoa =

Spanish painter

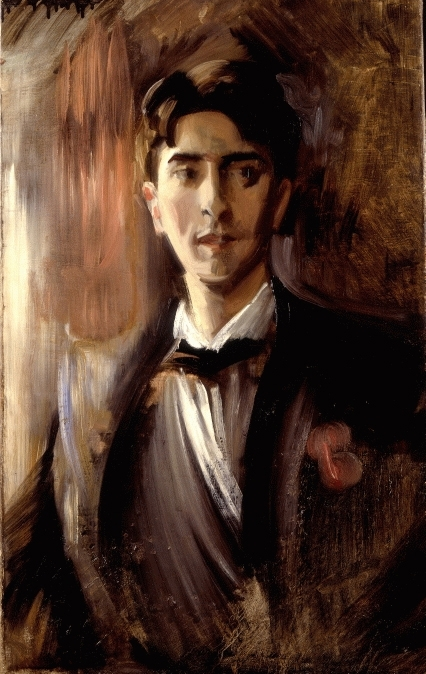
Portrait of Jean Cocteau (1912)

Federico de Madrazo y Ochoa (1875, Rome – 1934, Madrid) was a Spanish painter working mostly in and around Madrid, although he also spent some time in Paris.

He was part of a famous family of Spanish artists which included his father Raimundo de Madrazo, his uncle Ricardo de Madrazo, his grandfather, Federico de Madrazo, and his great grandfather José de Madrazo.

He worked together with Jean Cocteau to write a ballet, Le Dieu bleu (The Blue God), in 1912 for Serge Diaghilev's Ballets Russes. Music for the ballet was composed by Reynaldo Hahn. He also painted Cocteau's most familiar portrait.
