= Punta Galea =

Coordinates: 43.373°N 3.036°W

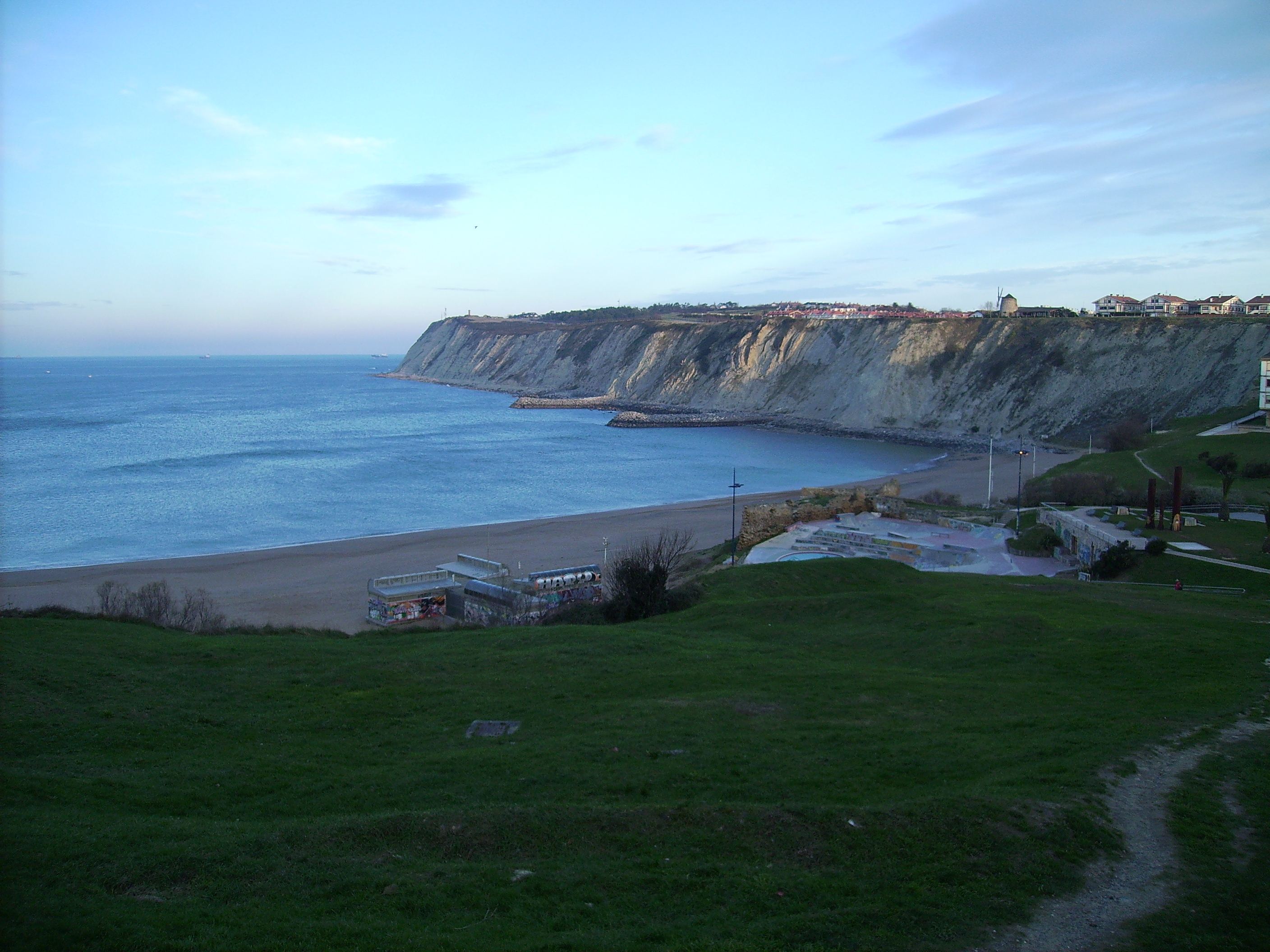
Bird eye view of Arrigunaga eta Galea landscape

Punta Galea is a cape in Biscay, Basque Country, that stands in the limit of Getxo and Sopelana. Together with Punta Lucero delimits the area of the Abra bay and the Estuary of Bilbao.

Punta Galea was also a pop group from Getxo.

== Punta Galea Challenge ==
During the 2014-5 World Surf League's (WSL) inaugural Big Wave World Tour (BWWT), the Punta Galea Challenge was one of the three possible northern hemisphere surfing locations. The others were the Pe'ahi Challenge in Maui, Hawaii, and the Todos Santos Challenge near Ensenada, Mexico. (Note: The southern hemisphere locations were Punta de Lobos, Pichilemu, Chile; Pico Alto, Punta Hermosa, Lima, Peru; and Dungeons, Cape Town, South Africa. Pico Alto was the only southern hemisphere place to host a BWWT event that season with Makua Rothman winning, Anthony Tashnick placing second, and Shawn Dollar taking third.) 30-foot-and-larger waves were needed for the Northern Hemisphere window which ran from October 15, 2014, to February 28, 2015. Punta Galea was the only Northern Hemisphere location to host a BWWT event that season with Nic Lamb, USA, winning the event and Makua Rothman, Hawaii, taking second place on December 11, 2014. Perfect 10 rides were scored by Natxo Gonzalez in the first heat of the semifinals and by Nic Lamb in the finals.

Results of 2014-5 WSL BWT Punta Galea Challenge

Overall finish	Surfer	First round	Semifinals	Finals	BWT points	Prize money
1	Nic Lamb (USA)	26.69	21.21	29.77	10,000	$18,750
2	Makua Rothman (HAW)	16.80	22.27	28.60	8,333	$12,000
3	Nathan Fletcher (USA)	19.37	25.33	25.67	6,944	$7,500
4	Gabriel Villaran (PER)	16.36	16.19	23.69	5,787	$5,250
5	Natxo Gonzalez (ESP)	13.00	29.33	16.00	4,823	$2,250
6	Patrick Gudauskas (USA)	21.51	26.37	8.00	4,019	$2,250
