= Bilbao Abra =

Part of the Bay of Biscay in Spain

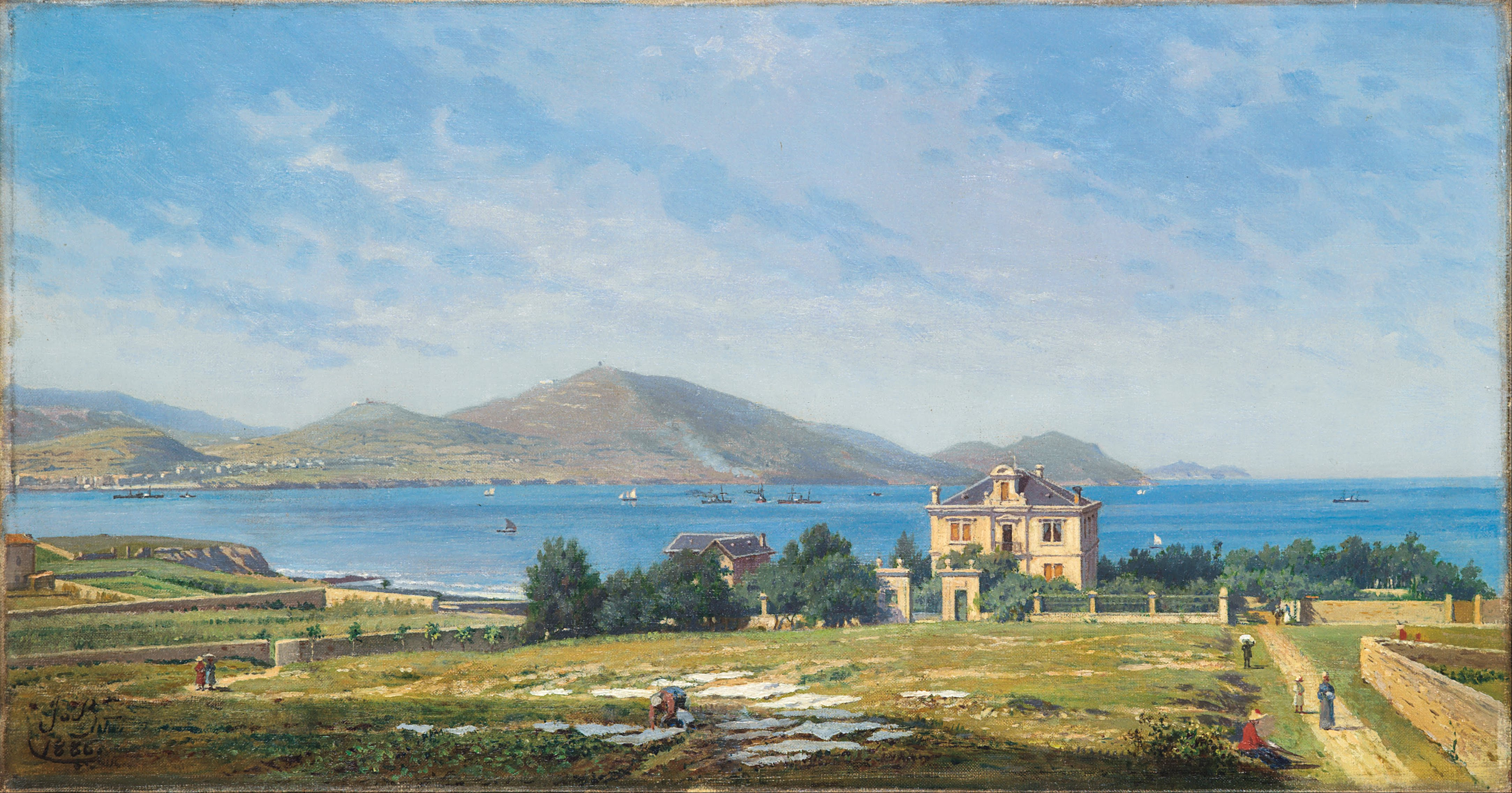
View of El Abra, by Juan de Barroeta

The Bilbao Abra is a bay of the Bay of Biscay, in the Atlantic Ocean, that is located at the mouth of the Estuary of Bilbao, in Biscay (Spain). The bay is delimited by the capes of Punta Galea to the north and Punta Lucero to the south. The inner part of the bay is enclosed by the docks of the Port of Bilbao and in the outer south shores new docks are being built.

The shores of the bay are bordered by the municipalities of Santurtzi and Zierbena to the south and Getxo to the north.

The bay has three beaches, all in Getxo: Las Arenas, Ereaga and Arrigunaga.
