= Nic Lamb =

American surfer

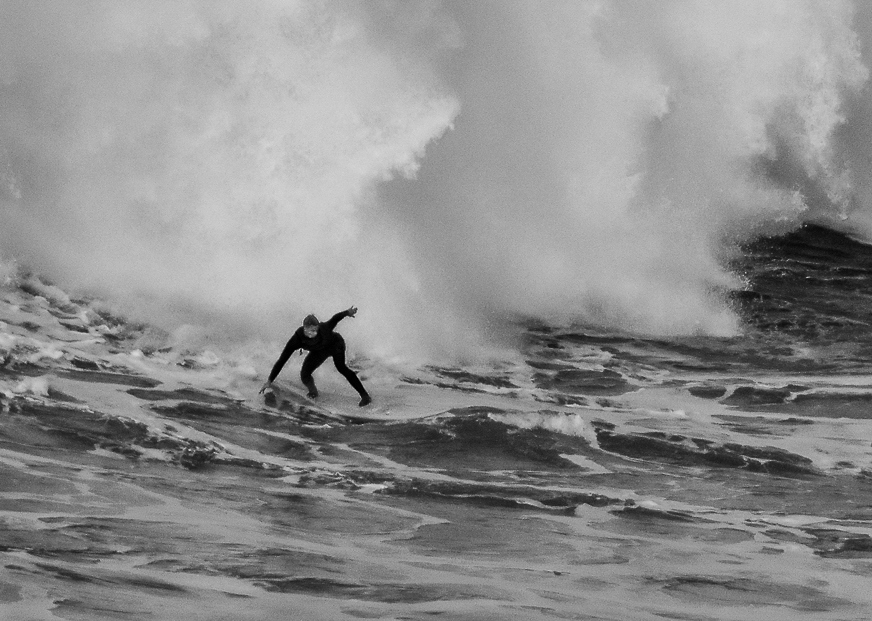

Nic Lamb (born January 18, 1988, in Santa Cruz, California) is an American professional surfer, actor, and entrepreneur. He has won several surfing competitions including the Titans of Mavericks in 2016 and the Punta Galea Challenge in Spain consecutively in 2014 and again in 2017.
