= Nick Lamb (sculptor) =

British artist

Nick Lamb (born 1948 in Cambridge, England) is a sculptor specialising in the Japanese art form of netsuke. One of a handful of non-Japanese carvers of netsuke, Lamb has built a reputation since the 1980s as one of the best living practitioners of this art. He is known for meticulous, graceful carvings, typically of animals. His preferred medium for carving is boxwood. Lamb was born in 1948 in Cambridge, England, and educated at Berkshire College, Maidenhead, Berkshire, England. He originally trained as a graphic designer, and was introduced to netsuke by someone who had seen a miniature carving he had done as a pastime. He began to carve full-time in 1988 and moved to the United States in 1995 to be closer to fellow carvers and netsuke collectors.

Lamb says of his own work, "I work principally in wood, a material expressive of the natural world and living subjects that have always drawn me. Although I do work on a large scale, I am most comfortable carving intricate miniature sculptures that convey the precious quality and fragile existence that wild animals possess. Whether mammals, fish, birds, or insects, I compose my work around graceful unifying lines suggesting the interconnectedness of all life. In part because I am not Japanese, I have been more free to stretch the boundaries of the netsuke art form, which, like many Asian art forms, is highly bound by conventions that evolve minimally over long periods of time. Since 2001, I have been developing stylistically away from the rather traditional forms I have been following. I continue to be influenced by Japanese design, but now investigate different ways in which to apply my personal aesthetic interpretation—my East-West hybrid—to larger format, particularly casting in bronze and stone-carving." Lamb has created larger scale work for Turtle Bay Exploration Park in Redding, California, and the Yellowstone Art Museum in Billings, Montana.

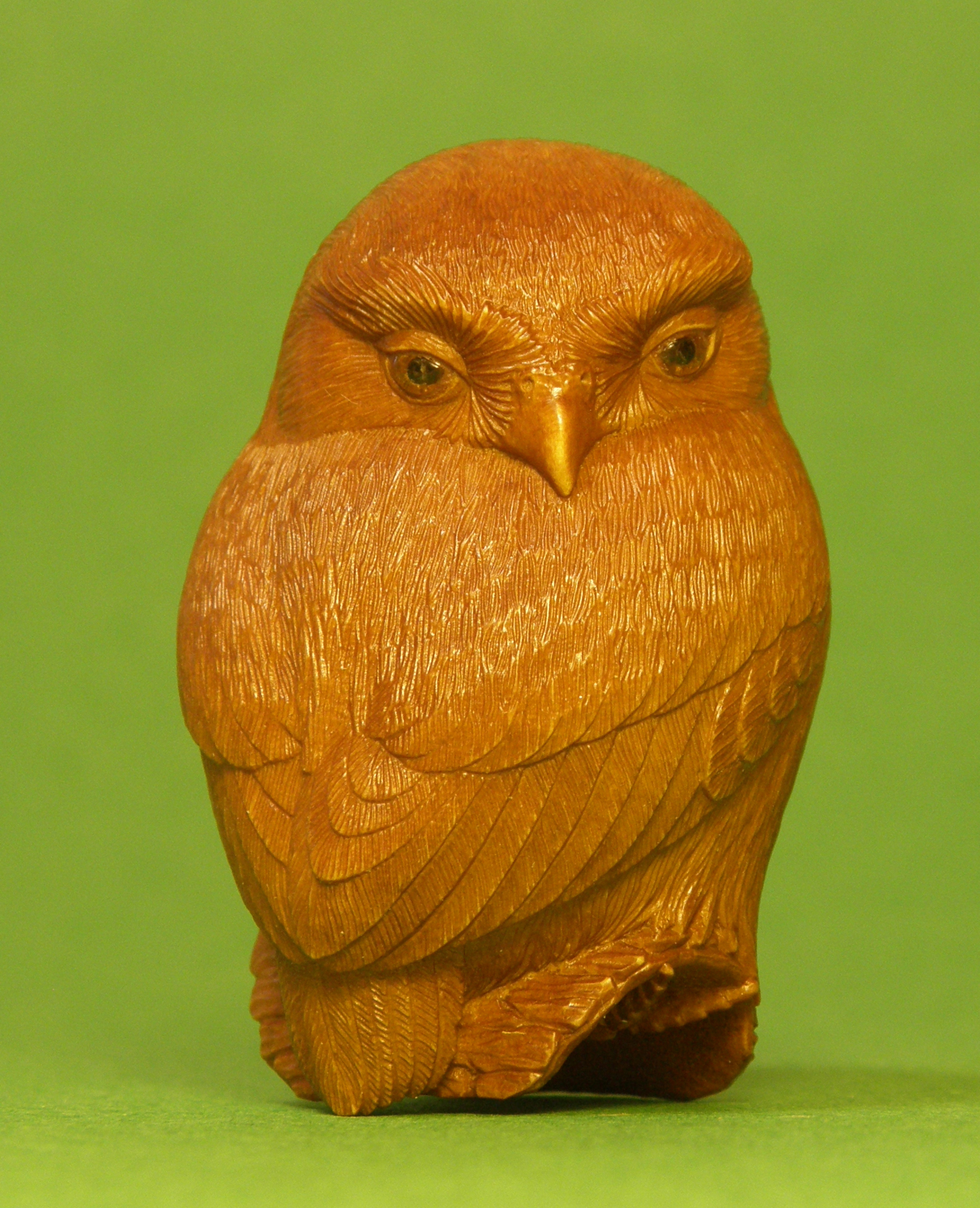
Nick Lamb, "Pygmy Owl"

The group of non-Japanese netsuke carvers is small but distinguished and includes David Carlin, Clive Hallam, Janel Jacobson, Gerry Milazzo, Lynn Richardson, Leigh Sloggett, Gregg Stradiotto, and Sue Wraight, among others.

Lamb is represented by Stewart-Kummer Gallery in Gualala, California, and shows work at Japanese art venues worldwide. His work has been included in temporary exhibitions in the US and Japan, including the Museum of Arts & Design in New York city, the Minneapolis Institute of Arts, the Herbert F. Johnson Museum of Art at Cornell University, the Santa Barbara Museum of Art, and the Bowers Museum in California. His work is in many private collections, including that of the Imperial Family of Japan, the Robin Lehman Collection, the Robert O. Kinsey Collection, and the Tokyo National Museum.

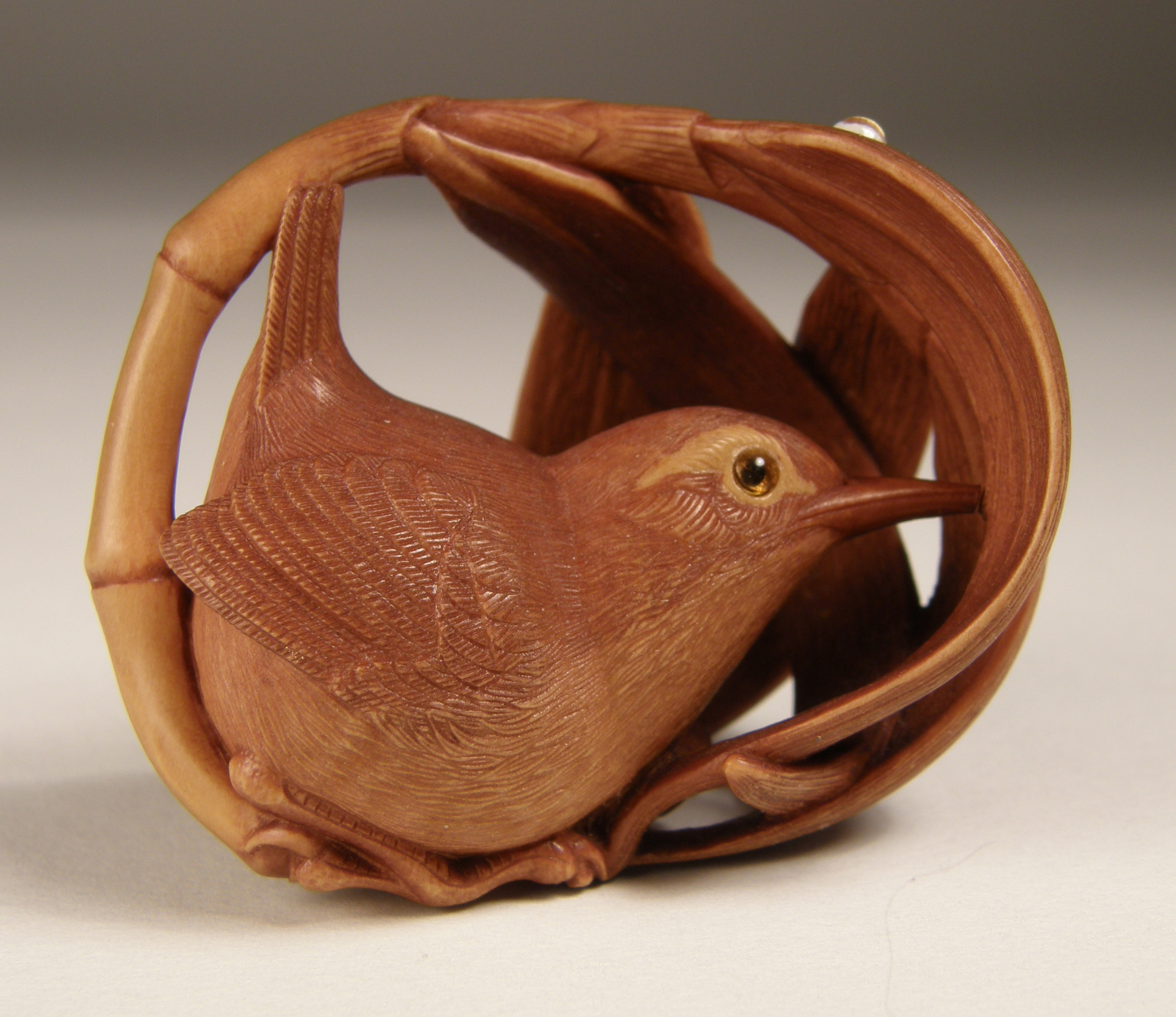
Nick Lamb, "Winter Wren"
