= Raimundo de Madrazo y Garreta =

Spanish painter (1841–1920)

Raimundo de Madrazo
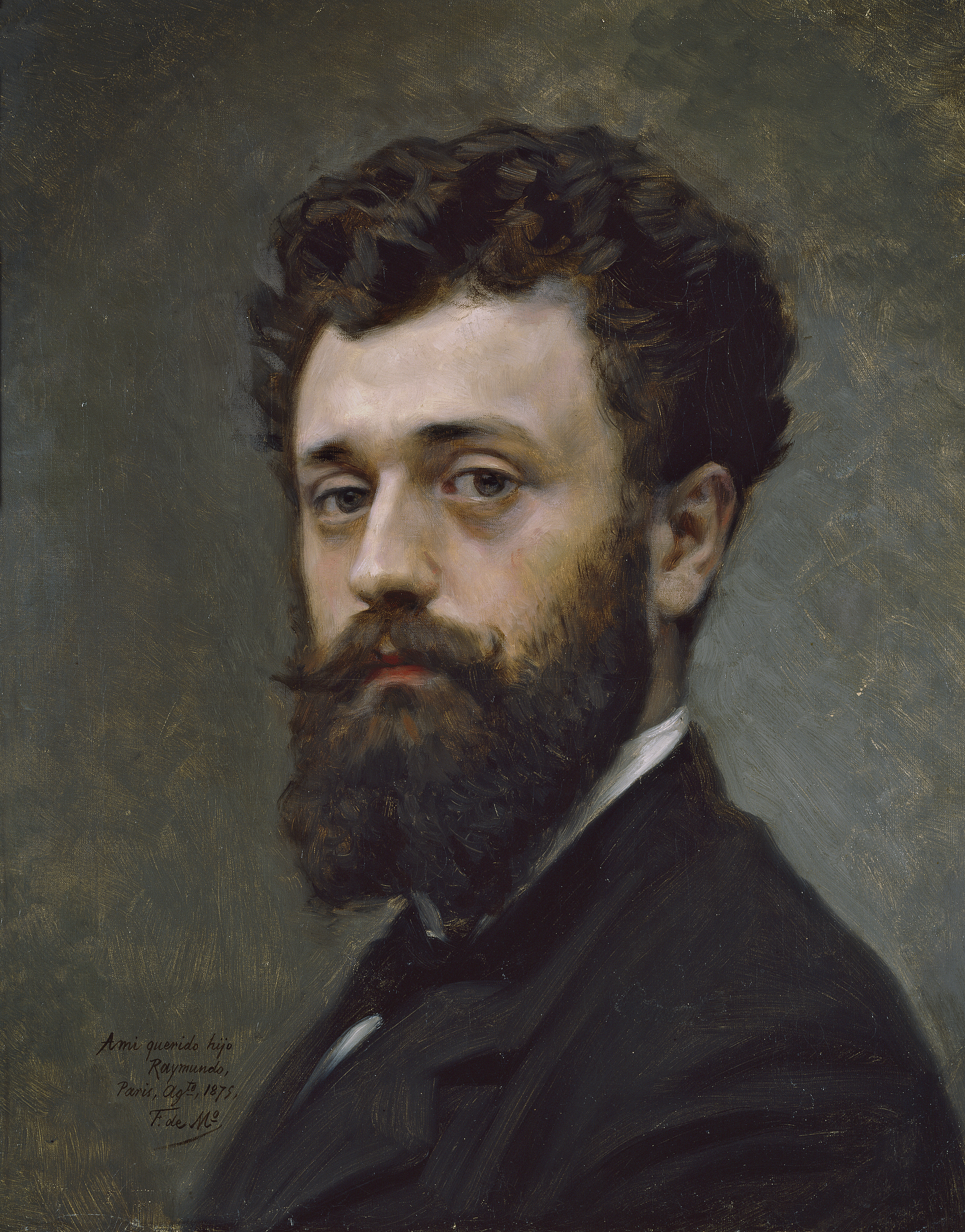
- Raimundo de Madrazo y Garreta, by his father (Federico de Madrazo)
- Born: Raimundo de Madrazo y Garreta; 24 July 1841; Rome, Papal States (now Italy)
- Died: 15 September 1920 (aged 79); Versailles, France
- Education: Real Academia de Bellas Artes de San Fernando; École des Beaux-Arts
- Known for: Painting
- Movement: Realism

Raimundo de Madrazo y Garreta (24 July 1841 – 15 September 1920) was a Spanish painter from the Madrazo family of artists who worked in the Realistic style, although his later work shows signs of Rococo and Japanese influence. He was known primarily for his genre paintings and portraits. His grandfather was José de Madrazo, his father was the portrait painter Federico de Madrazo and his brother was Ricardo de Madrazo.

== Biography ==
He was born in Rome into a family of artists with a noble background. His grandfather was José de Madrazo, the painter and former Director of the Museo del Prado; his father was Federico de Madrazo, also a painter; his uncles were Luis de Madrazo, a painter, Pedro de Madrazo, an art critic and Juan de Madrazo, an architect; while his brother was Ricardo de Madrazo, also a painter. His maternal grandfather was Tadeusz Kuntze, a Polish painter. The Madrazo family have been described as one of the most important painting dynasties, who literally dominated 19th-century painting in Spain.

His first lessons came from his father and grandfather. Later, he attended the Real Academia de Bellas Artes de San Fernando, where he studied with Carlos Luis de Ribera and Carlos de Haes. He settled in Madrid and completed his education with a visit to Paris in 1860; taking lessons from Léon Cogniet and coming under the influence of his friend Alfred Stevens.

He had his first exhibition that same year and often visited New York to sell his paintings. Among his clients there were the Vanderbilt family and Alexander Turney Stewart. He rarely had exhibitions in Spain. In 1882 he, Stevens, Giuseppe de Nittis and Georges Petit established an "International Painting Exhibition" to promote foreign artists living in Paris.

He was a frequent exhibitor at the Paris Salon, won a major medal at the Exposition Universelle (1889) and was a regular at the salon of Madeleine Lemaire. The model for nearly all of the female figures in his genre paintings was Aline Masson, the daughter of the doorman at the Paris residence of the Marqués de Casa Riera.

After 1862, he lived in Paris for much of his life. In the late 1860s, he spent some time in Rome with his brother, working in the studios of Mariano Fortuny, who had married their sister Cecilia. During the Franco-Prussian War, he lived in Granada. His wife died during childbirth in 1874, the same year as his brother-in-law, Fortuny.

In 1894, he donated a collection of works by Francisco de Goya that he had acquired in 1869 to the Museo del Prado. In 1914, he moved to Versailles, where he died six years later. His son, Federico de Madrazo y Ochoa (known as "Coco") also became a notable painter.

== Selected paintings ==
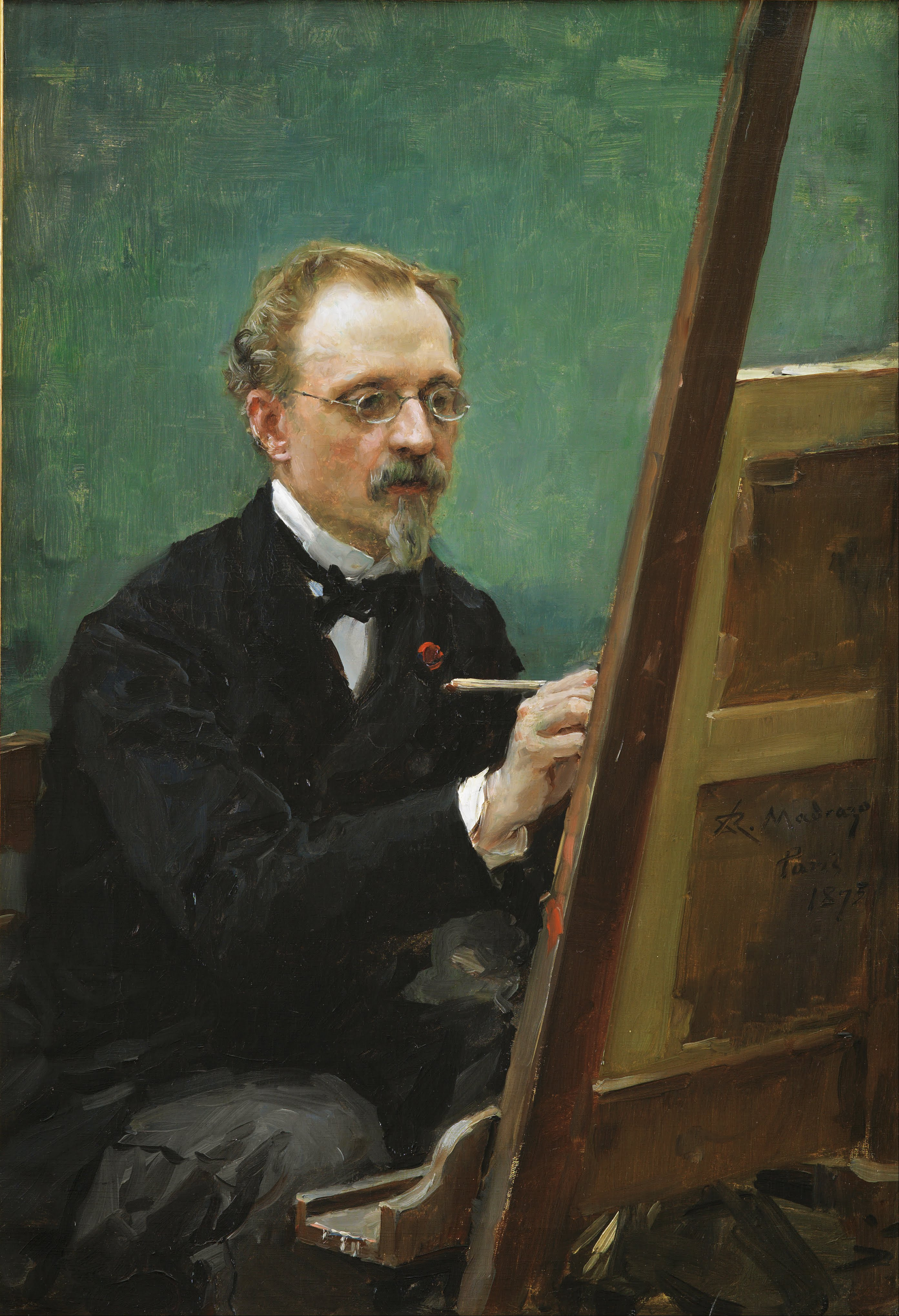
Portrait of Federico de Madrazo Painting, 1875

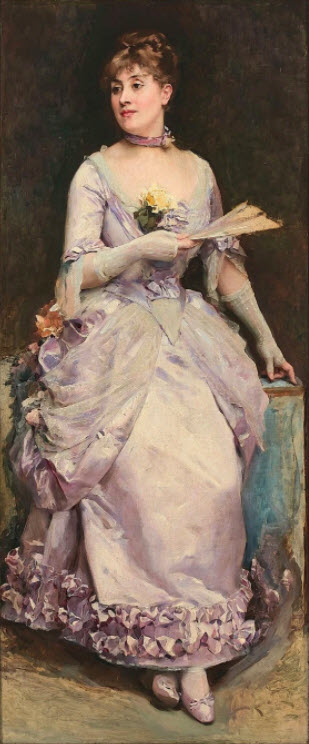
Portrait of Laure Hayman

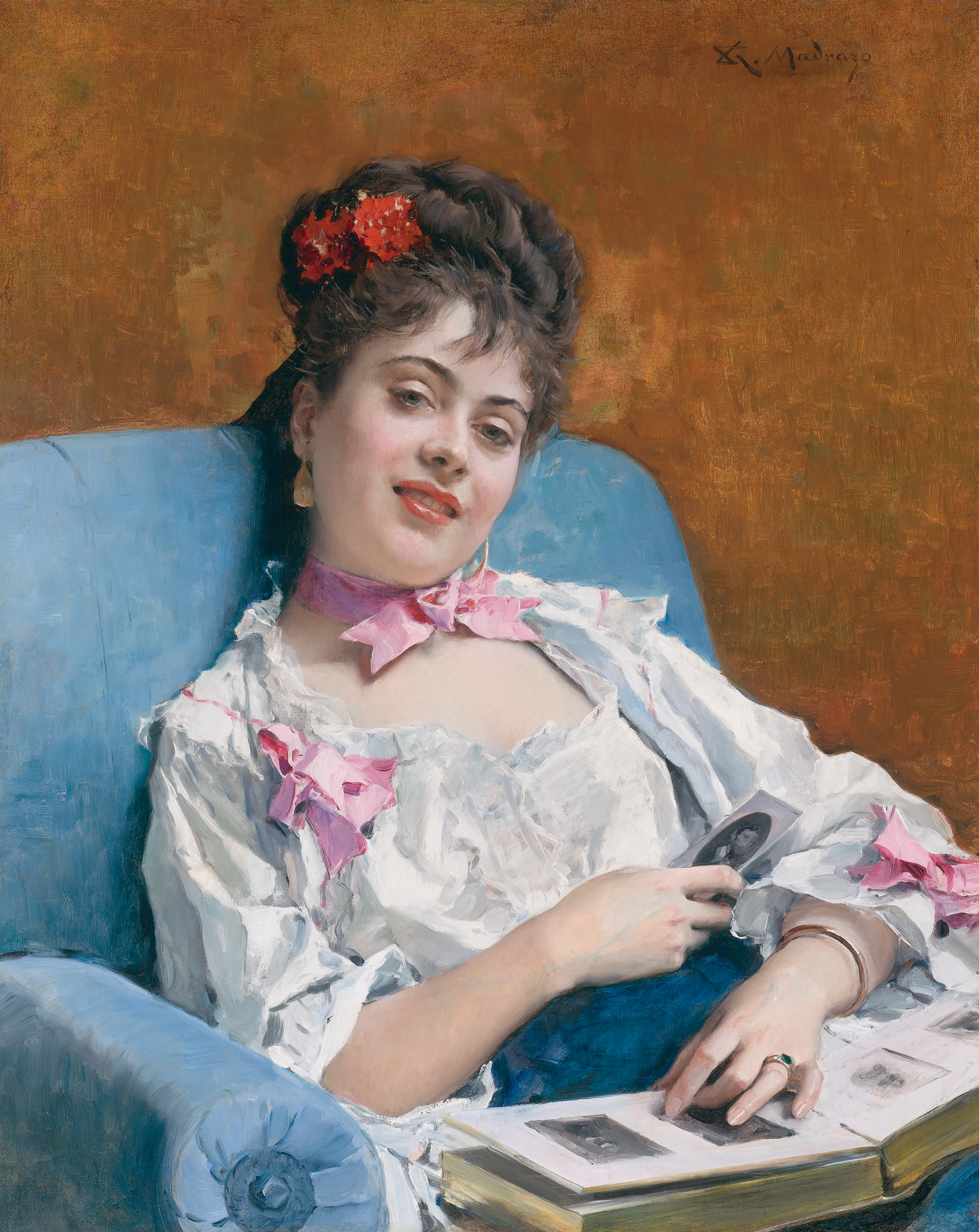
Fond Memories

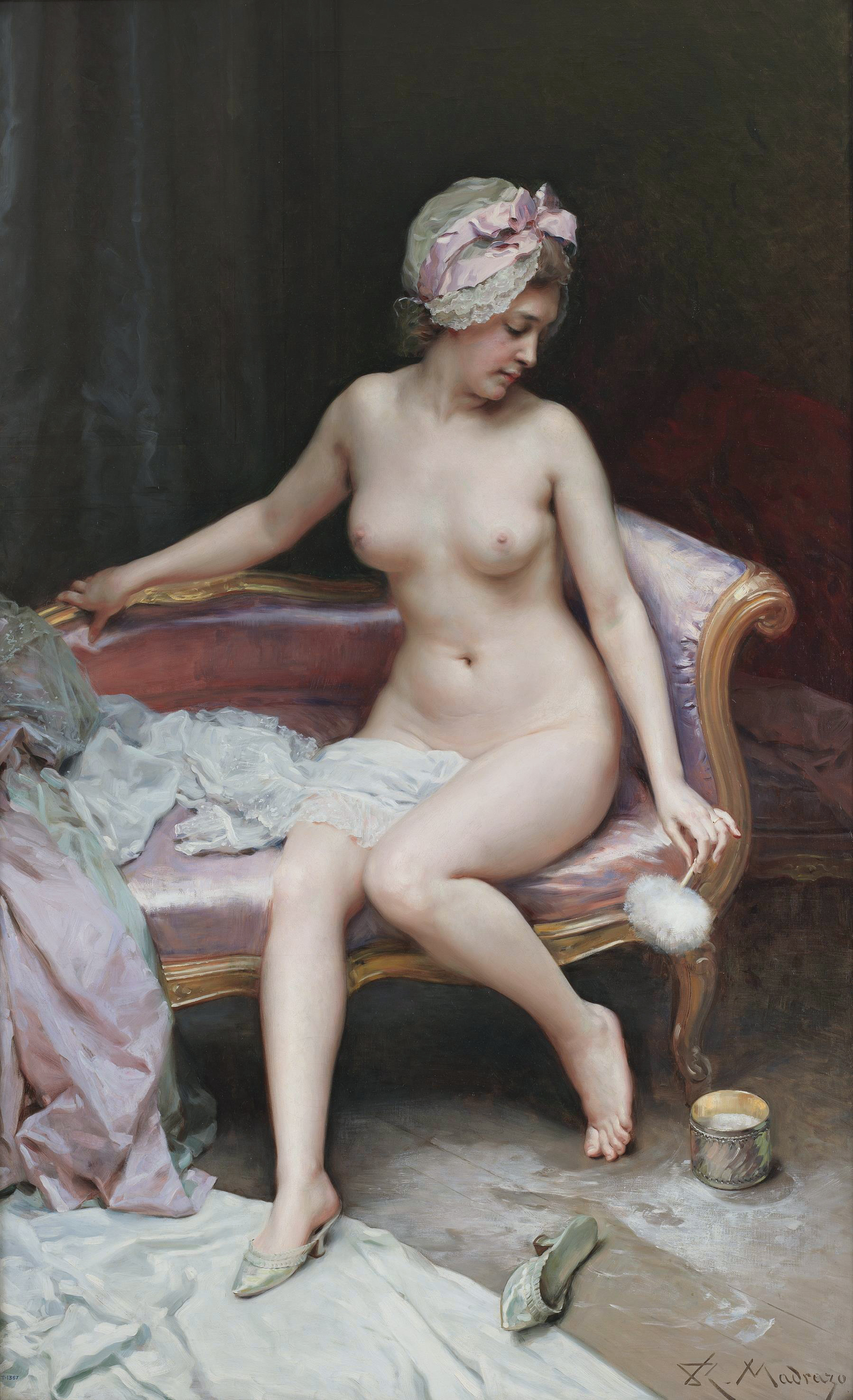
After the Bath, c. 1895

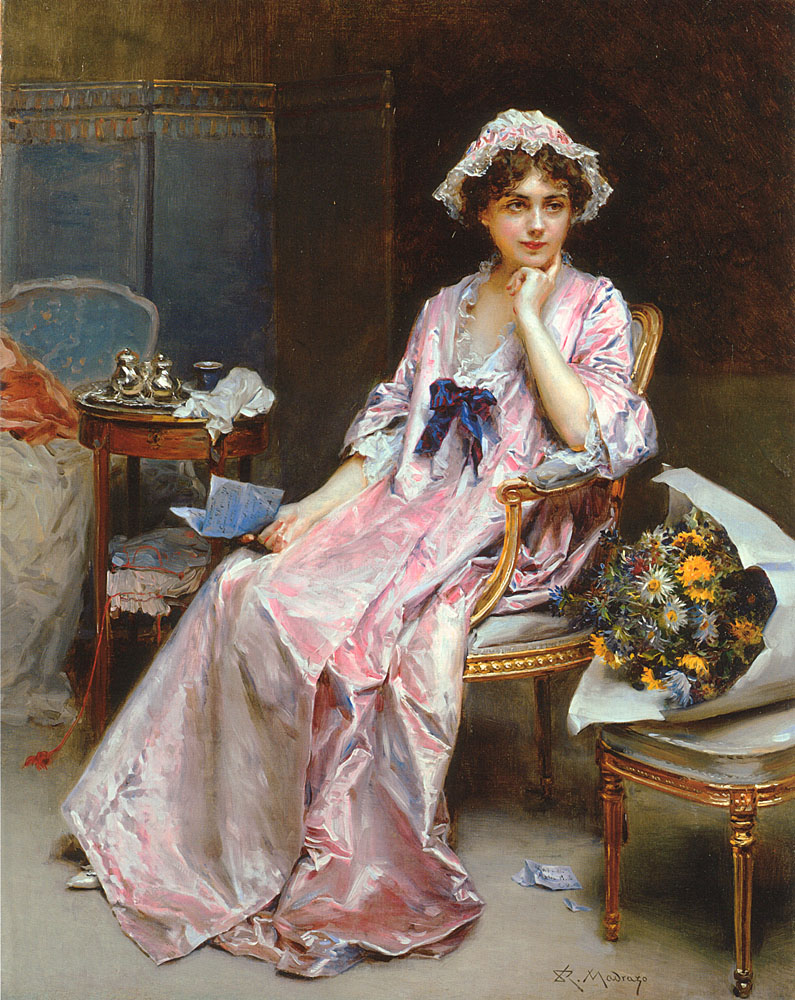
The Reluctant Mistress

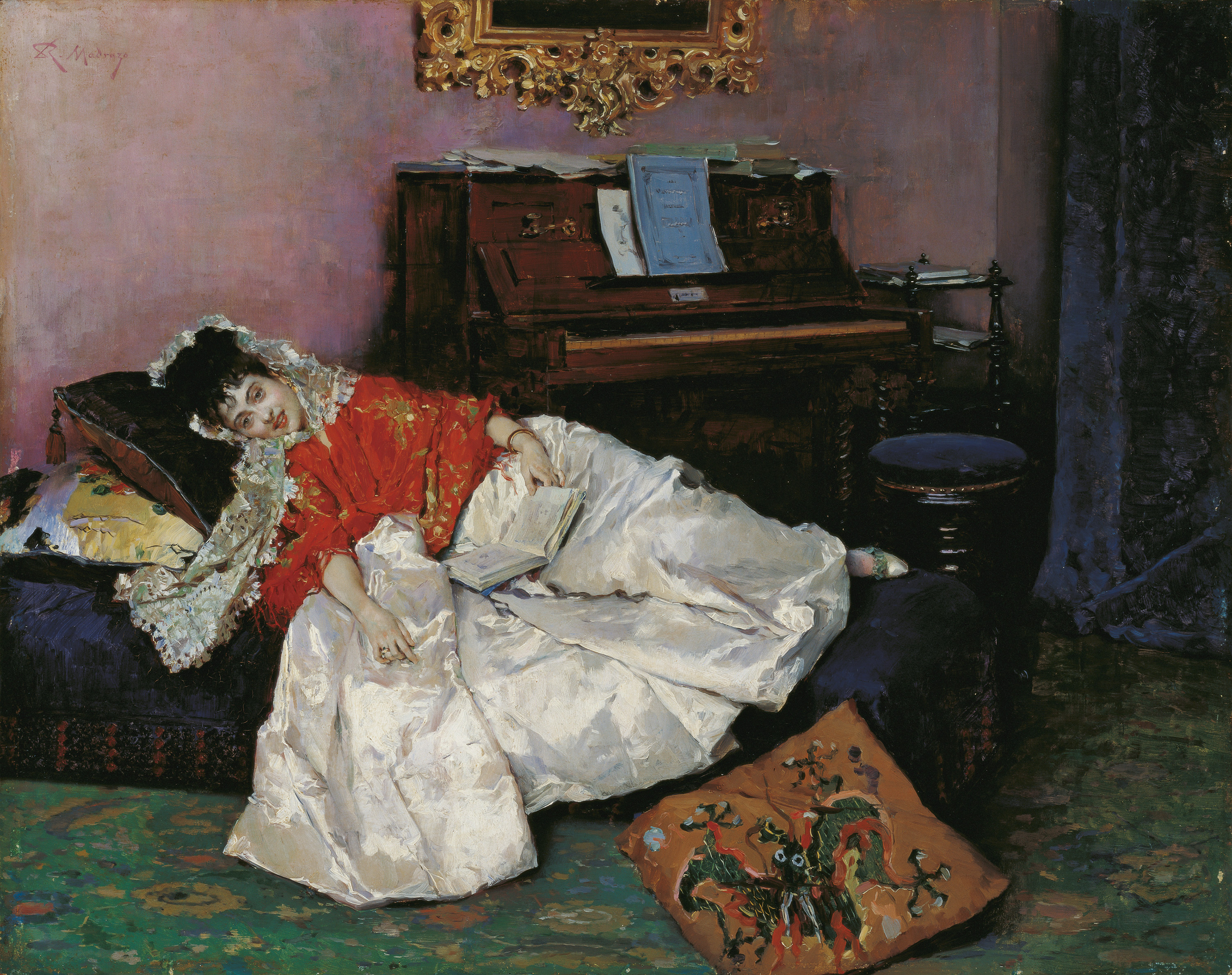
Reading, c. 1880-85

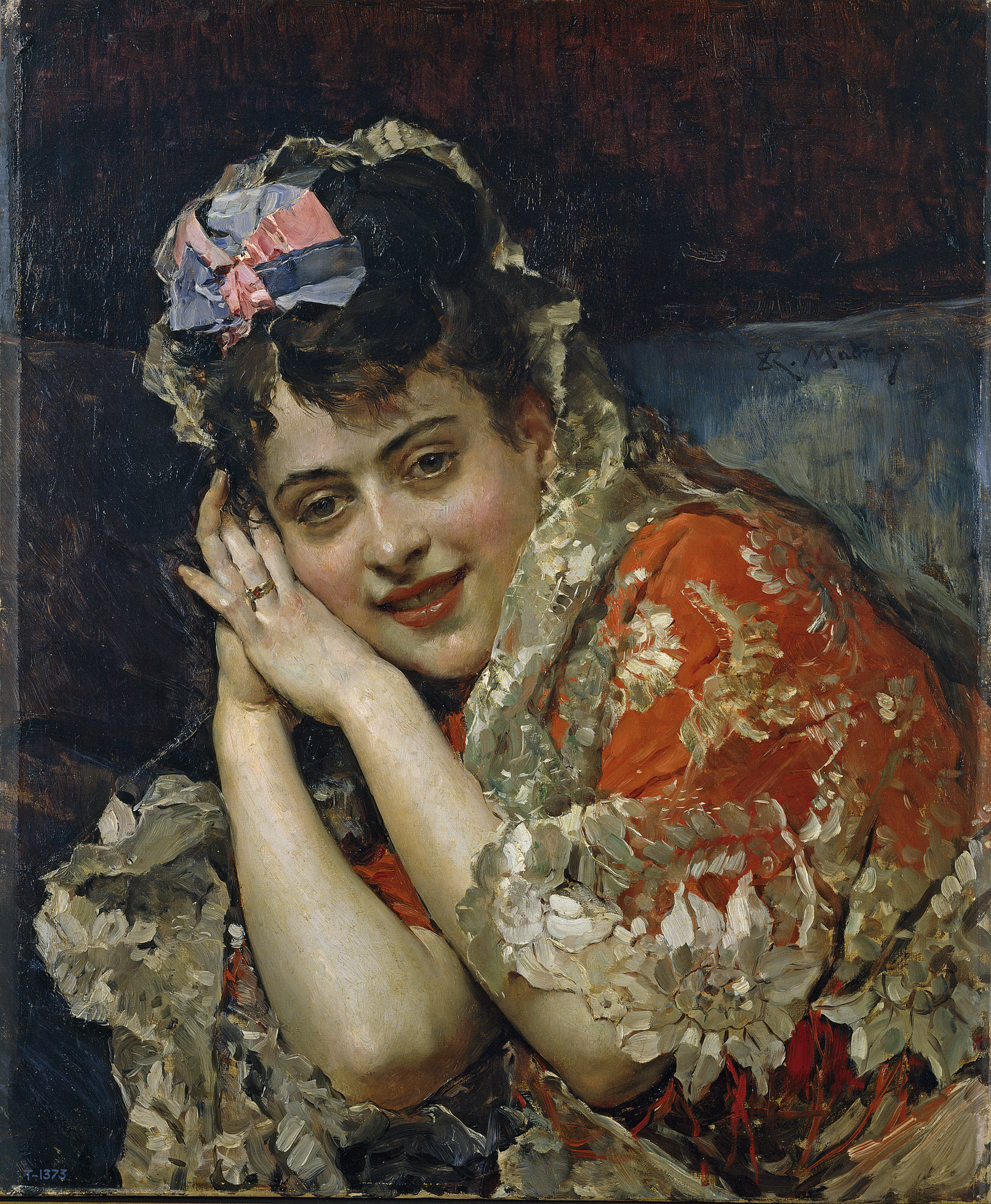
Portrait of Aline Masson in a Mantilla, c. 1875

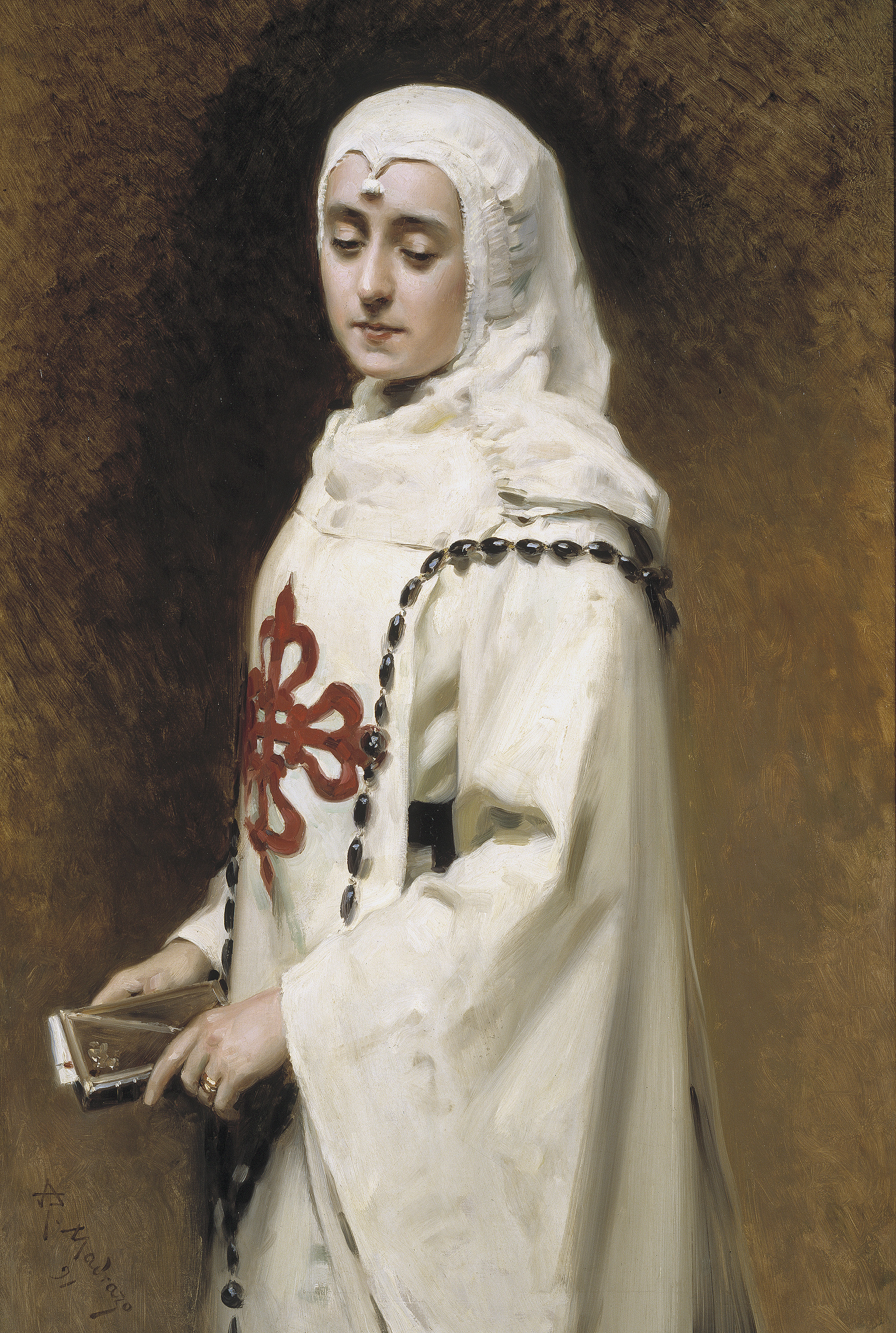
Portrait of María Guerrero as Doña Inés. 1891

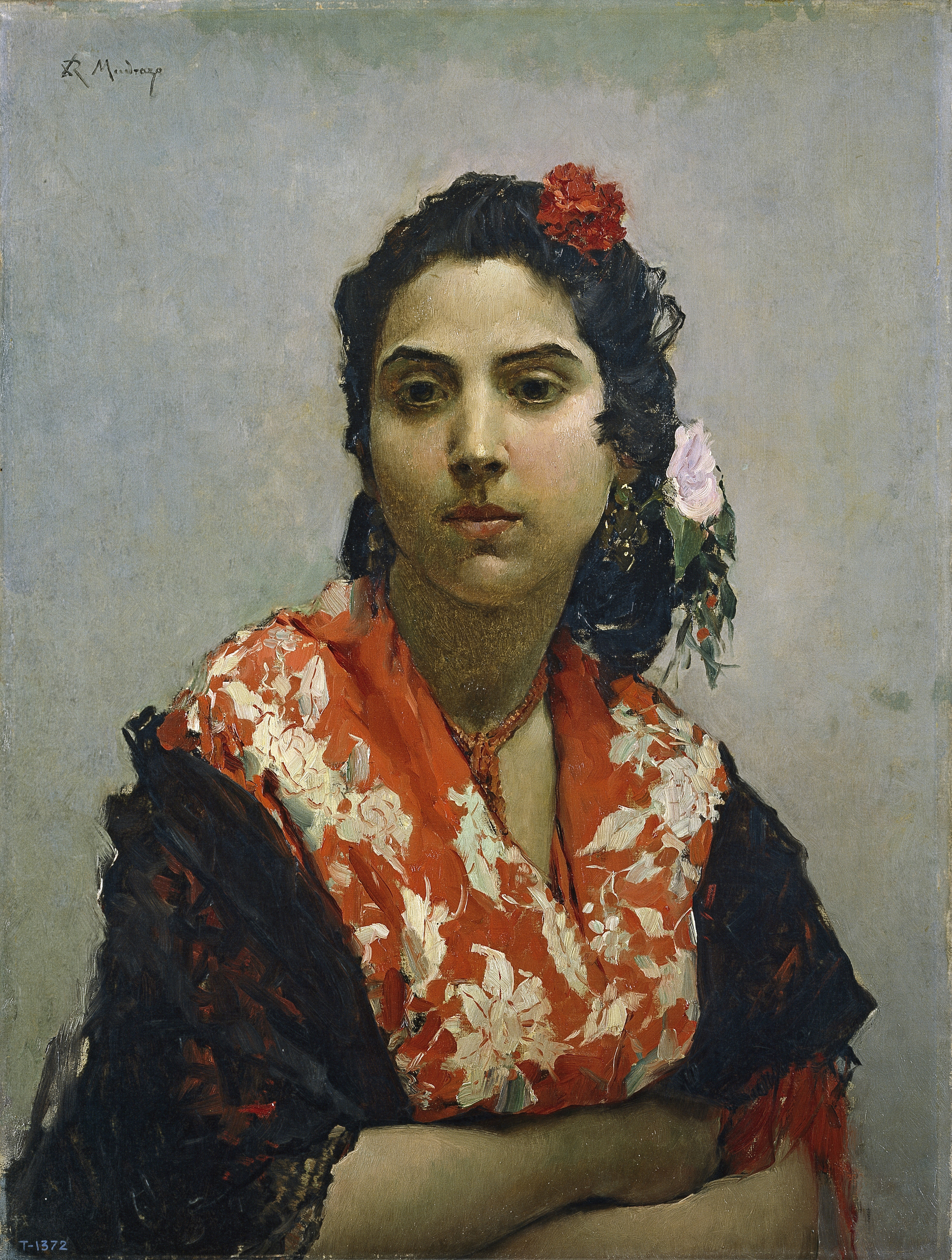
A gypsy, 1872

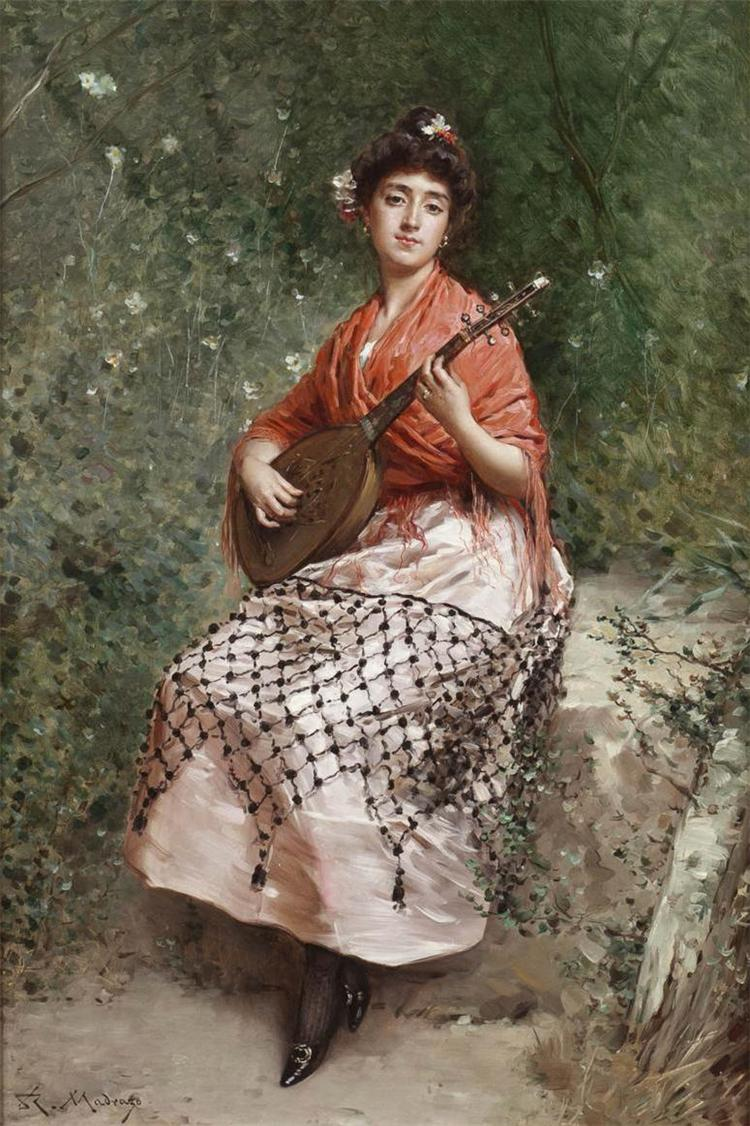
The Beautiful Bandurria Player, 1870

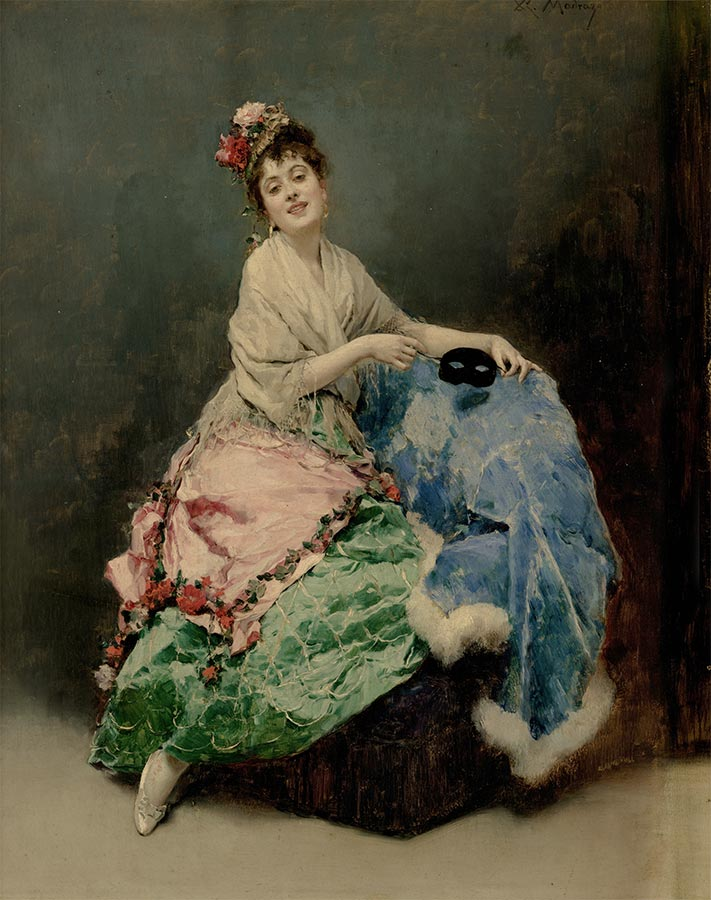
Aline with mask

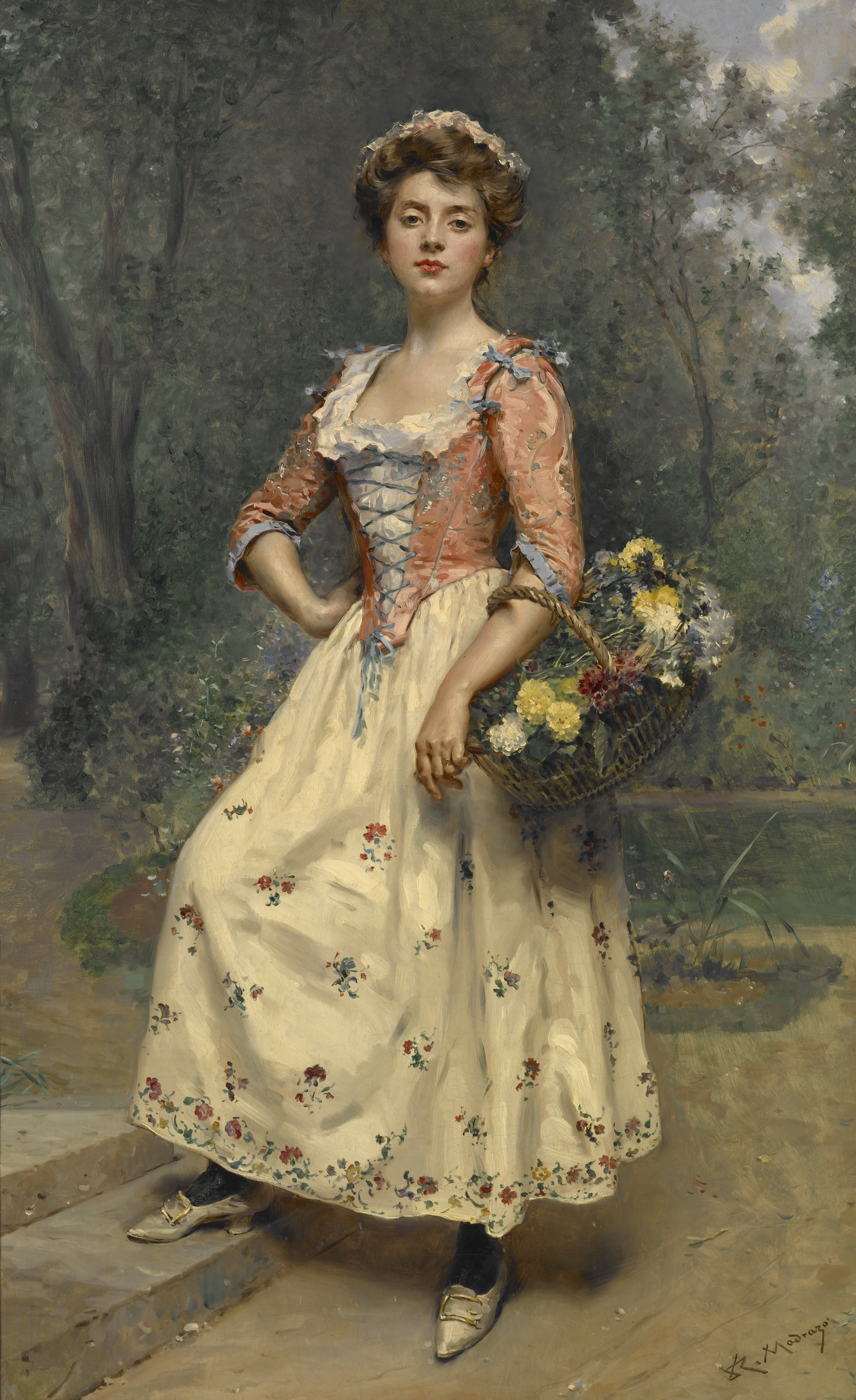
Spring Beauty

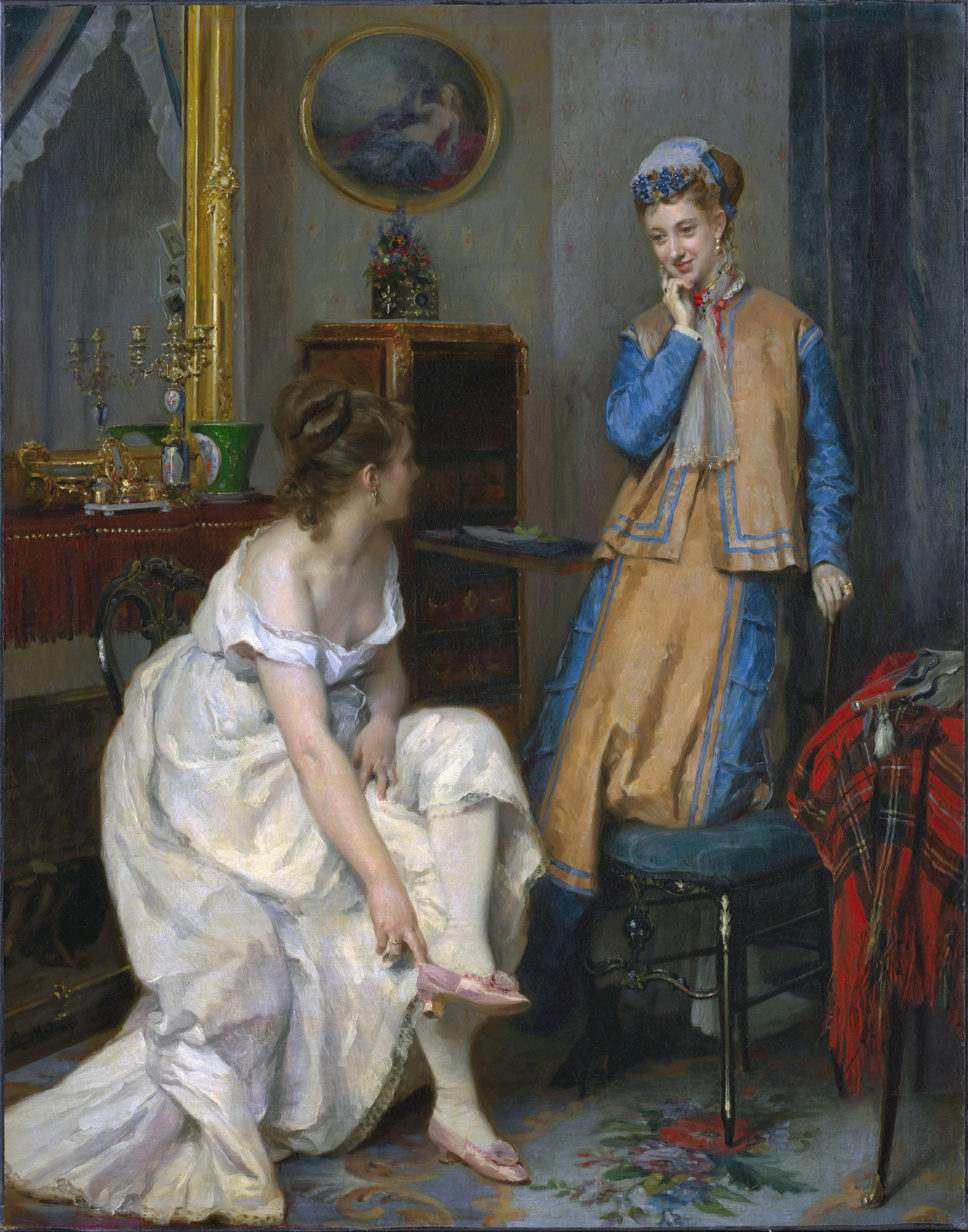
Confidences (The Morning Visit), c. 1870. Clark Art Institute

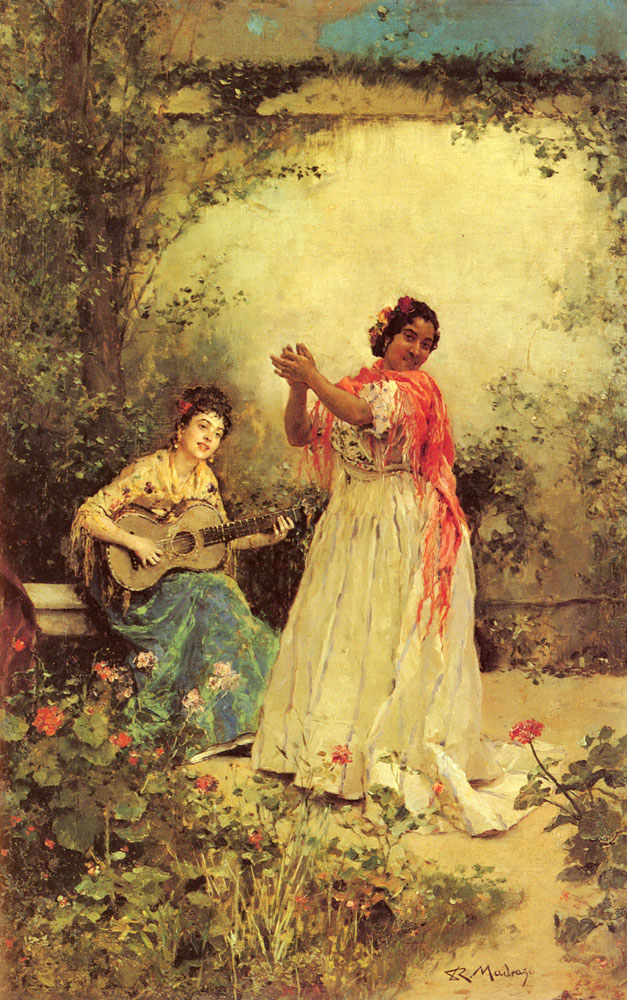
Beautiful and singing

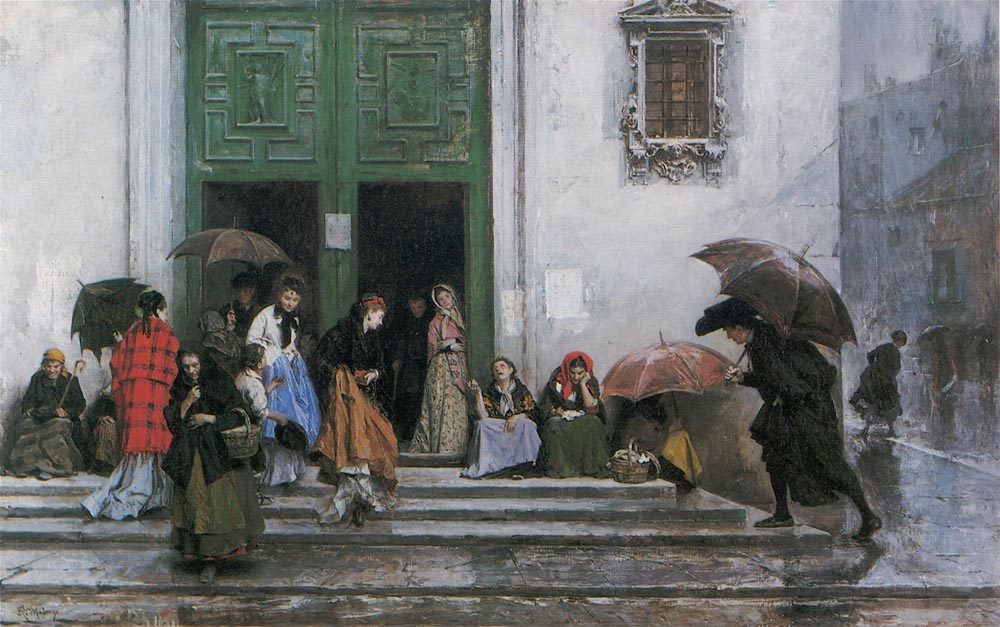
Coming Out of Church

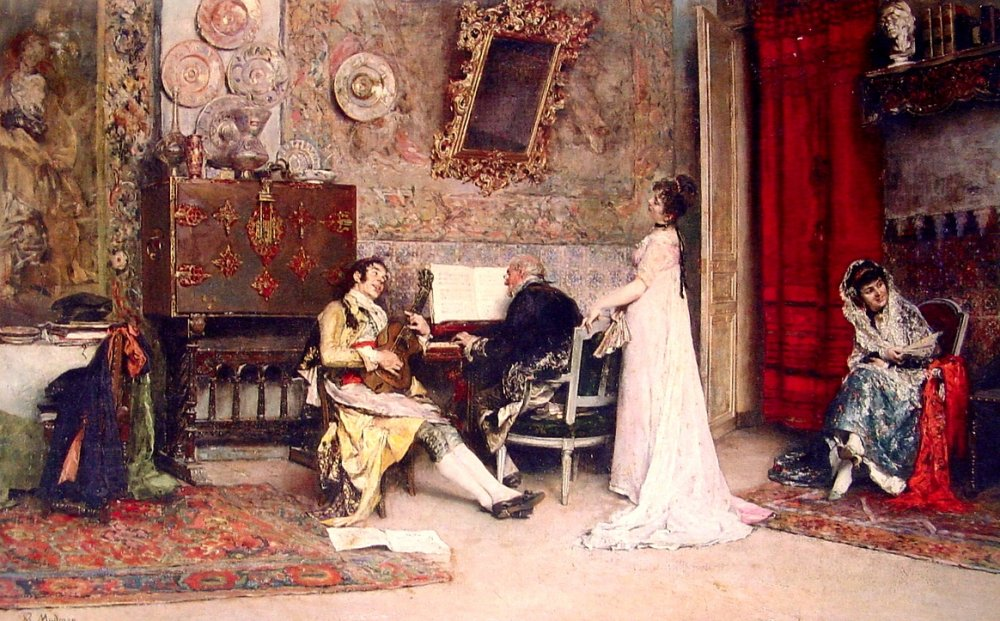
The Music Lesson

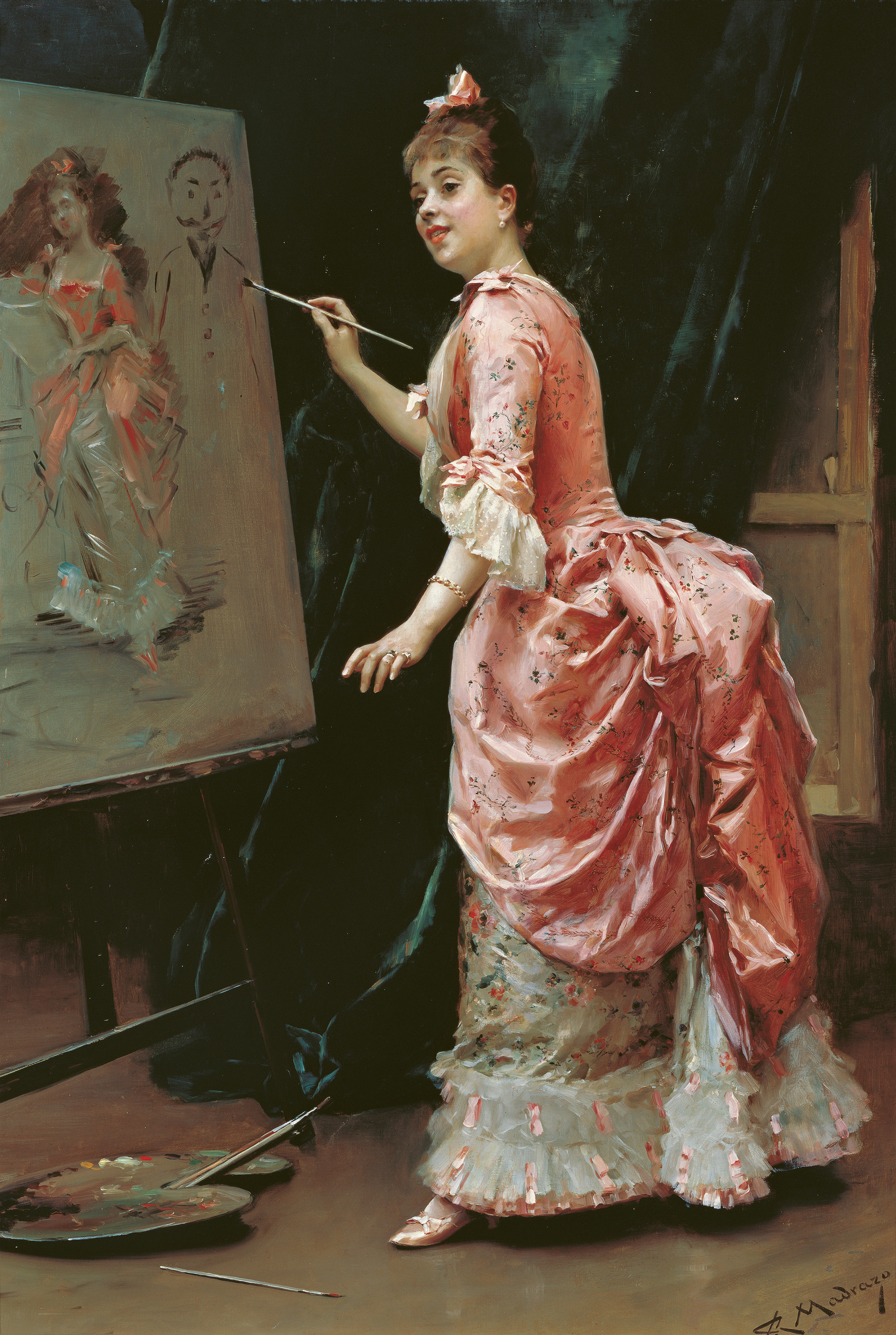
Antics of the model, c. 1885

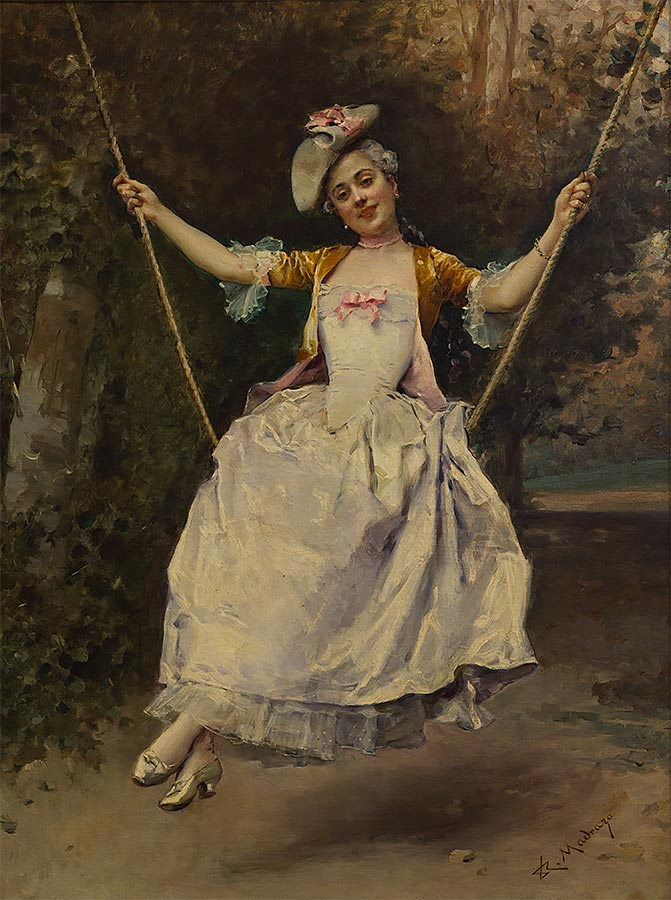
Girl on swing

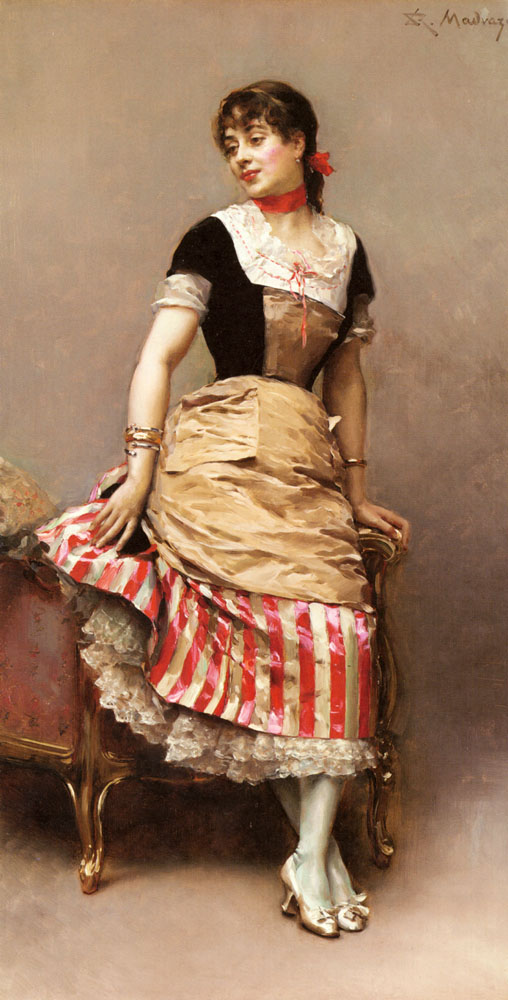
Portrait of Aline Masson Leaning on a Sofa

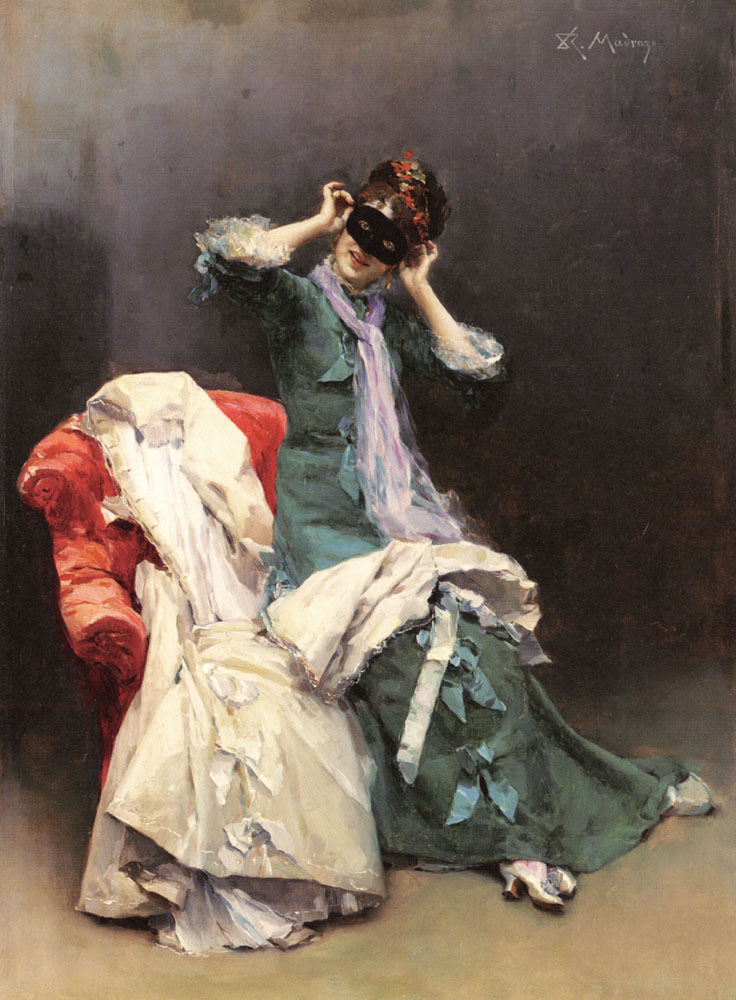
Preparing for the Costume Ball

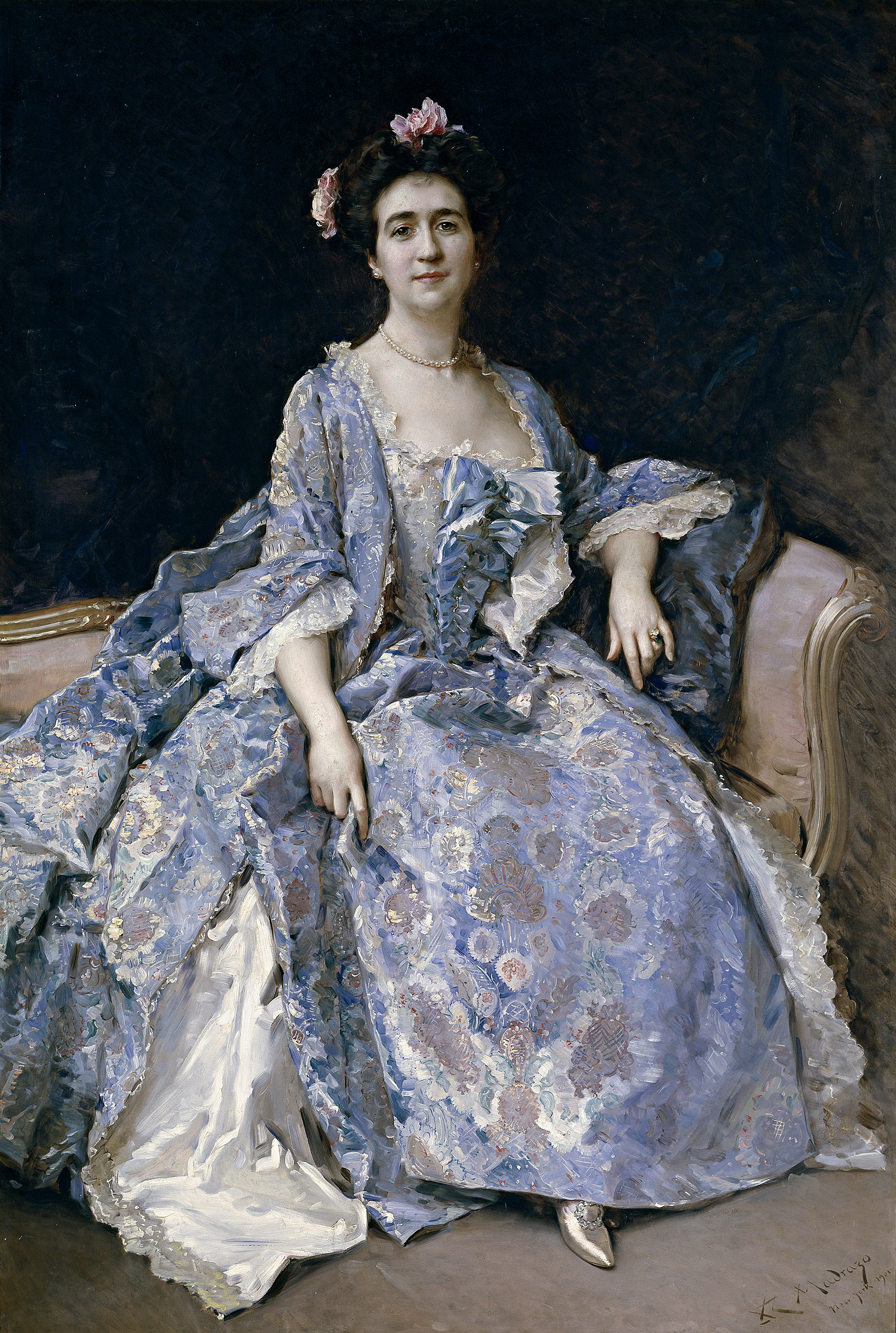
María Hahn, wife of the painter, 1901

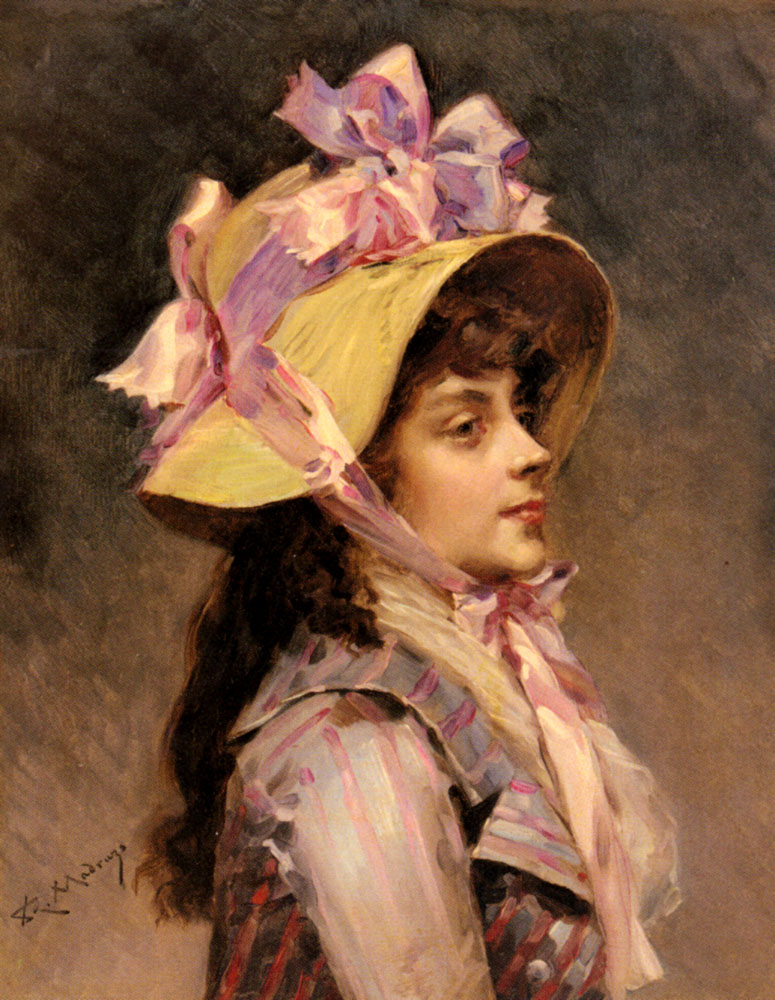
Portrait Of A Lady In Pink Ribbons

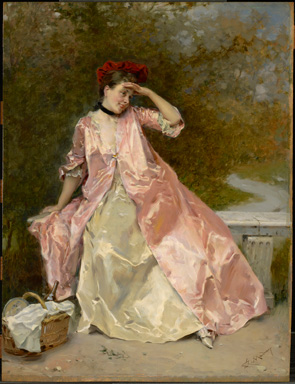
Woman with a Picnic Basket, c. 1890. Clark Art Institute

== See also ==
- List of Orientalist artists
- Orientalism
