= Casa Vicens =

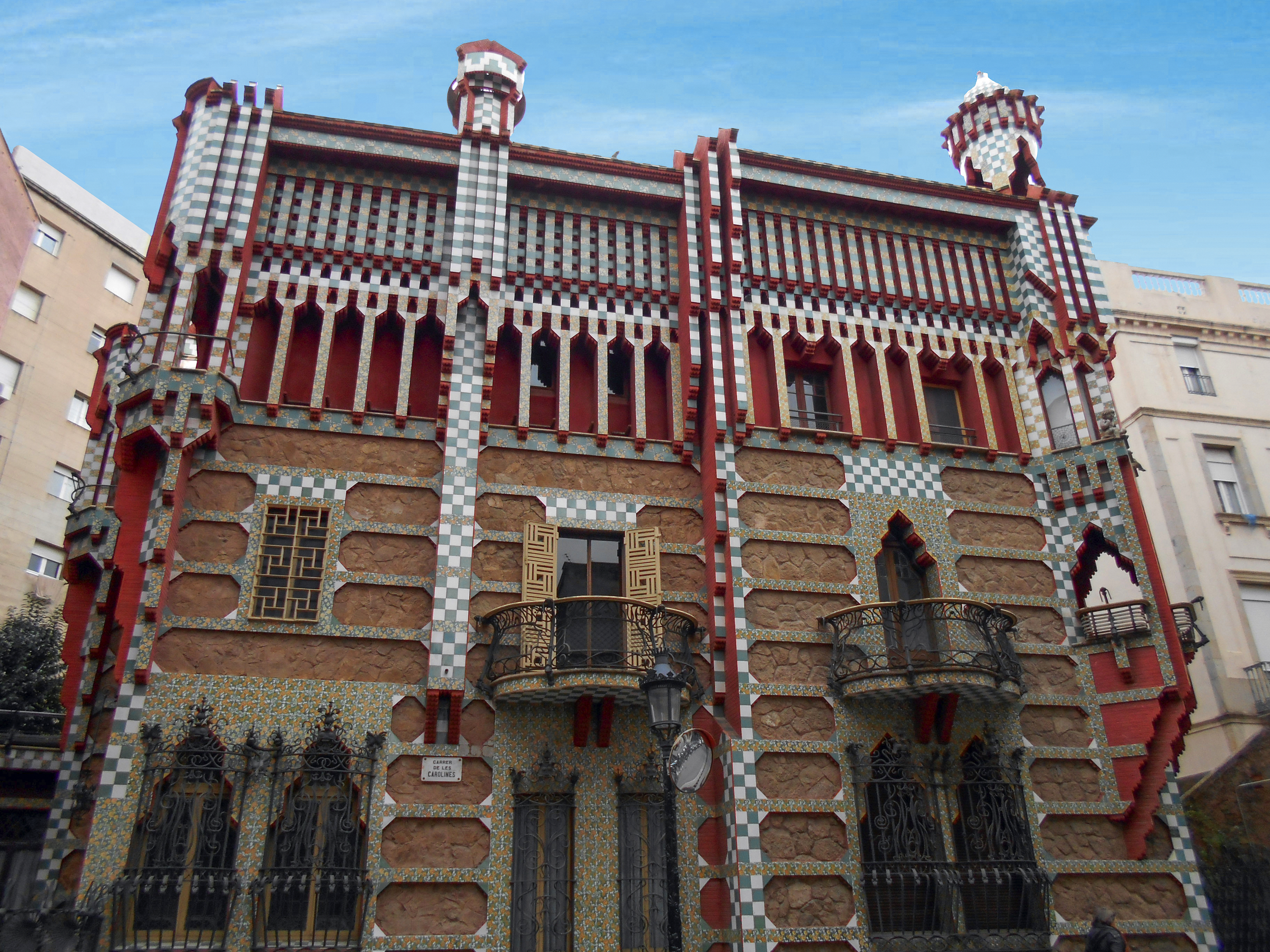
- Interactive map of the Casa Vicens area

General information
- Location: Barcelona, Catalonia, Spain
- Coordinates: 41°24′13″N 2°09′03″E

UNESCO World Heritage Site
- Part of: Works of Antoni Gaudí
- Criteria: Cultural: (i), (ii), (iv)
- Reference: 320-004
- Inscription: 1984 (8th Session)
- Extensions: 2005
- Area: 0.12 ha (13,000 sq ft)
- Buffer zone: 4.23 ha (455,000 sq ft)

Spanish Cultural Heritage
- Type: Non-movable
- Criteria: Monument
- Designated: 24 July 1969
- Reference no.: RI-51-0003823

Casa Vicens (Catalan pronunciation: [ˈkazə βiˈsɛns]) is a modernist building situated in the Gràcia neighbourhood of Barcelona. It is the work of architect Antoni Gaudí and is considered to be his first major project. It was built between 1883 and 1885, although Gaudí drew up the initial plans between 1878 and 1880. The work belongs to the orientalist style, similar to Neo-Mudéjar architecture, although interpreted in Gaudí’s own personal way, with a uniqueness that only he knew how to add to his projects. In this work, and for the first time, Gaudí outlined some of his constructive resources that would become regular features throughout the emergence of Modernisme. The work was widely discussed when it was built and caused a great sensation among the general public at the time. When the building was constructed, Gràcia was still an independent urban nucleus of Barcelona; it had its own council and was classified as a town, though nowadays it is a district of the city.

The original project had a large garden area, in addition to the house, but over time the land was subdivided and sold for the construction of residential buildings. Nowadays, the property has been reduced to the house and a small surrounding area. To take advantage of the space, Gaudí designed three facades, with the house attached by a dividing wall to an adjoining convent. In 1925 an extension of the house was planned, a commission that was offered to Gaudí, which he declined. Instead, he passed it to one of his protégés, Joan Baptista Serra, who built an extension following Gaudí’s original style, with the inclusion of a new facade, resulting in the building being fully detached.

The work belongs to Gaudí’s orientalist period (1883-1888), an era in which the architect made a series of works with a distinctly oriental flavour, inspired by the art of the Near and Far East (India, Persia, Japan), as well as Hispanic Islamic art, such as Mudéjar and Nasrid. During this period, Gaudí used an abundance of ceramic tiling to decorate his work, as well as Moorish arches, columns of exposed brick and temple-shaped or dome-shaped finishes.

The building was declared a Historic-Artistic Monument in 1969, with registration number 52-MH-EN; an Asset of Cultural Interest in 1993, with reference number RI-51-0003823; and a World Heritage Site in 2005, with reference number 320bis.

== History ==
=== Gaudí’s first significant work ===
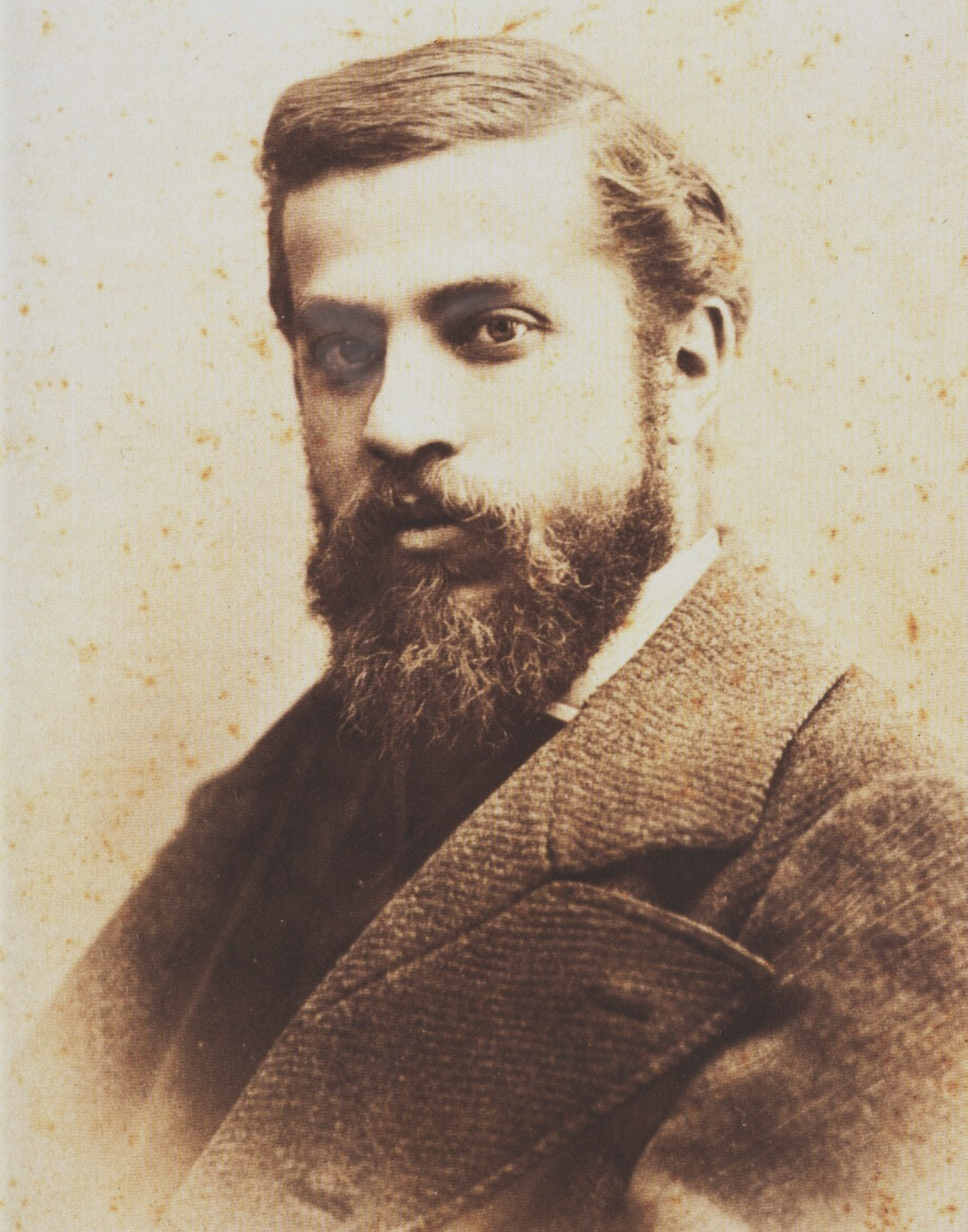
Antoni Gaudí

Antoni Gaudí (Reus or Riudoms, 1852 - Barcelona, 1926) studied architecture at the Llotja School and the Barcelona School of Architecture, where he graduated in 1878. To finance his studies, Gaudí worked as a draughtsman for various architects and builders, such as Leandre Serrallach, Joan Martorell, Emilio Sala Cortés, Francisco de Paula del Villar y Lozano and Josep Fontserè. After obtaining his architecture degree in 1878, his first projects were lampposts for the Plaça Reial, the Girossi Newsstand project, the display case for the Esteban Comella glove shop, and the furniture for the chapel-pantheon of the Sobrellano Palace in Comillas, all completed in the same year as his graduation. The Cooperativa Obrera Mataronense (Mataró Workers’ Cooperative) (1878-1882), was his first important commission, although it was not completed in its entirety, since only one warehouse was built. His subsequent work included furniture for the Gibert Pharmacy (1879), the decoration of the church of Sant Pacià in Sant Andreu de Palomar (1879-1881) and the church of the Col·legi de Jesús-Maria in Tarragona (1880-1882).

Gaudí combined the construction of Casa Vicens with other commissions: in 1883 he took over the work of the Temple Expiatori of the Sagrada Família, started the previous year in a project by Francisco de Paula del Villar y Lozano, which he withdrew from shortly after due to a disagreement with the construction board. Gaudí would then devote the rest of his life to the construction of the temple, regarded as his greatest work and the synthesis of all his architectural findings. In the same year, 1883, he worked on an altarpiece for the chapel of the Santíssim Sagrament in the parish church of San Feliu in Alella, as well as topographical plans for the Can Rosell de la Llena farmhouse in Gelida. He was also commissioned to build an annexed villa for the Sobrellano Palace, owned by Antonio López y López, Marquis of Comillas, in the Cantabrian town of the same name, known as El Capricho. It was built between 1883 and 1885 in an orientalist style similar to that of Casa Vicens, where its ceramic cladding is clearly visible. He also built the Güell Pavilions in Pedralbes (1884-1887) in a similar style, a commission from Eusebi Güell, his principal patron and friend.

This moment represented the first stage of Gaudí’s career. The period is characterised by his use of an architectural language with great constructive simplicity, in which the straight line prevails over the curved line. Stylistically, it belongs to a stage of orientalist influence, where the structural and ornamental forms correspond to a preference for oriental art. These principally include Mudéjar, Persian and Byzantine, and can be seen in other works of his, such as the Pavellons Güell, the Bodegas Güell and El Capricho in Comillas. Gaudí had studied Neo-Mudéjar art in the works of Owen Jones, such as Plans, Elevations, Sections and Details of the Alhambra (1842), Designs for Mosaics and Tessellated Pavements (1842) and Grammar of Ornament (1856).

The concept Gaudí had of the family home – which was reflected in Casa Vicens – is captured in an unpublished article he wrote in 1881, entitled The Manor House (Catalan: La casa pairal). He writes, ‘The house is the small family nation. The family, like the nation, has history, foreign relations, changes of government, and so on. The independent family has its own house, that which is not, has a rented house. The owned house is the native country, the rental house is the land of emigration; this is why the owned house is the ideal for all. One cannot conceive of the owned house without a family, only the rented house is conceived in this way’.

=== The commission ===
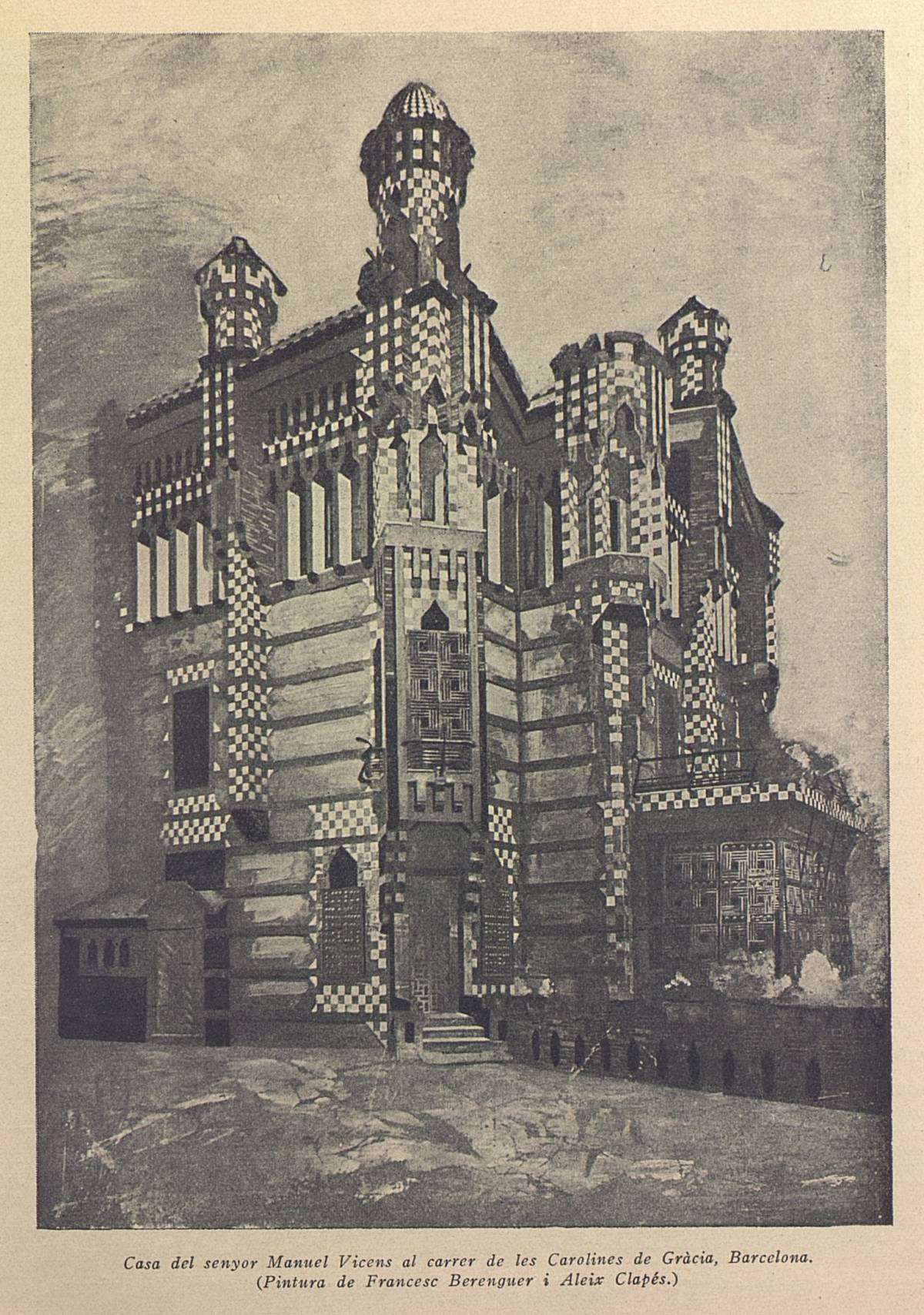
Casa Vicens Drawing (1910), by Francesc Berenguer and Aleix Clapés

In 1878 Gaudí received a commission from Manuel Vicens i Montaner to build a summer residence for the family in the town of Gràcia. Manuel Vicens (1836–1895) was a stock and currency broker, although there is little information about him. From his will, it is known that he had a house in Alella, as well as two properties in the centre of Barcelona and some land in the Vallvidrera area. The land where the house was built had been inherited by Manuel Vicens from his mother, Rosa Montaner i Matas, in 1877. He died on April 29, 1895, leaving his properties to his widow, Dolors Giralt i Grífol. (Note: Numerous bibliographies erroneously state that Vicens was a tile manufacturer. From the documentation containing his personal details however, it was discovered that he was a stockbroker.)

The way in which Vicens met Gaudí is unknown, although it is likely that they coincided in the cultural circles linked to the Renaixença that they both frequented. Subsequently, Vicens and Gaudí became friends, and between 1880 and 1890 the architect often spent his summers at Vicens’ house in Alella. For this house, Gaudí designed two pieces of furniture: a wood and metal corner fireplace with the initials M.V. (by Manuel Vicens), currently kept in the Casa Vicens; and a cedar wood corner cabinet with gilt brass and the initials D.G. (by Dolors Giralt), purchased by Casa Vicens at auction in 2023 in order to be exhibited after restoration. As a result of Gaudí’s time there, he began a project to design an altarpiece in 1883 for the church of San Feliu in Alella, commissioned by the parish priest Jaume Puig Claret, but the project was never completed. A drawing in India ink on fabric paper is preserved, at a scale of 1:25.

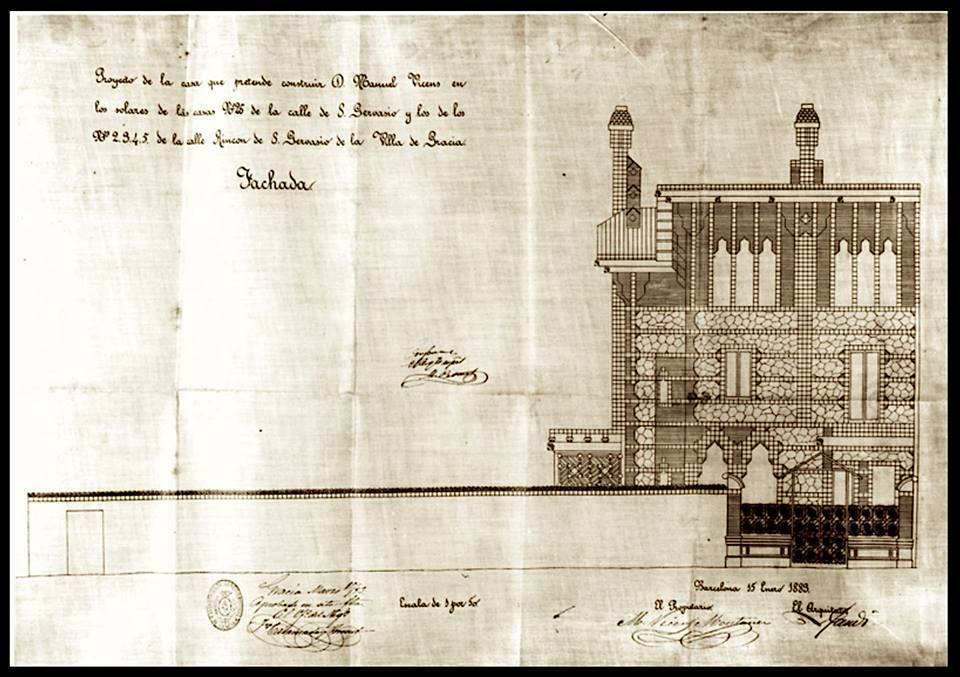
Facade of the Casa Vicens, signed by Gaudí on January 15, 1883

At the time, the town of Gràcia was its own entity and independent from Barcelona. Its population centre was built around the Carmelite convent of Santa Maria de Gràcia – popularly known as els Josepets – which was founded in 1630. It was an agricultural area, populated with farmhouses, which at the beginning of the 19th century began to urbanise and an incipient industrial framework emerged. The town was added to Barcelona in 1897 along with five other neighbouring towns: Sants, Les Corts, Sant Gervasi de Cassoles, Sant Andreu de Palomar and Sant Martí de Provençals. At that time, many bourgeoisie families had their second homes in Gràcia, since it was close to the city yet had the tranquillity of a town. The house is located on a street named Carrer de les Carolines, in honour of the Caroline Islands – an old Spanish colony – in 1908; it was previously called Sant Gervasi.

The original plot was situated between the convent of the Daughters of Charity of Saint Vincent de Paul, who shared a dividing wall with one side of the building (the northeast side), and a narrow street with a dead end, called Carreró Racó de Sant Gervasi, which later disappeared. This land came from three different sites acquired between 1846 and 1854 by Agustí Maria Baró i Tastàs, which included several ground floor buildings. In 1866 it was inherited by the mother of Manuel Vicens, Rosa Montaner i Matas, widow of Onofre Vicens i Domènech. She died in 1877 and it passed to Manuel Vicens. (Note: Agustí Baró, currency broker, died without issue. Manuel Vicens worked as a clerk for him, and in his first marriage he married Baró’s niece, Manuela Baró i Cunill, although he was soon widowed. In turn, Rosa, a sister of Manuel, married Joan Baró i Cunill, brother of Manuela. For this reason, Baró bequeathed his fortune to the mother of both, establishing a clause that she could only be testate in favour of her children.) It is unknown whether the buildings on the site were demolished or used in part in Gaudí’s project. In 1876 and 1881, Vicens bought two plots adjacent to Carreró Racó de Sant Gervasi, which allowed the property’s garden to be extended.

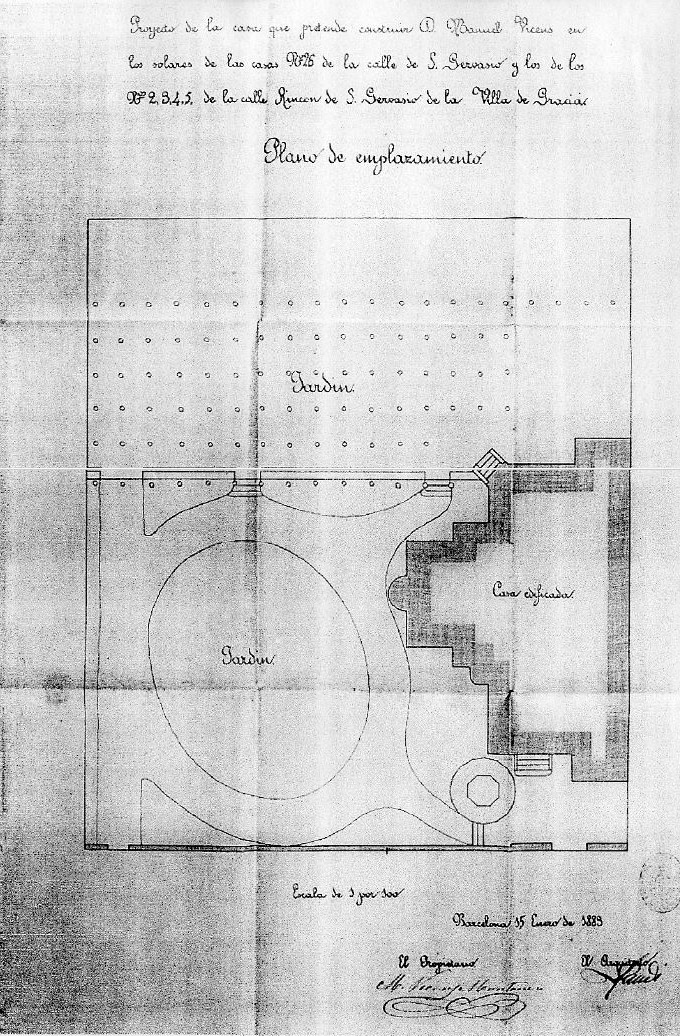
Site plan

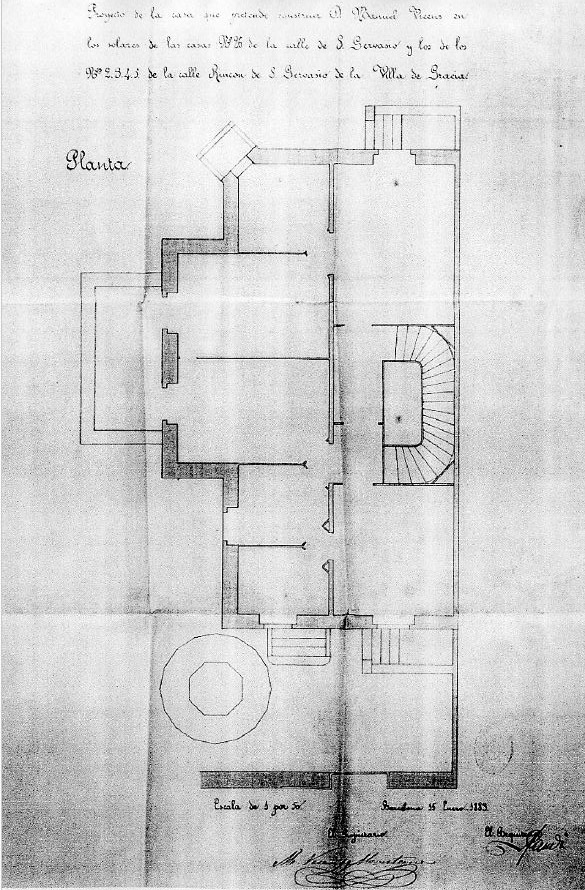
Ground floor plan

Gaudí completed the project for the house and garden in 1880, although the plans were not signed until 1883, when they were presented to the Gràcia Town Council. (Note: Signed by Gaudí on January 15, 1883, the plans were presented on January 20 and were approved by the municipal architect of Gràcia, Miquel Pascual Tintorer, on 26 February 1883. Finally, on March 1, they were approved by the plenary of the Gràcia Town Council. Gaudí presented four plans: one of the site, at a scale of 1:100; one of the ground floor, 1:50 scale; a section of the facade which looked onto the street, scale 1:50; and a plan of the southeast facade, at a scale of 1:50. Later, on September 1, the plan for the waterfall was presented, which was approved on the 8th of that month. He presented the floor, elevation and section, at a scale of 1:50.) Its design combined a relatively simple architectural structure with the complexity of its meticulous decoration, especially in terms of the use of ceramic tiles. Stylistically, it belongs entirely to his orientalist phase, but the abundance of decorative artwork (ceramics, ironwork, glasswork, and woodwork) shows signs of what would be Gaudí’s golden age within Catalan Modernism. The work was carried out between 1883 and 1885. (Note: Some sources indicate 1888 as the year of completion, but there are no documents to corroborate this. However, one of Gaudí’s first biographers, Josep Francesc Ràfols, who was a protégé of his and knew the architect well, states in his work Antoni Gaudí (1928) that the building took two years to build.) Gaudí personally managed the construction: according to the testimony of Joan Baptista Serra to George R. Collins in 1959, the architect sat under a parasol and supervised the build, occasionally knocking down what he considered to be poor workmanship.

Throughout the project, Gaudí called on the help of various craftsmen who would regularly assist him in his work, such as the sculptor Llorenç Matamala, the carpenter Eudald Puntí and the blacksmith Joan Oñós, as well as Claudi Alsina, a contractor. The decoration was carried out by the painter Francesc Torrescassana and the sculptor Antoni Riba.

The original site measured 30 × 34.5 m, with a surface area of 1035 m^{2}. (Note: Other sources indicate an area of 983 m^{2}.) The house had three facades, since on its northeast side there was a dividing wall shared with a neighbouring convent. Although the entrance was on the southeast side, facing Carrer Sant Gervasi, the main facade looked out onto the garden, on the southwest side, bordering the small street of Carreró Racó de Sant Gervasi, which was 35 × 3.5 m wide. The house, designed as a single-family home, had a wine cellar and basement for storage; a main floor with a foyer, dining room, porch, smoking room, kitchen and laundry room; a first floor with bedrooms, bathrooms, a dressing room and a library; an attic for staff accommodation; and a roof terrace with small walkways between the gables with chimneys and a pavilion in the northwest corner. It had a Catalan vaulted staircase with wooden wainscoting on each step, decorated with small oil paintings by Torrescassana, which were lost in the renovations of 1925.

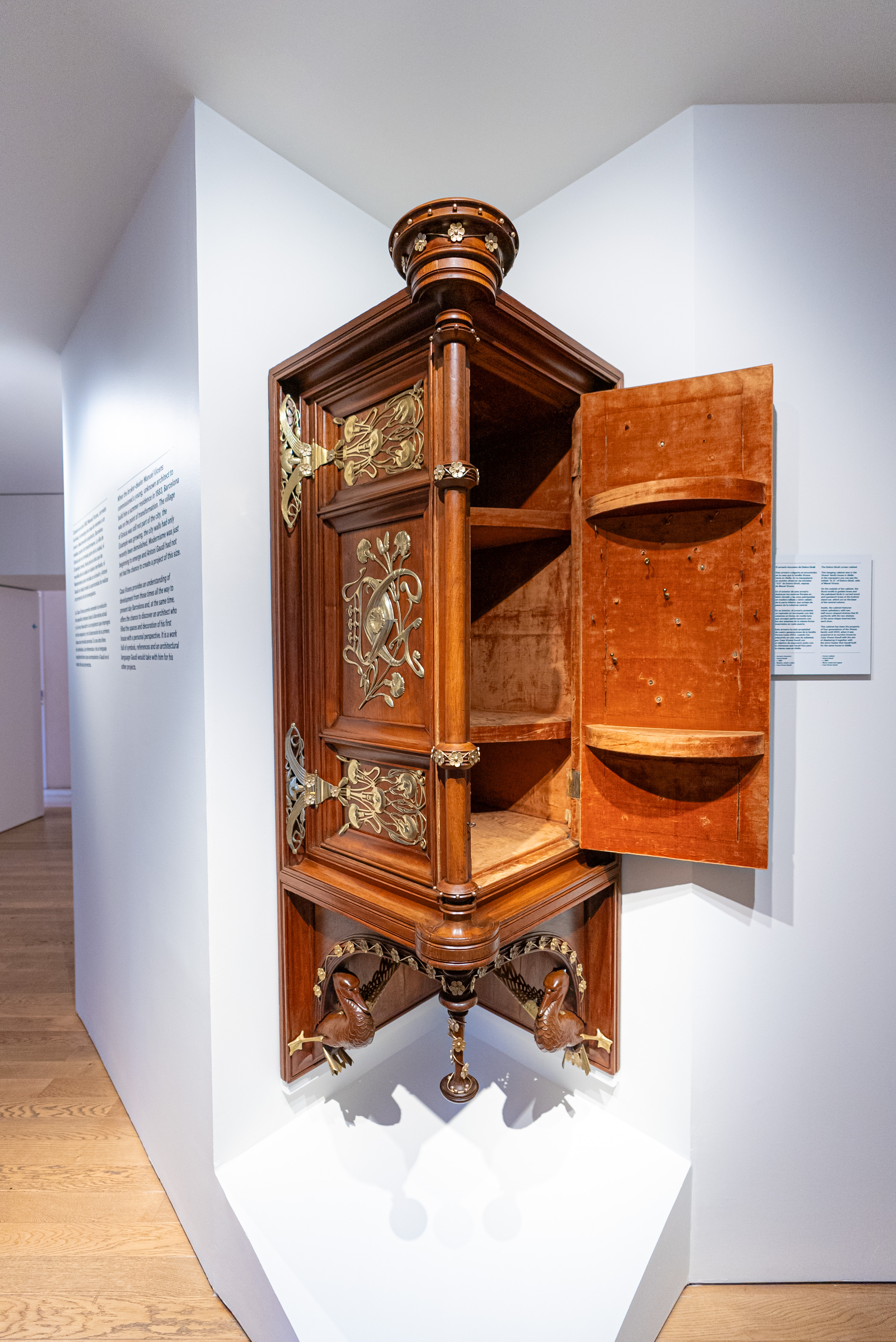
Cedar wood corner cabinet designed by Gaudí for the family Vicens

The architect planned a set of masonry walls for the house, alternated with rows of tiles. The tiles would feature yellow flowers typical of the area (Indian carnations or Tagetes erecta), which Gaudí had found on the site of the house before construction, and which he wanted to reproduce in the final project. He was also inspired by a palmetto tree he discovered on site, to design the cast iron gate at the main entrance in the shape of palm leaves (Chamaerops humilis). As Gaudí expressed, “When I went to take the measurements of the site, it was totally covered with some yellow flowers, which I used as an ornamental theme for the ceramic. I also found an exuberant palmetto palm, whose leaves fill the grid of the gate of the house”.

In his design of the house, Gaudí sought to combine practicality and aesthetics with comfort, hygiene and well-being, as well as a perfect harmony between the garden and its surroundings. As in all his projects, he designed the house down to the smallest detail and took care of aspects such as lighting and ventilation, trying to establish optimal conditions for the habitability of the house. One of the most evocative spaces on the property was the covered porch located next to the dining room, connected to the garden by oriental-inspired wooden latticework that, when opened, would transform the space into an outdoor area. It featured a water fountain made from a Renaissance-style basin and an elliptical metal grill, similar to a spider’s web. The fountain allowed the water to flow as a thin sheet which reflected the colours of the rainbow when light passed through it.

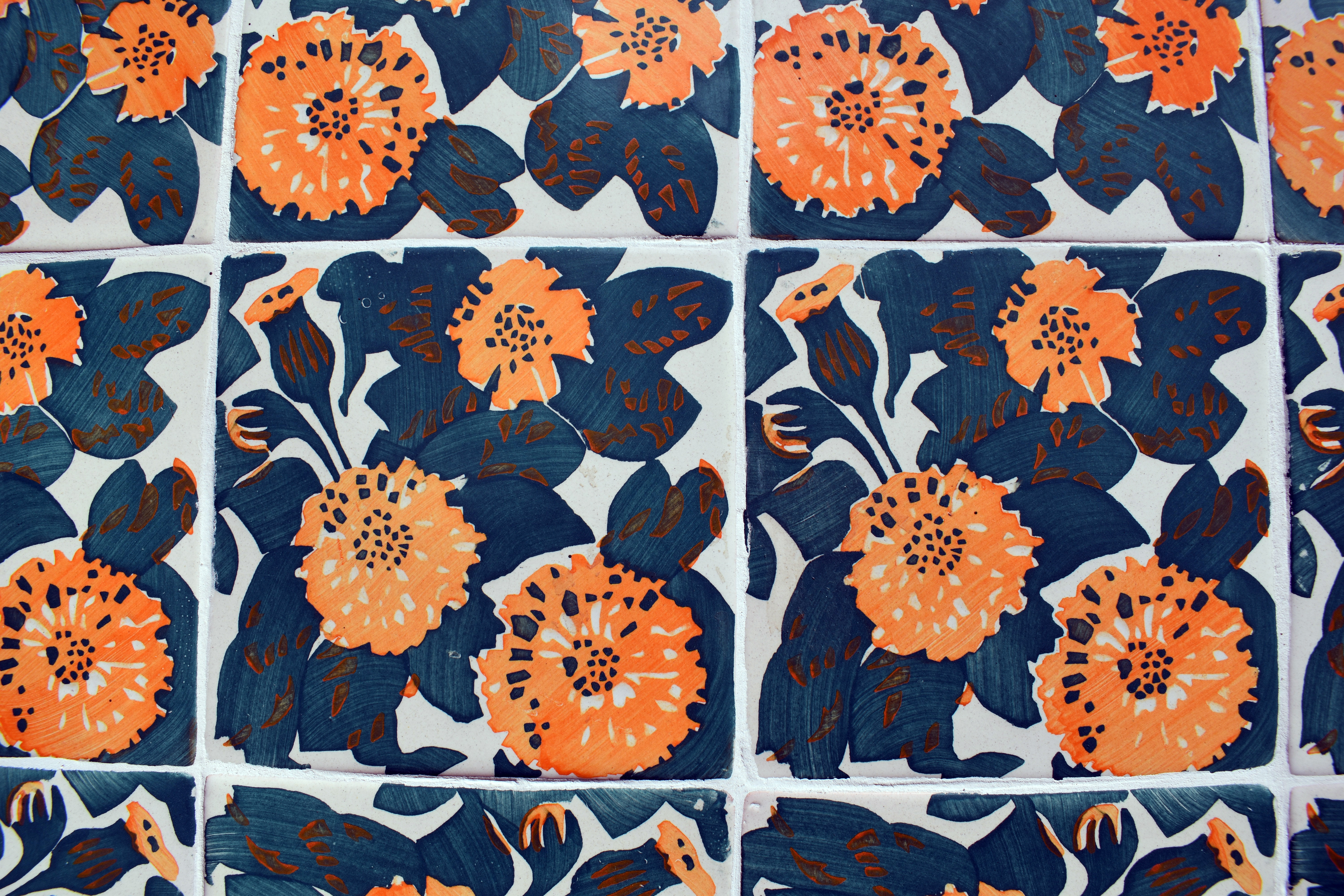
Tiles with carnation motifs. Gaudí claimed to have found these flowers on the site to be built and wanted to pay tribute to them

The former garden was made up of three areas: one that separated the house from the street; one situated in front of the grand entrance, with circular flowerbeds of palms; and another at the side which featured fruit trees. Gaudí put considerable thought into the design of the garden; as it was a summer residence, the garden provided an important space for recreation. Along with the natural elements, two further elements stood out: a brick and ceramic fountain at the entrance and a monumental waterfall, also made of brick. The waterfall was the same height as the house and was formed by a large catenary arch that supported a structure of false brick arches that formed two loggias with alternating pillars, with two side staircases. At the top, two water tanks poured a fine rain over a rockery. In the spandrels of the arch there were terracotta bas-reliefs created by the sculptor Antoni Riba, representing children swimming. In Gaudí’s project, this waterfall was attached to the perimeter wall, but in the 1925 extension it was left as a freestanding structure. It was demolished in 1946, when part of the garden was sold for the construction of houses. The garden had another fountain at the main entrance, featuring two superimposed cups, the lower one larger and cylindrical in shape, covered with stucco, and further up, tiles with carnation motifs. The one at the top was shaped like an octagonal prism, with the sides measuring 75 × 45 cm, and was covered in ceramic tiles featuring motifs of flowers and sunflower leaves. It was removed in the extension of 1925.

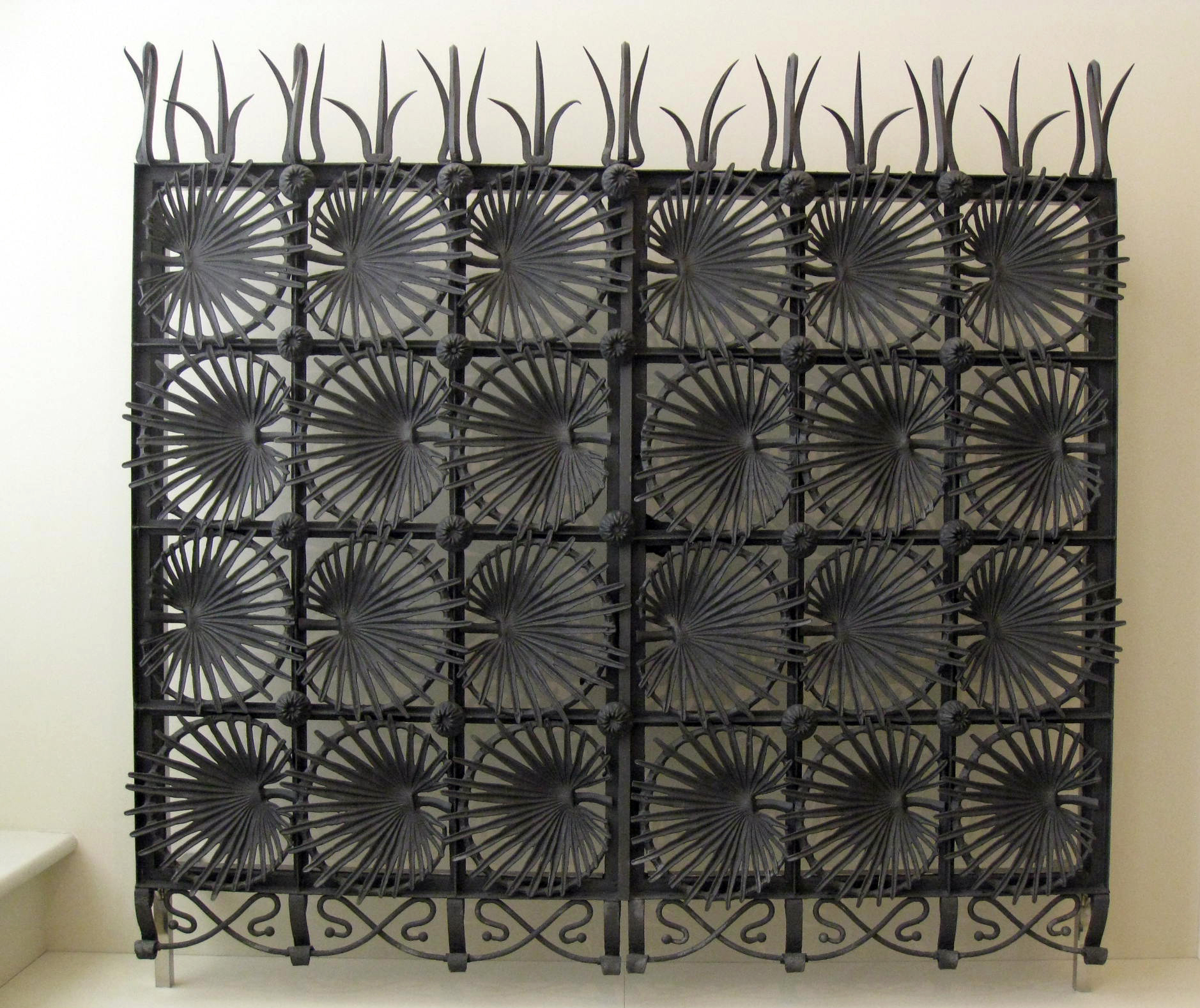
Section of the palm heart grate preserved in the National Art Museum of Catalonia

The perimeter fence of the house consisted of a stone wall with semi-elliptical battlements and a cast iron fence decorated with fan palm leaf motifs and carnations, and finished off with trident-shaped spikes, just at the main entrance. There was a small pavilion in the southwest corner, formed by two brick columns and three stone columns – the central one, geminated – that supported an L-shaped brick structure with blind arches, crowned with sloping ceramic pieces. The original fence measured 30 × 34.50 m and each frame was 0.49 × 0.49 × 0.12 cm. The design of the gate was detailed by Gaudí in the plan of the facade that is kept in the Historical Archive of Catalonia, signed by Gaudí and Vicens on January 15, 1883. Using this design, sculptor Llorenç Matamala made a plaster mould, which was later cast in iron by forger Joan Oñós. According to Gaudí’s drawing, each sheet should have been placed diagonally, but in the end, they were placed horizontally, alternating in left and right alignments. After the extension of the property in 1925, the stone wall was replaced by new sections of the palmetto fence, which then surrounded the entire perimeter. However, after various parts of the garden were sold for construction, different sections of the fence were dismantled. Some of them were used on the entrance gate to Park Güell and in Casa Larrard – home of Eusebi Güell – in the same park (now the Baldiri Reixac school), while some portions are preserved in the Gaudí House Museum.

In a piece of land next to Casa Vicens, at number 28 Carrer de les Carolines, there was a freshwater spring called Santa Rita which dated back many years. It was customary that on May 22, the day of Santa Rita, neighbours would come to drink the water from the spring. In 1895 the water was declared to be of public use and began to be sold. When Joan Baptista Serra undertook the expansion of Casa Vicens in 1925, he built a chapel dedicated to Santa Rita on the same site as the spring. In 1963 the chapel was demolished to build a new residential building.

=== Expansion and further development ===
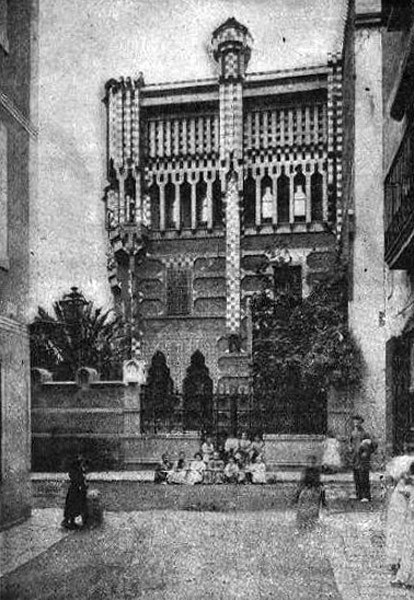
The house in 1898, in a photo published in the weekly La Campana de Gràcia

In 1899, the widow of Manuel Vicens, Dolors Giralt i Grífol, sold the house to Dr. Antonio Jover Puig for 45,000 pesetas. Antonio Jover (Barcelona, 1855-1930) was a renowned paediatrician, who had graduated from the University of Barcelona in 1876. He was living in Cuba and worked as a professor at the University of Havana, until the island gained independence and he returned to Spain. Thanks to the fortune he accrued in Ultramar, like other returning emigrants of the time, he was able to acquire Casa Vicens. He represented various Spanish commercial interests in Cuba and, even after its independence, returned to spend time on the island. He was also president of the Casino Español in Havana and the Cercle Català. He settled in Barcelona in 1924, was a councillor of the City Council of Barcelona from 1924 to 1930 and deputy mayor with Darius Rumeu i Freixa, Baron of Viver. In 1908, Dr. Jover sold the house to his brother, José Jover, maintaining usufruct of the property. When he died without issue in 1913, he left it to Ángela González Sánchez, Antonio Jover’s wife.

In 1925, Dr. Jover planned an extension of the building with the aim of turning it into his principal residence. For this, he acquired 212.88 m^{2} of land adjacent to the wall shared with the convent, on 18-20 Carrer de les Carolines. He also acquired the land located between the narrow street of Carreró Racó de Sant Gervasi and Avinguda de la Riera de Cassoles, and he was able to have the alleyway declared an unused public thoroughfare, with which he could expand the garden into that area. With this, the property had reached its maximum size of 1,738 m^{2}. He approached Gaudí to lead the project to extend the house, but he declined, as he was devoting himself fully to the Sagrada Família at the time. Instead, he recommended one of his protégés, Joan Baptista Serra, who designed the right half of the facade in the style of Gaudí.

Joan Baptista Serra de Martínez (Barcelona, 1888-1962) studied at the Barcelona School of Architecture and graduated in 1914. That same year he met Gaudí at the church of Saints Justus and Pastor and they were brought together through their love of music. Eclectic in style, he was influenced by both Modernism and Noucentisme, Classicism and modern European architecture. One of his first works was Casa Cucuruy in Barcelona, which was followed by his own house, Villa Mercedes, on Carrer de les Escoles Pies; Eduard Schäfer’s house, on Carrer de Copèrnic; and Casa Valentí Soler, on Via Laietana, among others. He was the municipal architect for Montcada i Reixac, Ripollet, Begues, Molins de Rei and Sant Feliu de Codines, where he carried out various projects, such as the Ripollet Market, the Begues urbanisation, a school development and a sanitation and paving project in Molins de Rei, and the churches of Santa Engracia and Sagrat Cor in Montcada i Reixac.

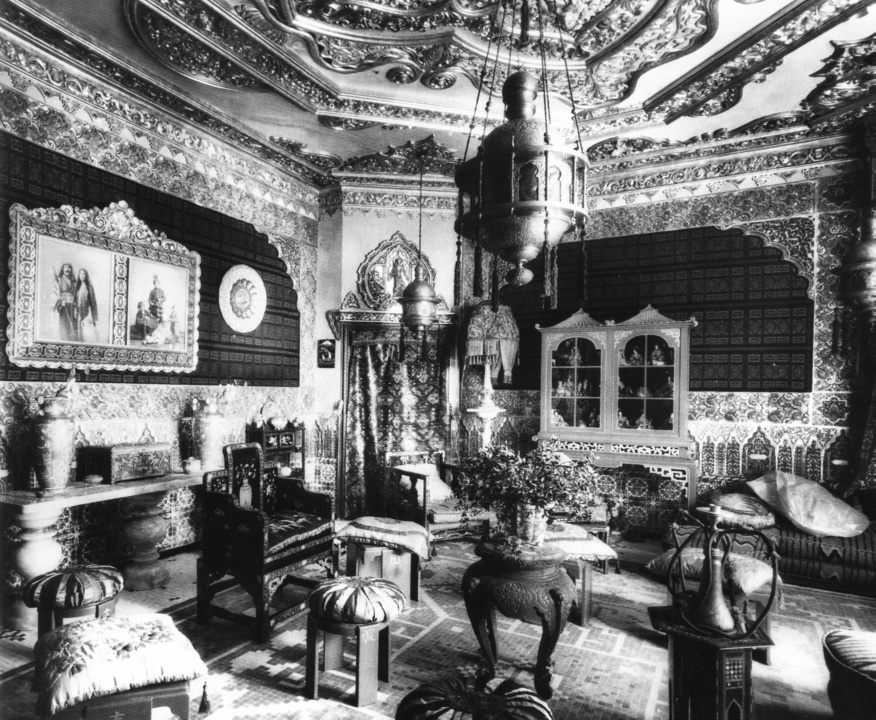
Historical photo of the interior of Casa Vicens

Serra built the right half of the building; seen from Carrer de les Carolines, and visible because it protrudes slightly onto the street, unlike the part built by Gaudí. The division is also noticeable by the different design of the tiles; Gaudí alternated them to give greater dynamism, while Serra arranged them in a uniform fashion. The extension took place between 1925 and 1927.

The extension was carried out on the side where the dividing wall with the old convent was located; a new facade appeared, and the building became fully detached. At the street corner, Serra constructed a turret in the form of a small pavilion, identical to the one Gaudí placed at its opposite end. The renovation involved converting a single-family house into three independent houses, one per floor. To this end, the original staircase designed by Gaudí was replaced by another to be used for its new purpose.

Another alteration was carried out in the covered porch, where the wooden latticework was replaced by glass, therefore closing the space entirely and losing the original idea of a space that connected directly with the garden. The water fountain, one of the most evocative elements of Gaudí’s project, was also removed.

On the southwest side, when the narrow street disappeared, the perimeter wall had to be torn down and replaced by new sections of the palmetto fence. He kept the waterfall that was attached to the wall, which remained as a free-standing construction, and he opened the parabolic arch on the opposite side. However, the rockery at the base was removed and a pool was put in its place. Part of the structure of the waterfall was also clad in tiles, to imitate those of the house.

He also built a small chapel at the end of the garden overlooking Avinguda Riera de Cassoles, which housed the old Santa Rita fountain. It was circular in shape and covered with yellow tiles, with a hemispherical dome which was decorated with tiles and topped with a lantern with a cross on top. Demolished in 1963, today the old gardens are occupied by residential buildings.

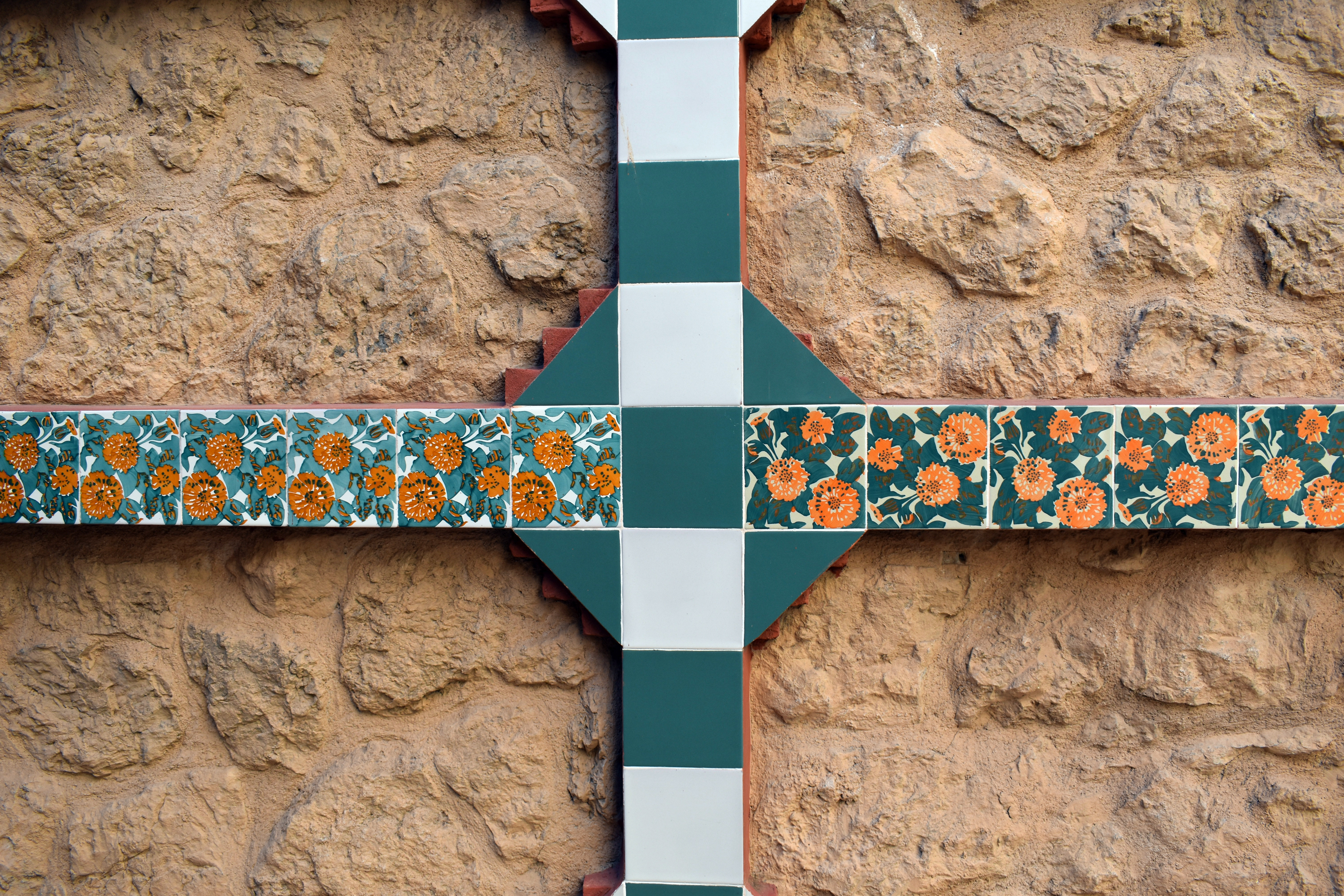
The vertical strip marks the transition between Gaudí's original part (right) and Serra's enlargement (left). Note that Gaudí alternated the position of the tiles to give dynamism, while Serra arranged them uniformly

Carrer de les Carolines was widened in 1925, bringing the house to street level. For this reason, the entrance door was moved to the southwest facade, where the covered porch is located, in the place that was previously occupied by a foyer window. A terrace with stairs was built to access the house. For its part, the old portal was converted into a double window with cast iron bars. A secondary door for the staff that was next to the dividing wall of the convent – and is currently a window – also disappeared, as well as a terrace located above this entrance that led to one of the bedrooms on the second floor, replaced by a balcony. The main street entrance shifted a little to the left and two lampposts, made by the blacksmith Bonaventura Batlle, were placed on top. A secondary entrance was situated on the corner of Carrer de les Carolines and Avinguda de la Riera de Cassoles, identical to the main one. The chapel viewpoint on the corner, overlooking Carreró Racó de Sant Gervasi, was maintained, although when it disappeared, it remained an element of the wall. Finally, the fountain at the entrance was removed, which was located in the part that disappeared from the southeast side when Carrer de Sant Gervasi was widened.

Inside, Serra’s intervention was more restrained than outside, with the use of new construction materials of the time, such as iron joists with ceramic vaulting on the ceilings. He replaced the old staircase designed by Gaudí with an interior patio that gave light to the adjoining rooms and installed a new staircase in the extended part. The basement lost a room due to the widening of the street, although it gained another under the new terrace located at the main entrance. The interior finishes of the extended part were simpler than those of Gaudí’s project, based essentially on mosaic floors, plastered and painted walls, and plaster ceilings with moulding around the edges. The bathrooms were decorated with Andalusian tiles, showing flowers and a pomegranate in the centre.

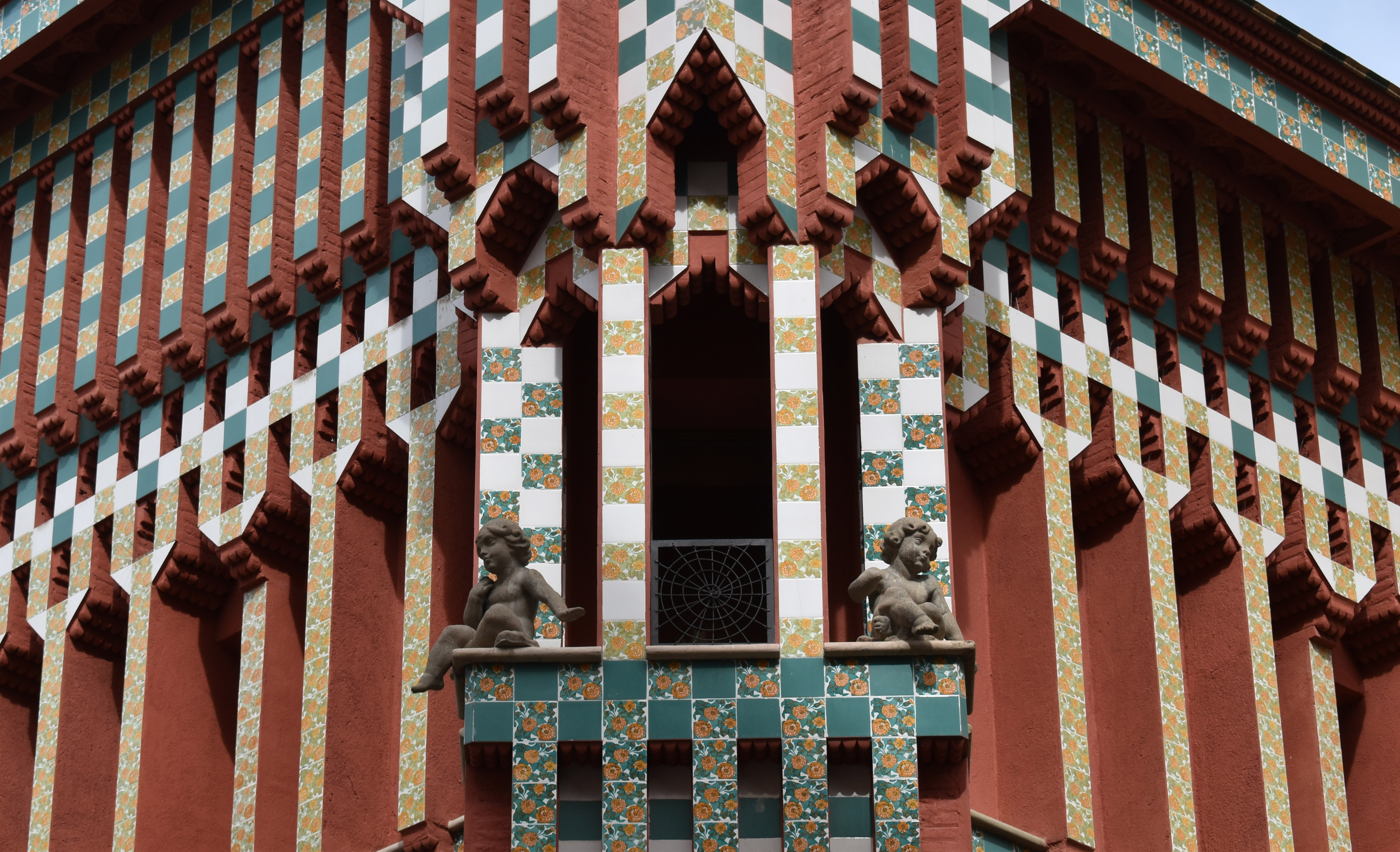
Terracotta putti located in the corner corresponding to the Serra extension, in imitation of the originals by Antoni Riba of the Gaudinian project

In 1927 Casa Vicens won the Best Building Award by Barcelona City Council, due to the renovations and extension carried out by Joan Baptista Serra, although, secondarily, it was also to recognise the work of Gaudí. The prize, of 1,000 pesetas, was awarded on March 5, 1929. Gaudí had won this prize in 1900 for Casa Calvet, one of his more conservative works.

The building underwent a new extension in 1935, when the architect Francisco Víctor Ortenbach Bertrán was commissioned to add a new area to the ground floor, on the west side of the facade.

In 1946 part of the garden was sold for the construction of houses, which included the waterfall, which was demolished, as well as the old viewpoint. (Note: In 1976, on the fiftieth anniversary of Gaudí’s death, the reconstruction of this waterfall was planned in Reus, his birthplace, but the project failed.) The portion of the garden that included the chapel of Santa Rita was separated from the rest.

In 1962, Dr. Jover’s widow, Ángela González Sánchez, died, leaving her children, Antonio, Gaspar, María de la Paloma and Fabiola as heirs. After the distribution of her assets, Casa Vicens was left to Fabiola, who was married to the gynaecologist Antonio Herrero López (Zaragoza, 1914 - Barcelona, 2004), who had his clinic at Casa Vicens. The following year, another part of the garden was sold for the construction of houses and the chapel of Santa Rita was demolished. Most of the palmetto fence was dismantled, some portions of which were later placed at various points in Park Güell. The property was then left at its current size, and architect Antonio Pineda Gualba was commissioned to renovate the basement and the ground floor, carried out in 1964. An entrance to the basement was then opened from street level, under the staircase of the main door.

The house was restored in 1997 with a project by Ignacio Herrero, a member of the owner’s family, an architect by profession. Work was mainly carried out on the facades and roof.

In 2001, upon Fabiola’s death, the inheritance was passed to her sons Antonio, Ignacio, Carlos María and Javier Herrero Jover.

=== Awards ===
Casa Vicens was declared a Historic-Artistic Monument by virtue of Decree 1794/1969 of July 24, 1969 (Boletín Oficial del Estado of 20 August 1969). Alongside this, other Gaudí buildings were also declared: the Temple Expiatori of the Sagrada Família, Park Güell, Palau Güell, Casa Milà, Casa Batlló, Portal Miralles, Casa Calvet, Casa Figueras (Bellesguard), the Güell Pavilions and the Col·legi de les Teresianes in Barcelona; the crypt of Colònia Güell in Santa Coloma de Cervelló; the Cooperativa Obrera Mataronense (Mataró Workers’ Cooperative) in Mataró; Casa Botines in León; the Episcopal Palace of Astorga; El Capricho in Comillas; and the liturgical elements installed in the main chapel of the Palma Cathedral. The decree states that “Gaudí’s work is of exceptional interest within contemporary architecture. It brings together mechanics, construction and aesthetics and shows a high degree of sincerity. This signature style, present throughout his work, exposes Gaudí as an innovator with a strong personality. This, however, does not prevent many of his original solutions from being based on architectural tradition, specifically on the distinctive Gothic style of the Catalan region. The figure of Gaudí, extraordinarily valued throughout the world, has managed to turn his work into the most interesting and enduring exponent of the notable artistic movements of our time.” It also defines Casa Vicens as “one of the first landmarks of oriental-inspired Modernism, with the novelty of polychrome facades with natural materials in various textures combined with glazed ceramics”.

In 1993 it was declared a Cultural Asset of National Interest (BCIN), in accordance with the provisions of Law 9/1993 of September 30 on Catalan Cultural Heritage.

In July 2005, Casa Vicens was declared a World Heritage Site by UNESCO. Three other works by Gaudí were also declared at this time: the Nativity facade, the crypt and the apse of the Temple Expiatori of the Sagrada Família and Casa Batlló in Barcelona, and the crypt of Colònia Güell in Santa Coloma de Cervelló. Park Güell, Palau Güell and Casa Milà, had previously been granted the status in 1984. In its statement, UNESCO stated that “these works attest to the exceptional contribution of Gaudí’s creations, to the evolution of architecture and construction techniques in the late nineteenth and early twentieth centuries. They reflect a personal, very eclectic style to which Gaudí gave free rein, not only in architecture, but also in the design of gardens, sculptures and indeed many other arts”.

=== Sale, restoration and opening to the public ===
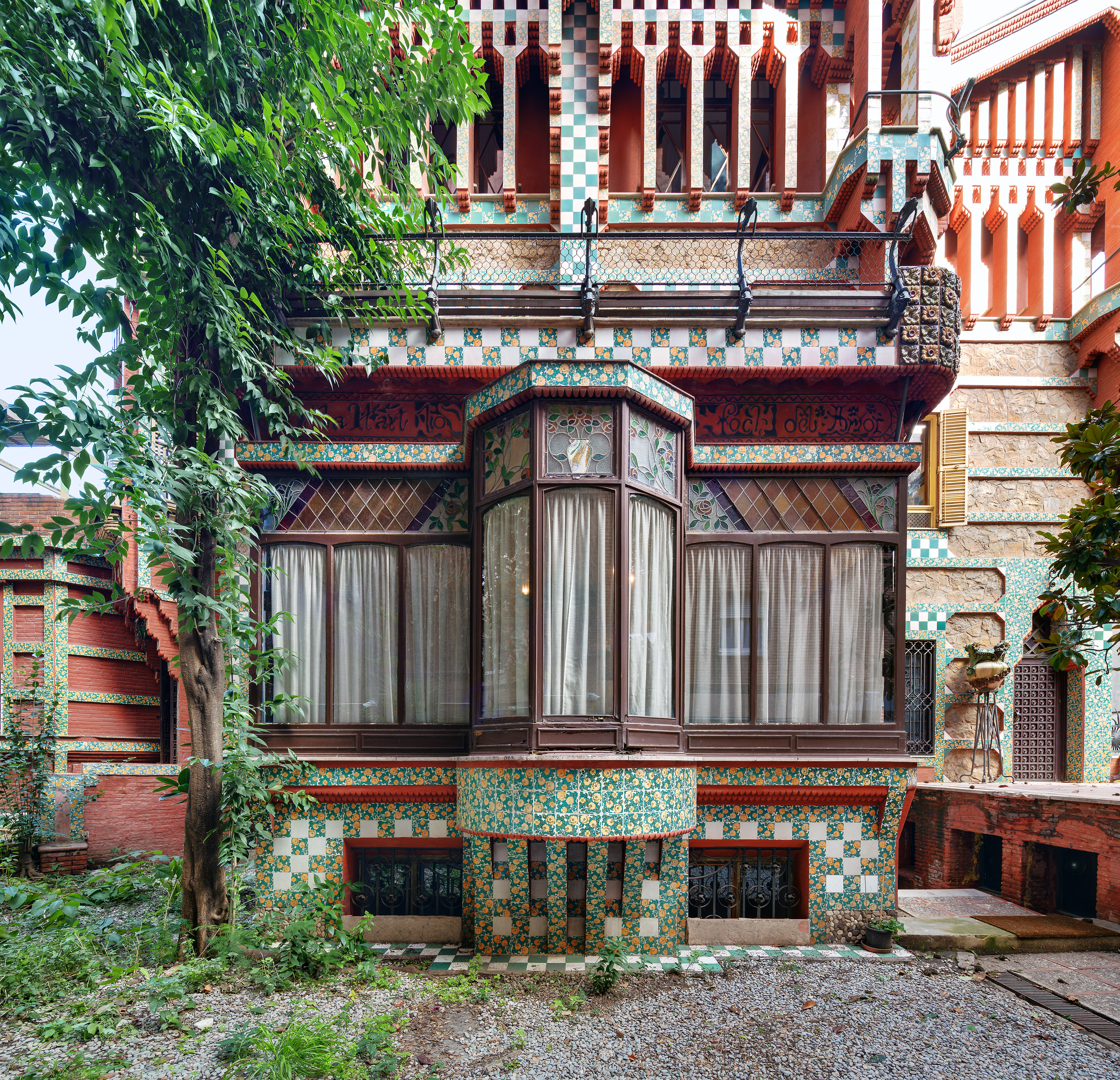
The tribune before the restoration, with the glazed enclosure installed in 1925 by Serra

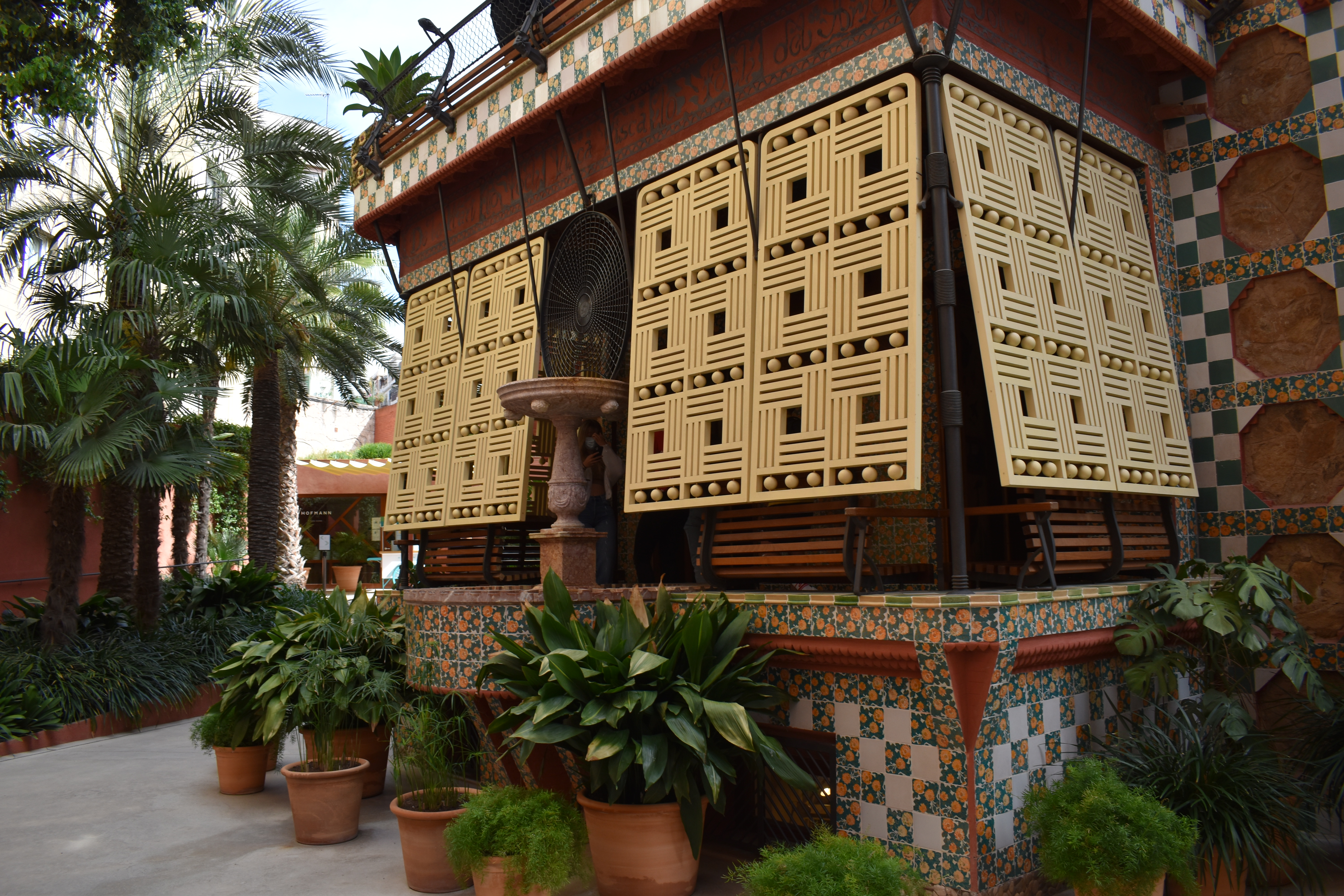
The tribune after the restoration, according to the original Gaudinian project

In 2014, the Herrero Jover family sold Casa Vicens to the Andorran bank MoraBanc, which turned the property into a house-museum after its renovation. It opened its doors to the public on November 16, 2017.

The restoration was carried out by architects Elías Torres and José Antonio Martínez Lapeña, together with David García of the firm Daw Office SLP, between 2015 and 2017. Among the work carried out, the old staircase was replaced by a more modern one and adapted to the new use of the house as a museum, and a lift was installed. The levels added in 1935 and 1964, which had distorted Gaudí’s original work, were removed. More work was carried out in the porch, where the glass enclosure was replaced by a system of tilting shutters with a latticework of geometric shapes. The water fountain was also recovered, as in Gaudí’s original project.

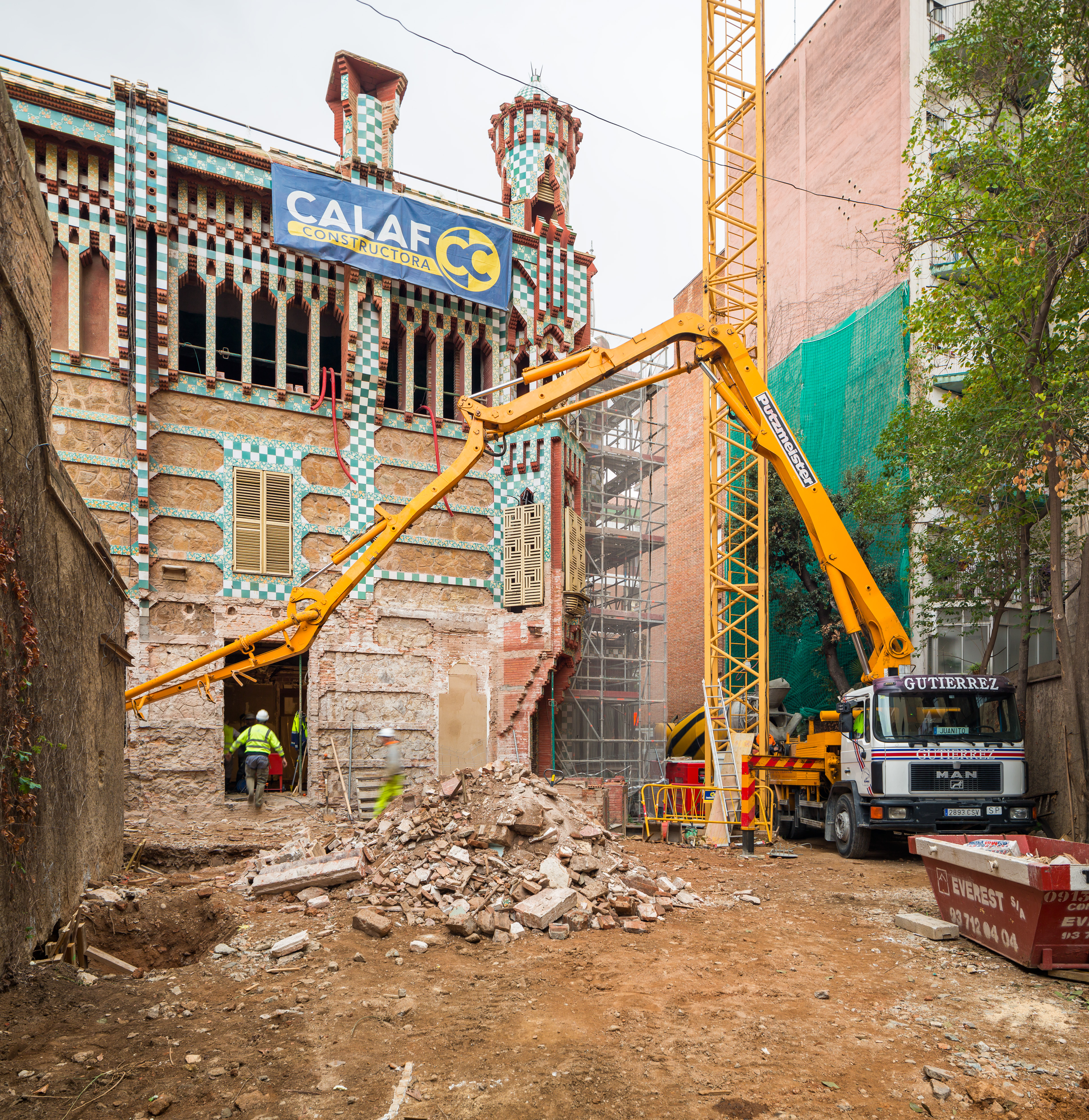
Casa Vicens during the restoration works

By focusing the tour on the rooms of the original Gaudí project, the extension made by Serra in 1925 was converted into a reception area for visitors on the ground floor, as well as a space for fixed and temporary exhibitions on the first and second floors. In the exhibition space on the second floor there is a fireplace made by Gaudí for the house of Manuel Vicens in Alella, as well as plans of the project made by Gaudí and a 1:33 scale model of the estate. The exhibition is complemented by some audiovisuals of the Gaudí project. In the basement there is a bookstore, and in the garden area, a café.

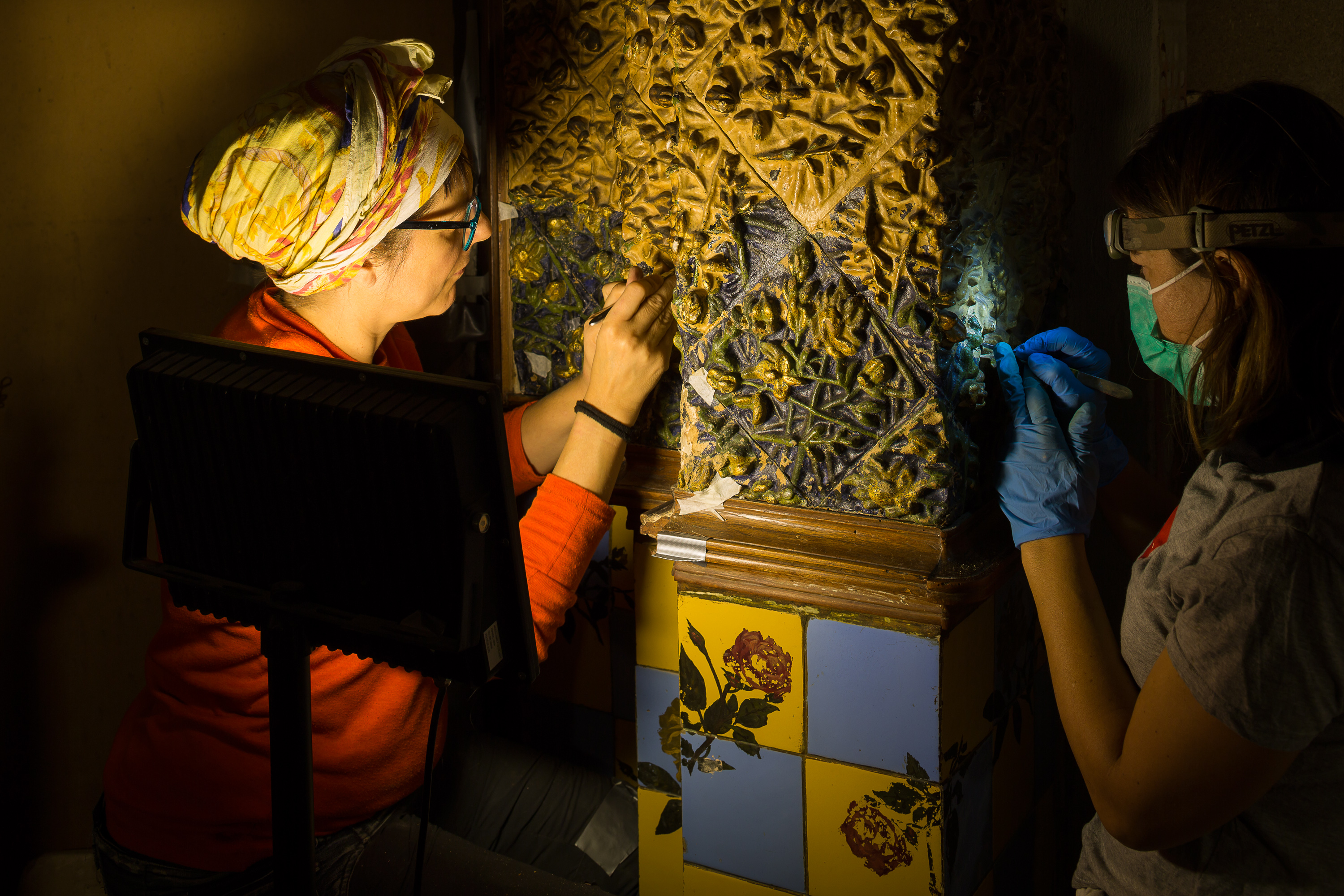
Ceramic restoration

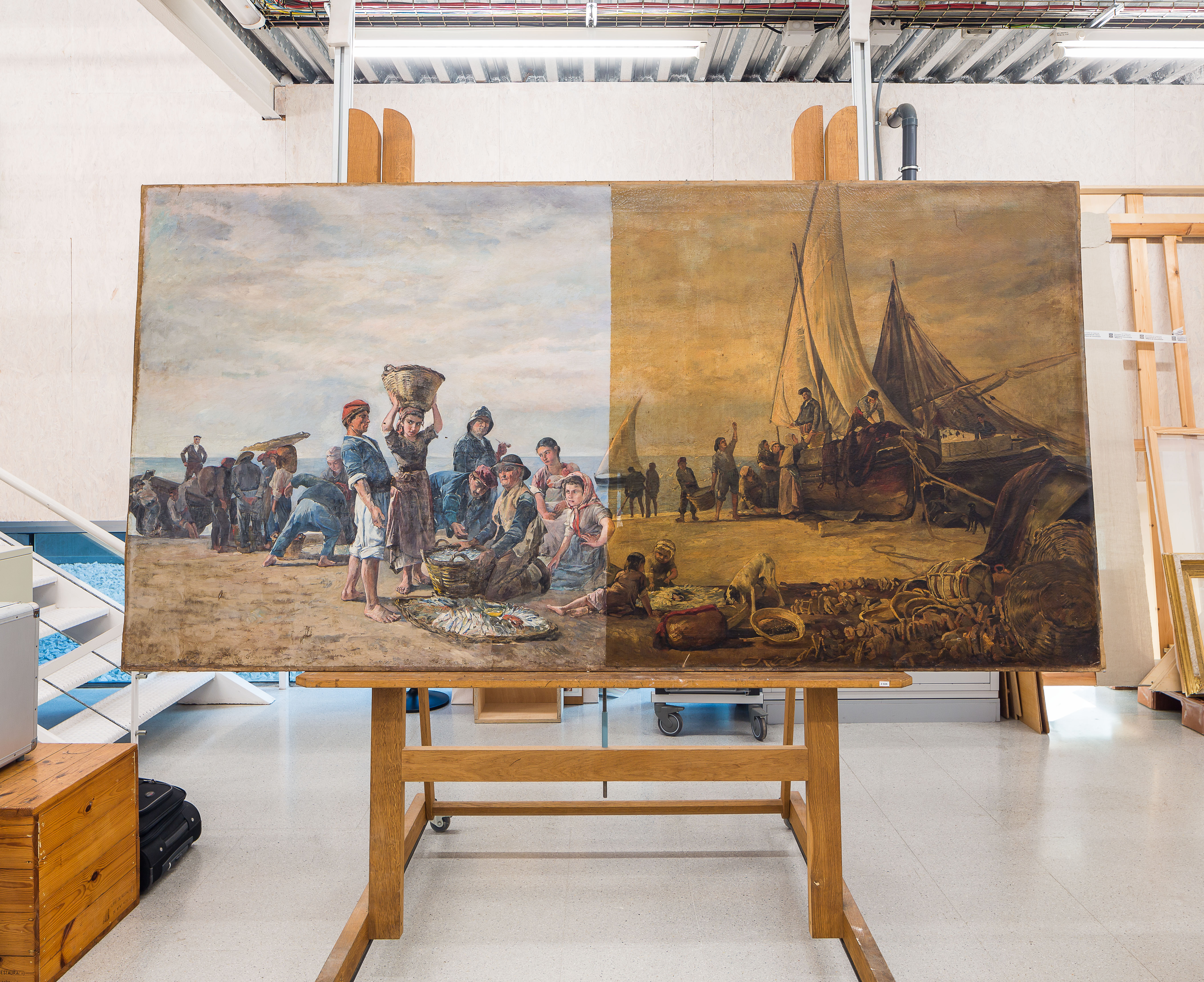
Restoration of paintings

During the renovation process, the Torrescassana paintings were restored, a process carried out by the company Policromia in collaboration with the Generalitat de Catalunya’s Centre for the Restoration of Artefacts of Catalonia. The work consisted of cleaning the canvases, retouching the pictorial layer and reinforcing the mounts. A number of ceramic tiles that had deteriorated were restored, a work carried out by Manel Diestre, of Sot’s Ceramics Studio, with the same stencilling technique as the originals. The lamps in the house were also restored, a project led by the architects responsible for the restoration, alongside a number of specialists in various techniques such as wood, ceramics, metal, mural painting, fabric and stone.

The restoration project was a finalist for the FAD Architecture Award in 2018, as well as the XI Ibero-American Biennial of Architecture and Urbanism in 2019. It won the Rehabilitation Award in the First Edition Lledó Iberian Architecture Awards in 2018 and was awarded at the XIV Spanish Biennial of Architecture and Urbanism 2016-2017 in 2018. According to the FAD jury, “the architects have presented a comprehensive and very careful rehabilitation of this first work by Gaudí”.

After the discovery of some original plans made by Gaudí, in 2019 a reconstruction of the waterfall designed by the architect for the garden was made, which was placed in the Museu Agbar de les Aigües in Cornellà de Llobregat.

== Description ==
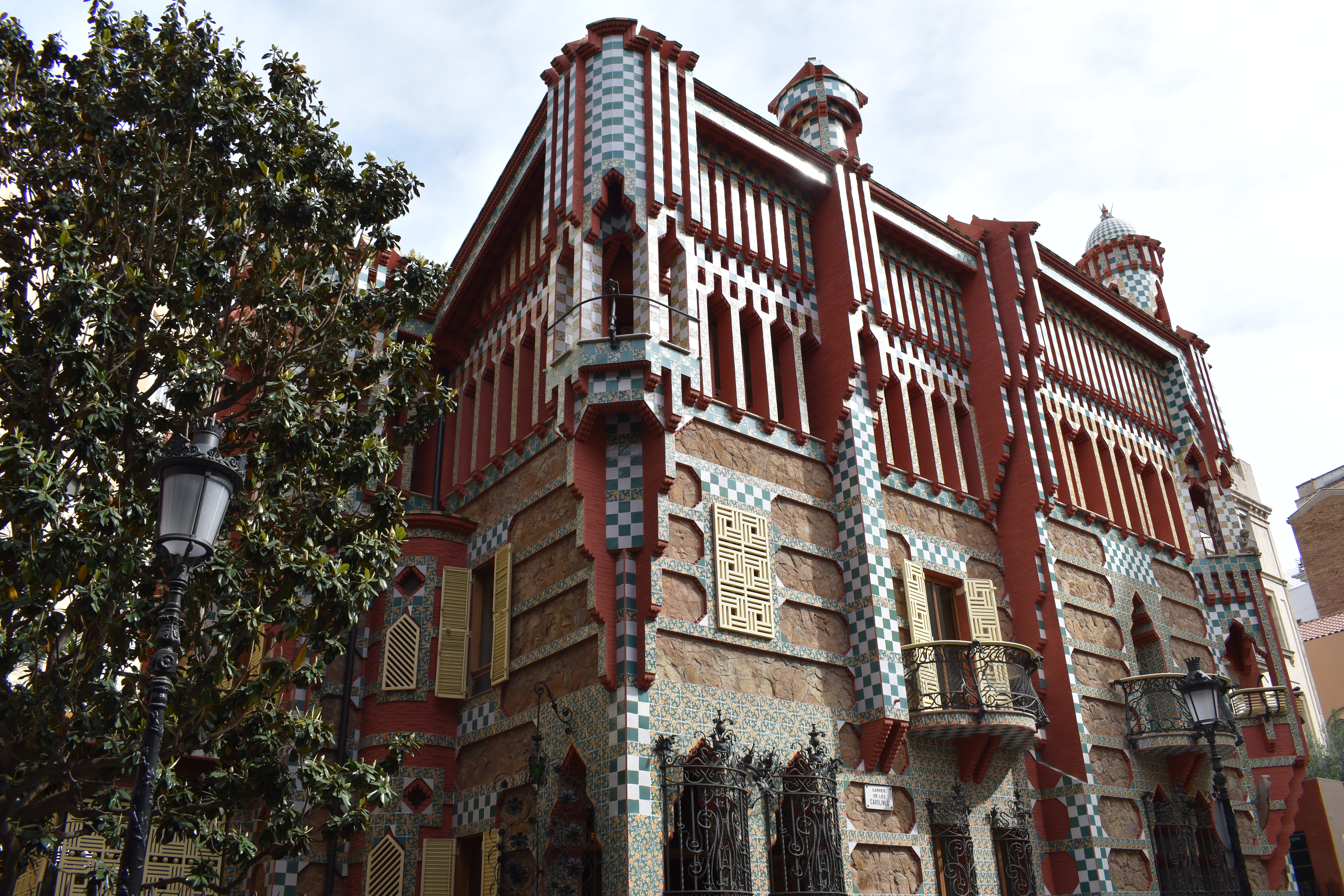
View from the Carrer de les Carolines

The current site has an area of 711 m^{2} and the constructed area is 1,239 m^{2}. It is structured on four levels or floors: a basement to be used as a wine cellar and storage room; two floors with living spaces, the first with a kitchen, dining room and various other rooms, and the second with the bedrooms; and the attic used for the staff quarters. Gaudí used the traditional Catalan technique of building load-bearing walls and enclosures with vaults and wooden joists. This is still far from what would come to be his future construction solutions; those based on regulated geometry, despite the waterfall in the garden already featuring the parabolic arch, one of his future hallmarks. On the walls he combined faceted masonry, exposed brick and ceramic tiling.

The architect designed a property where summer was the main focus, and this was integrated into the surrounding garden. The structure is based on the straight line – contrary to a preference for the curved line which he would later introduce – which provides dynamism through the inward and outward sections of the structure. Similarly, the building conveys a sense of spatial continuity between the interior and exterior, thanks to the covered porch on the main floor and the gallery on the second floor, as well as the various balconies and terraces and the latticework that he applied to the openings. All this gives the building a feeling of lightness and clarity, an almost ephemeral construction, which was the first architectural showcase of his career.

=== Exterior ===
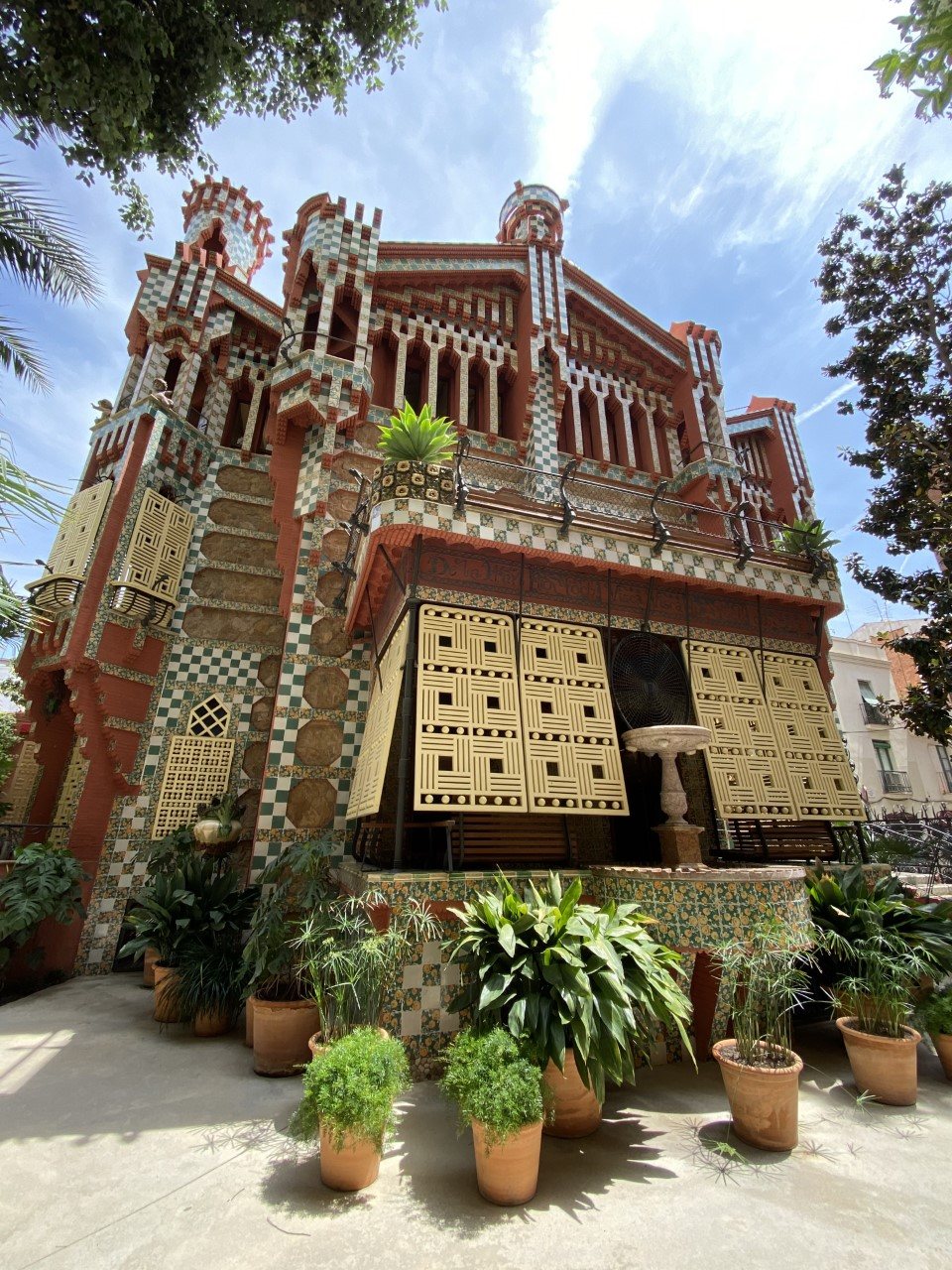
Garden facade

The structure of the house is based on the straight line, with the loads distributed among parallel walls. This simplicity is mitigated by the decorative richness, in which Gaudí unleashed his abundant imagination. The walls of the house are made of alternating masonry with rows of tiles, which feature the yellow flowers that Gaudí had discovered on the site of the house before construction, called Indian carnations or Moorish carnations. The tiles have a modular measurement of 15 cm.

The walls stand out for their prominent sections, which is a feature of Islamic architecture. Masonry ashlars alternate with the tiles, some with plant motifs and others in a green and white check design. The different surfaces and geometric effects create chiaroscuros, which accentuate the chromatic diversity of the exterior. On the second floor of both the street facade and the garden there is a continuous gallery of mitred arches that surrounds the upper part, closed off with oriental-style wooden latticework. The corners feature galleries at 45 degrees, with balconies supported by brick brackets in successive overhangs. On the parapets of the balconies there are terracotta putti, the work of Antoni Riba. The lower part of the overhangs of the windows contains edges which are formed by large drops in rounded pyramidal form, measuring 4 × 4 × 4 cm, that alternate with coffers in the form of shells and plant motifs.

The southeast facing wall which looks onto Carrer de les Carolines was the original entrance to the house and was moved during the 1925 renovations due to the widening of the street and the loss of the garden space, which was originally between the facade and the entrance gate and measured three metres long. Two windows were placed where the door was located and covered with cast iron bars. The right half of the facade, which protrudes out onto the street from the left, corresponds to Serra’s extension. The original facade was 7.5 m long, and seven further metres were added with the extension. The first floor has two rounded balconies, which contrast with the straight shapes found on the facade. On the roof, in the central part of the original facade, there is a chimney, while the right corner – part of the extension – features a small pavilion at the top.

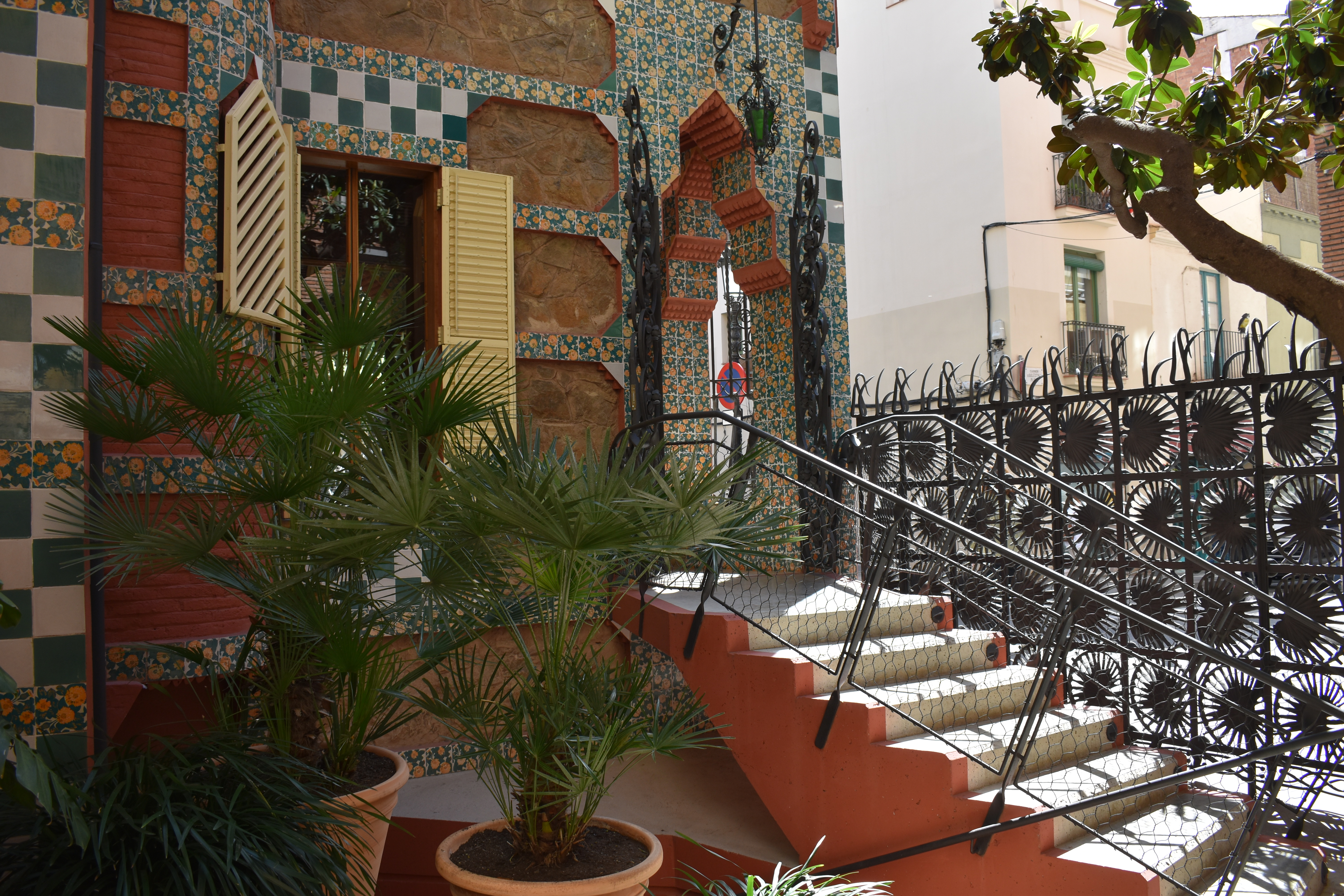
Main entrance

The southwest facing facade, looking out onto the garden, was the main outer wall in Gaudí’s project. It is structured over three different levels, one for each floor. On the first level, the external area of the covered porch is visible in the central part and connects with the dining room on the main floor, which is flanked to the right by the entrance to the house – a window in the original project – and on the left, by the door to the smoking room. On the first floor, which is more understated, there is a balcony overlooking the bedrooms. The second floor, with the attic, is noticeable for its tile cladding and features a chimney at the top, while on the left corner a small pavilion emerges, with a cupola. The pavilion marks the maximum height of the house, 17 m.

On the outside, the covered porch has a height of 5.5 m, which includes the upper terrace. At the centre, the water fountain sits on a semi-circular base, decorated with carnation tiles. The latticework that surrounds the porch is made of wood and measures 2 × 2 m; it is inspired by the orient and reminiscent of a style of Japanese shutters called shitomi. Gaudí was able to learn about this system at an exhibition of Japanese architecture held in Barcelona in 1881. The terrace located above the porch has wooden benches with metal railings and planters in the corners, decorated with tiles that alternate flowers and sunflower leaves, similar to those used in El Capricho in Comillas.

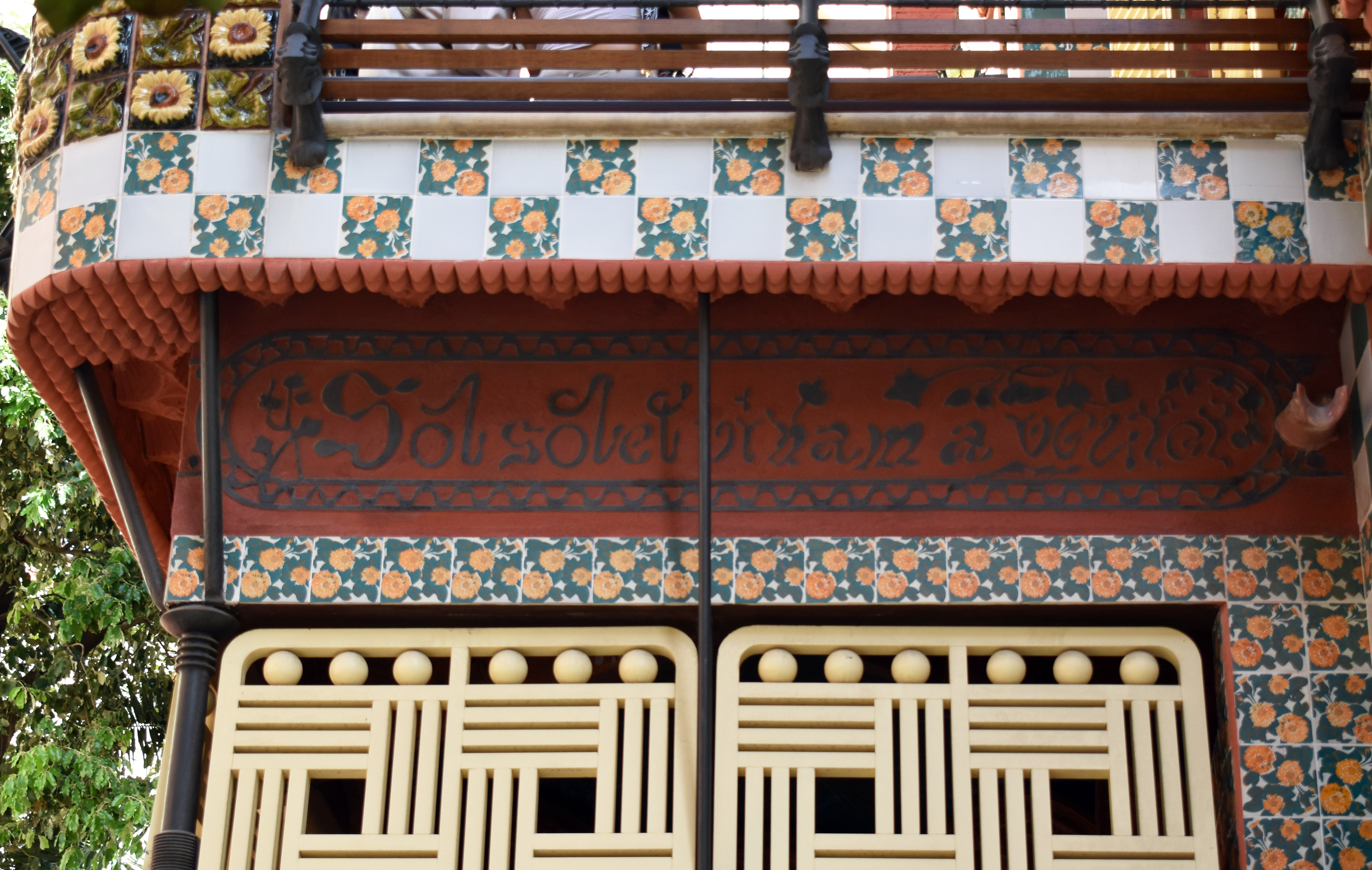
Tribune registration: sol, solet, vinam a veure ("sun, little sun, come and see me")

On the frieze of the covered porch there are a selection of phrases from Catalan folk songs: “Sol, solet, vinam a veure” (“Sun, little sun, come and see me”) on the southeast side; “Oh, l’ombra de l’istiu” (“Oh, the shade of summer”) on the northwest side; “De la llart lo foch, visca lo foch de l'amor” (“From the hearth, the fire, long live the fire of love”) on the southwest wall.

The main door of the house, next to the covered porch, comes from the 1925 renovation, as it used to be on the street facade. Elevated above the ground, it is accessed by a stairway which has a metal railing. The door has two hinges on the sides made of cast iron with floral motifs. The doorway is shaped like a rectilinear mitral arch, decorated with large teardrop-shaped sculptures hanging from the ceiling. In the 1925 renovation, a terrace was placed in front of the door, which was removed in the 2017 restoration. Above the door is a cast iron lamp with plant motifs.

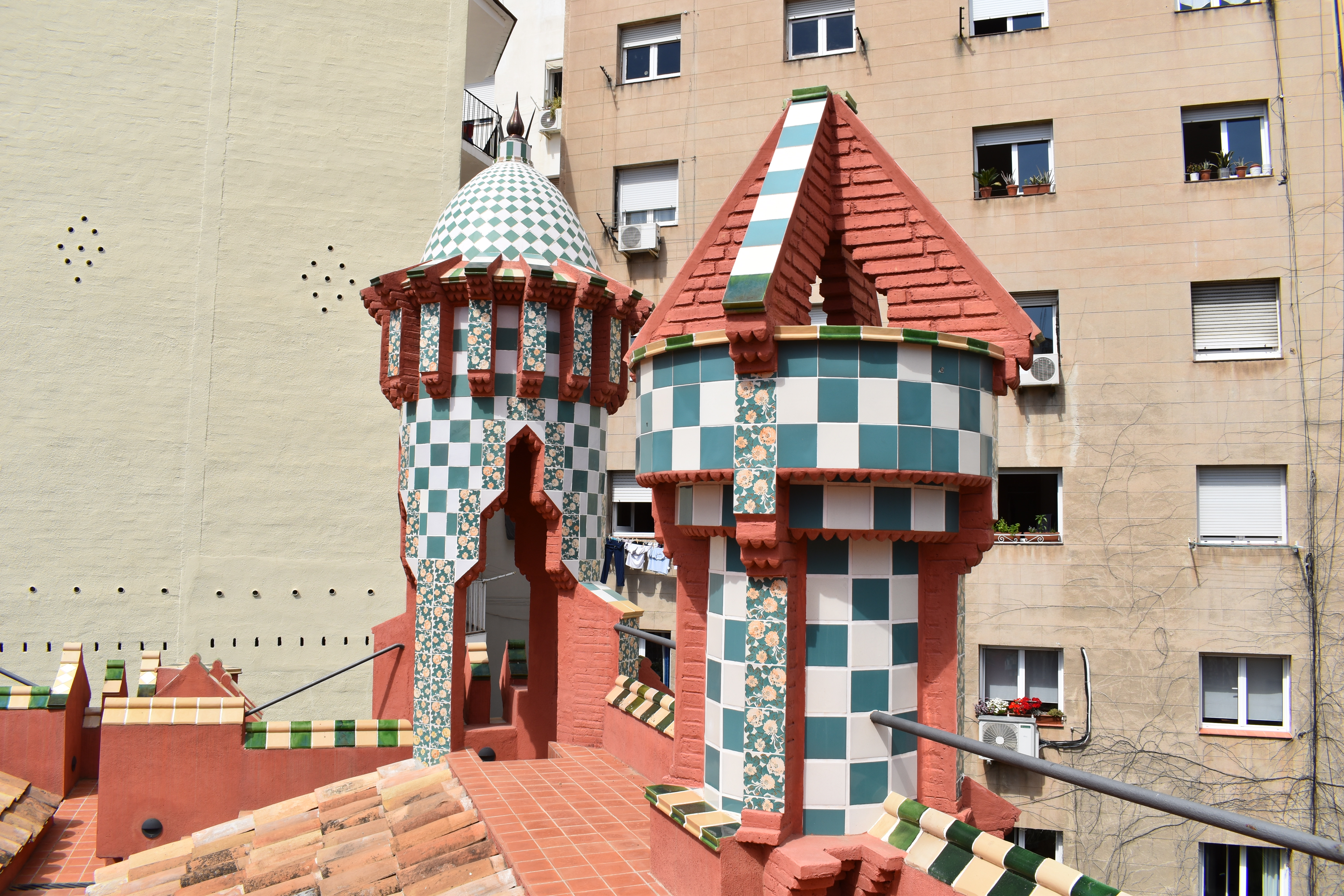
Chimney and roof pavilion

Access to the smoking room consists of four steps, decorated with carnation tiles, and two spiral-shaped railings showing flowers with elongated stems. The door is made of wood, featuring oriental-inspired geometric shapes. The adjoining window also has a wooden shutter with rounded pieces arranged alternately in horizontal and vertical positions. Above the door is a lamp, identical to that of the main entrance. Next to the entrance is a ceramic vase decorated with flowers and a faun’s head.

The remaining two facades have the same design as the others. Half of the northwest facing facade looking onto the street – in this case the left-hand side – belongs to Serra’s extension. On the other side, the northeast facade is entirely Serra’s work, since in Gaudí’s project this side of the house shared a dividing wall with the neighbouring convent.

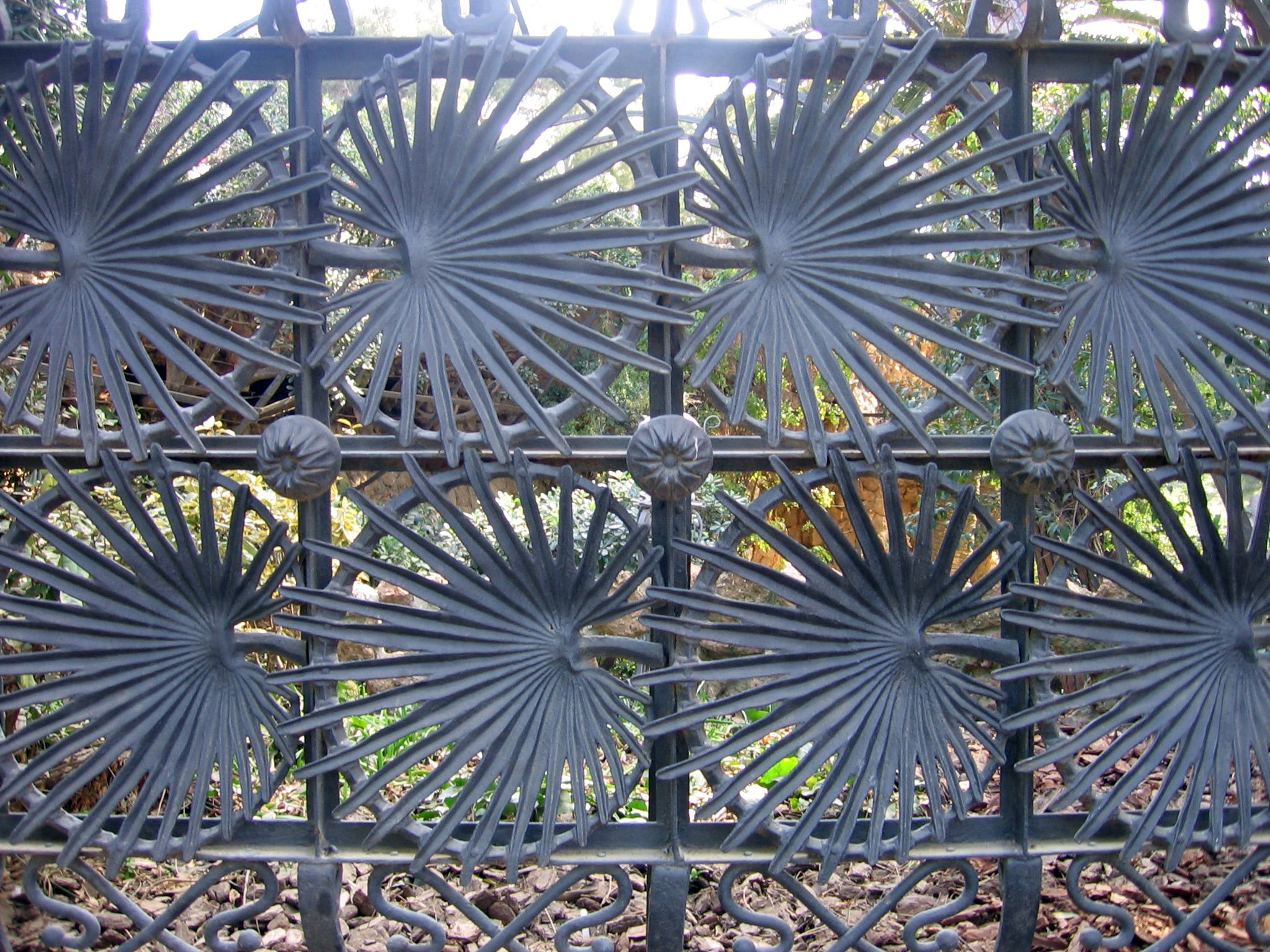
Grille inspired by the palm leaf

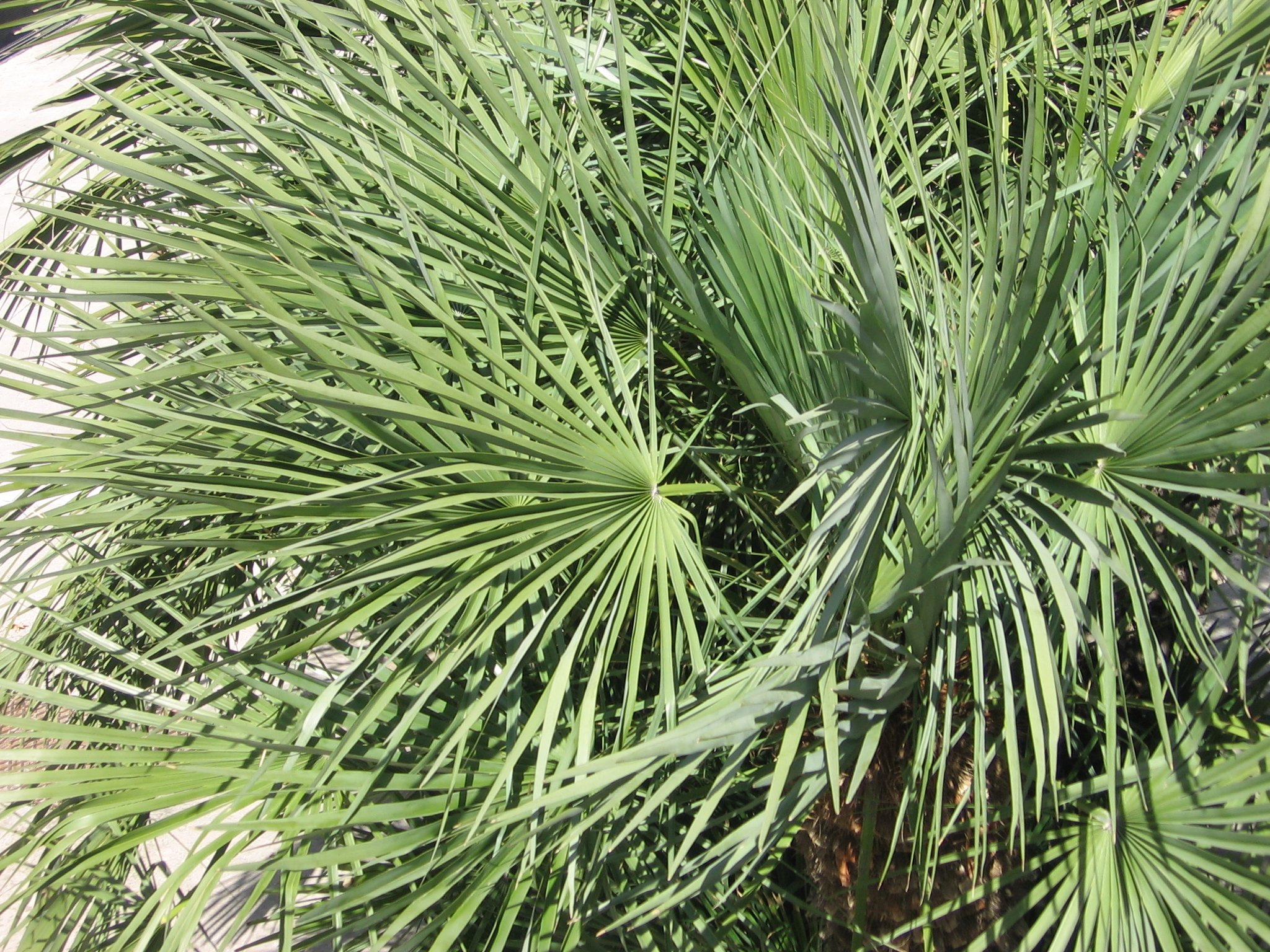
Palm leaf

The roof has an area of 150 m^{2}, of which 85 m^{2} belongs to the original house designed by Gaudí and the rest to Serra’s extension. The two projects also differ in their roofs: the original roof has four pitched sides built on the wooden beams of the attic roof, covered by rows of Arabic tiles, with a walkway of ceramic tiles that allows access to the small pavilion on the corner and the chimneys; the area built by Serra has a flat terrace, with steps leading to the other small pavilion at the opposite angle. These small pavilions – Serra’s is an exact replica of Gaudí’s original – are clad in tiles, combining carnations with green and white check, and a cupola crowned with a bronze flame. The fireplaces are made of brick and also clad in tiles. Access to this space features the old entrance gate from Carrer de les Carolines, when the main access was located on the southeast side, removed in the 1925 renovation. It displays floral motifs with round stems.

At the entrance to the street is the gate decorated with palm leaves and carnation flowers designed by Matamala and made by Oñós. It has a height of 2.3 m. The gate features two lamps above it which were included in the 1925 renovation and are attributed to the Bonaventura Batlle studio.

The current property has a garden which is much smaller than the original, but which tries to recreate the garden designed by Gaudí as far as possible. It includes palm trees (Phoenix, Trachycarpus), magnolias, roses and climbing plants. The garden also contains a niche which replicates the former chapel that contained the image of Saint Rita, rebuilt by the architects who carried out the renovation of the property, although without the effigy of the saint.

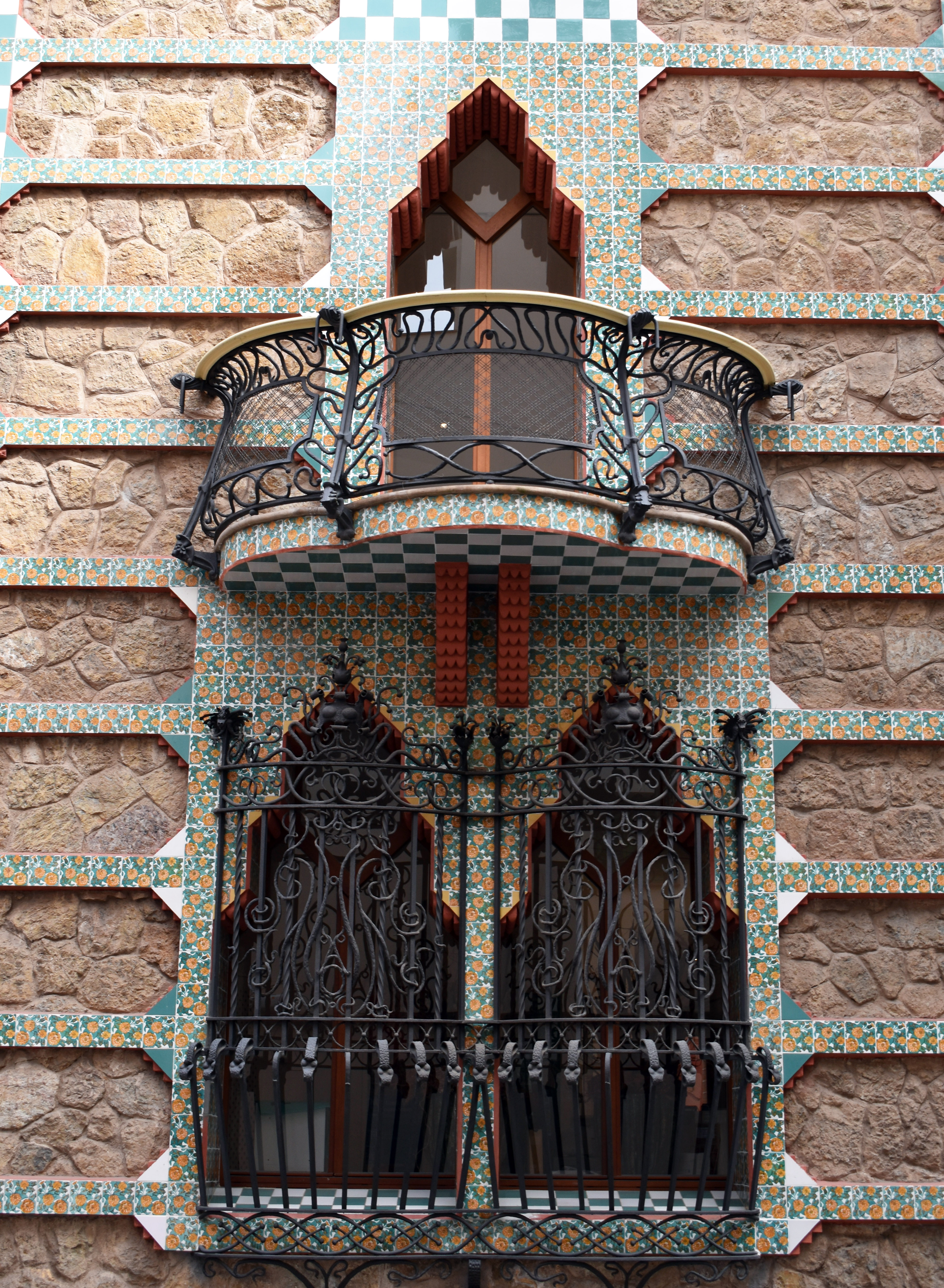
Windows with wrought iron grille and upper balcony

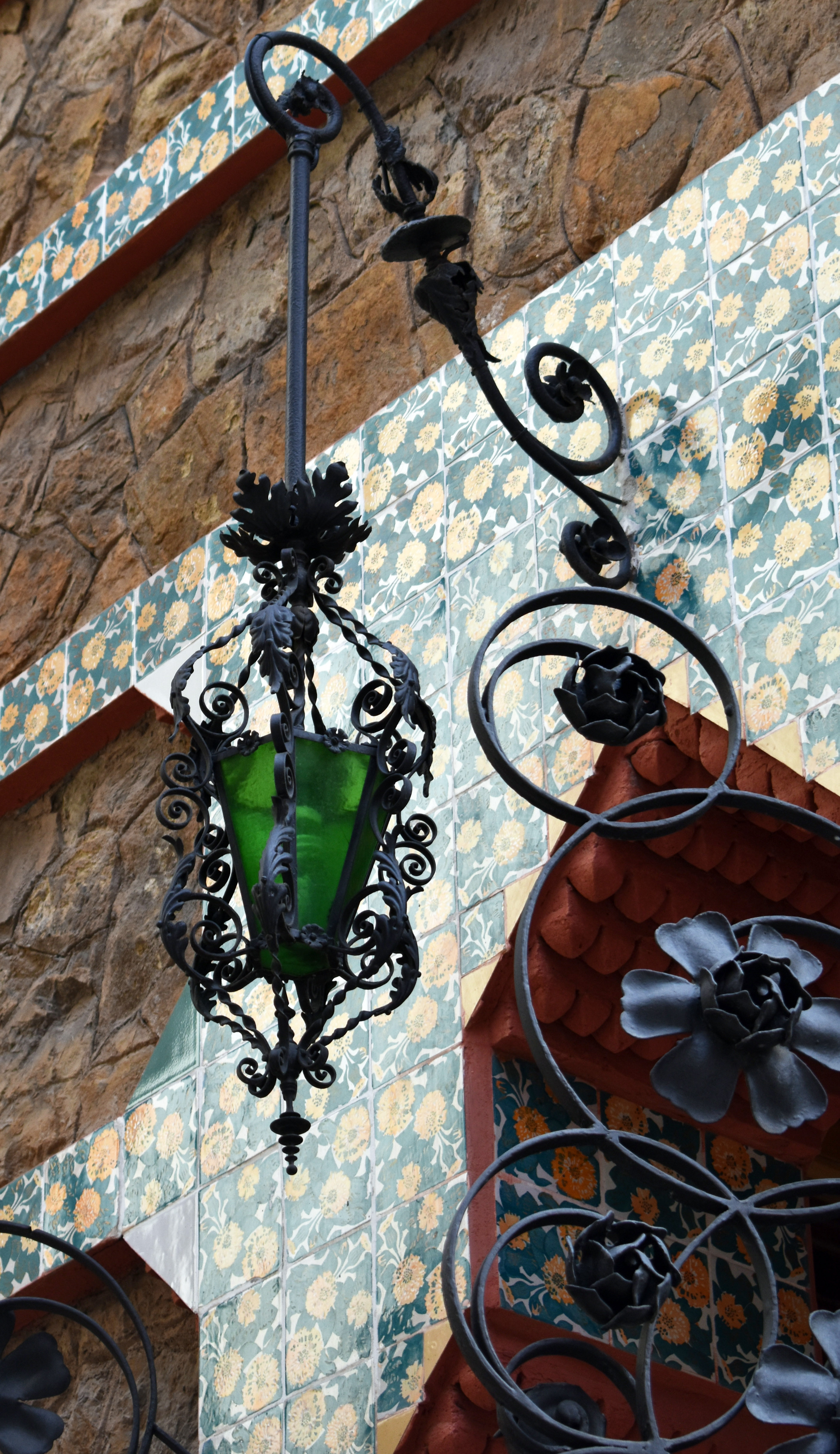
Entrance door lamp

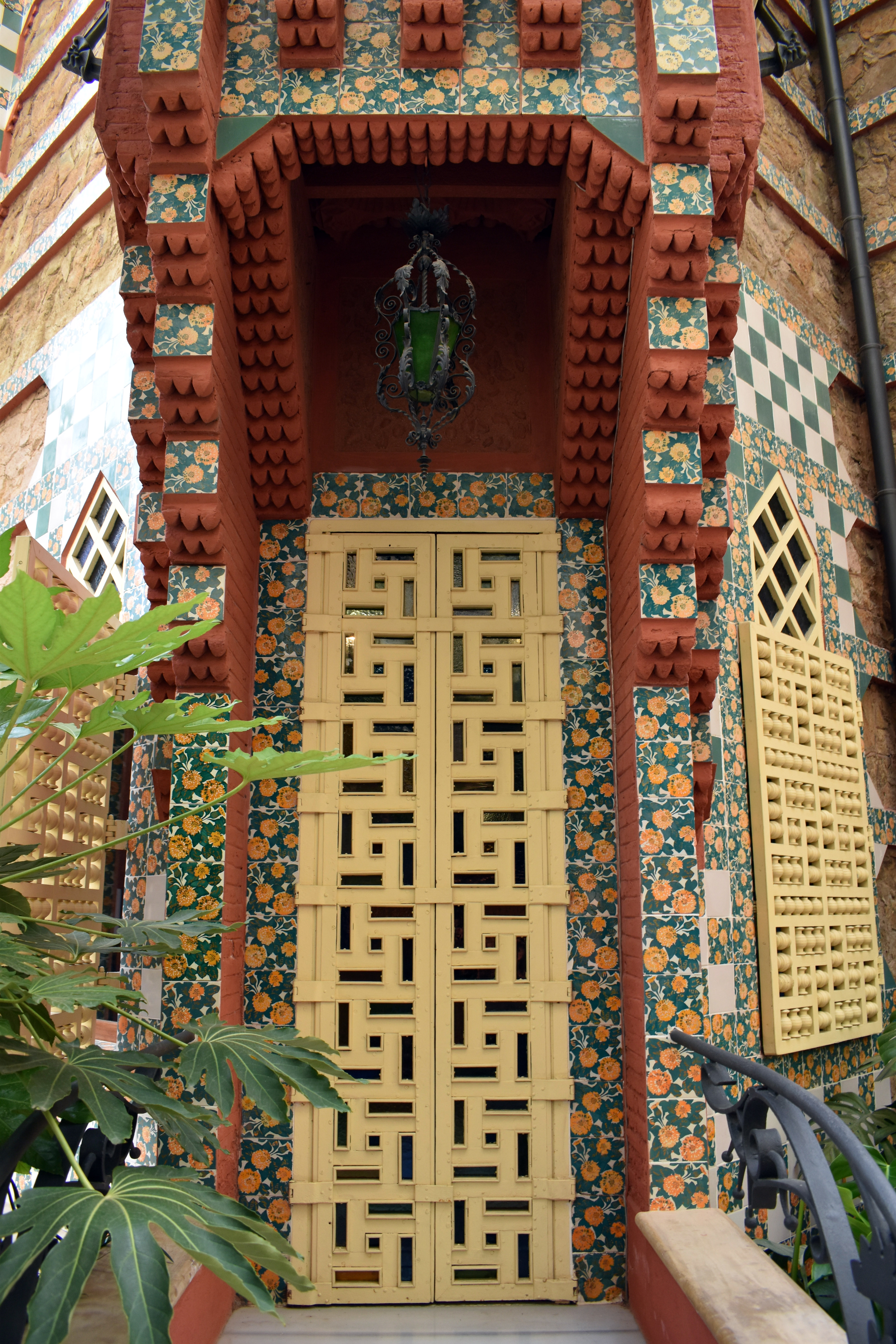
Smoking room door

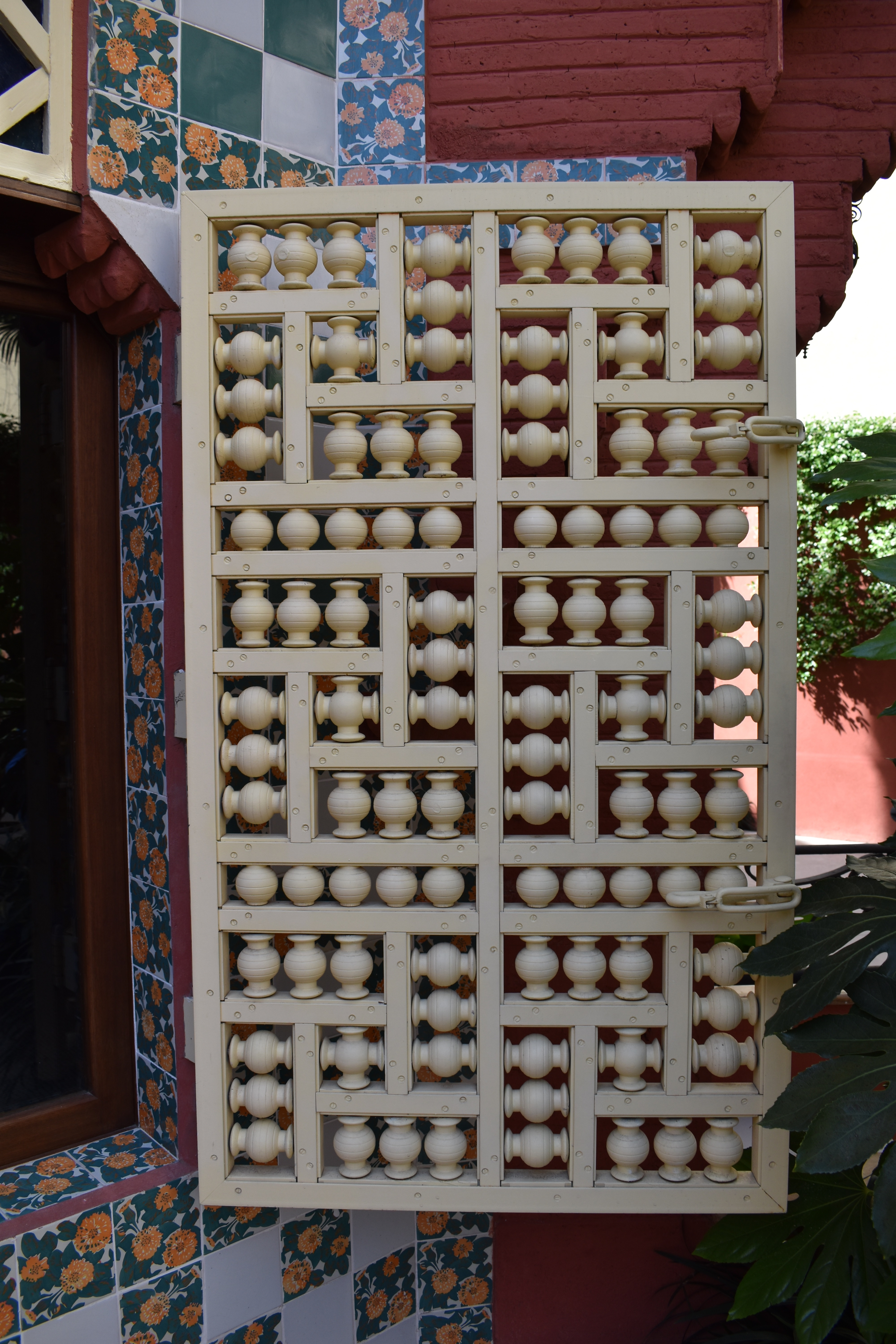
Smoking room window

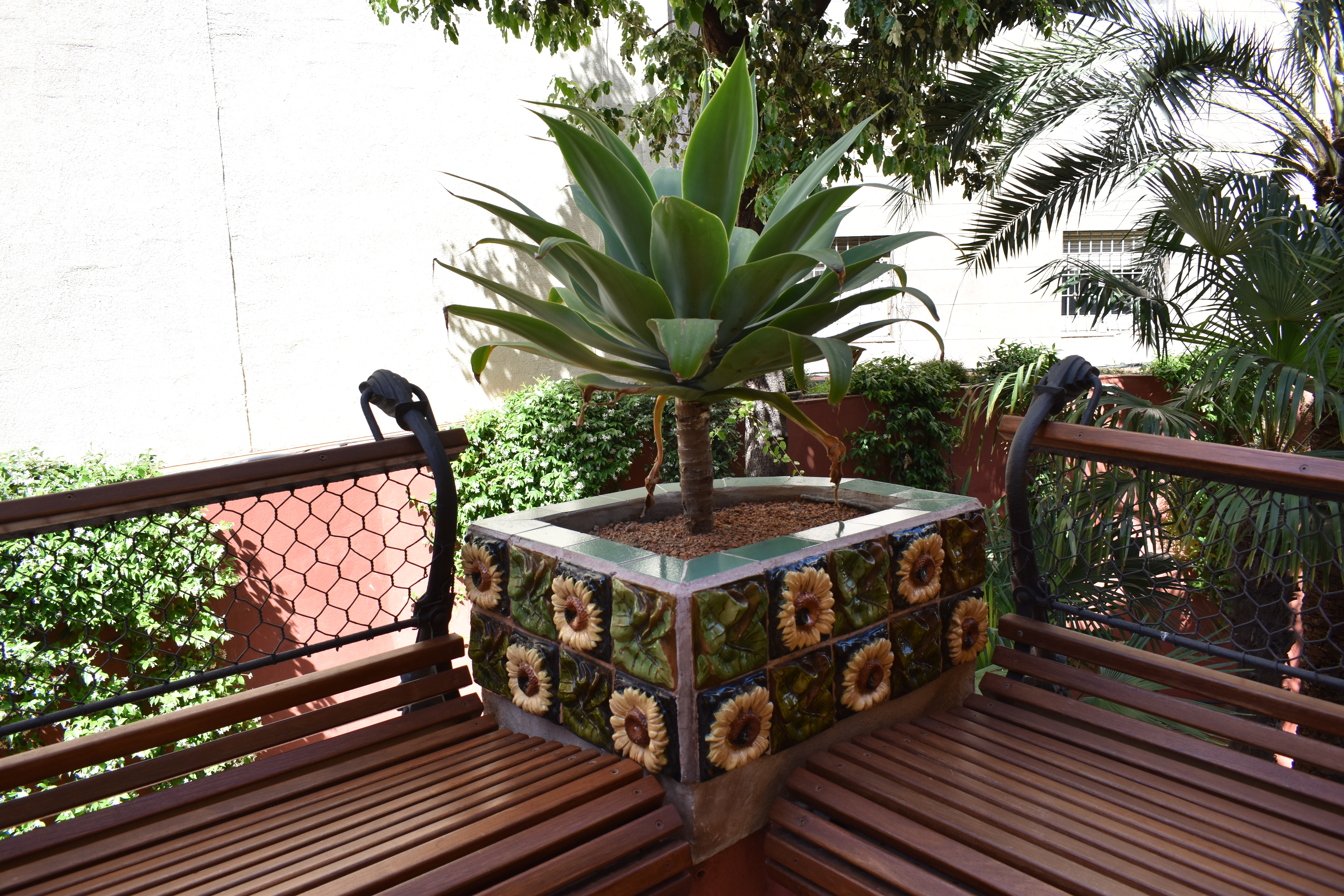
Planter with flower tiles and sunflower leaves

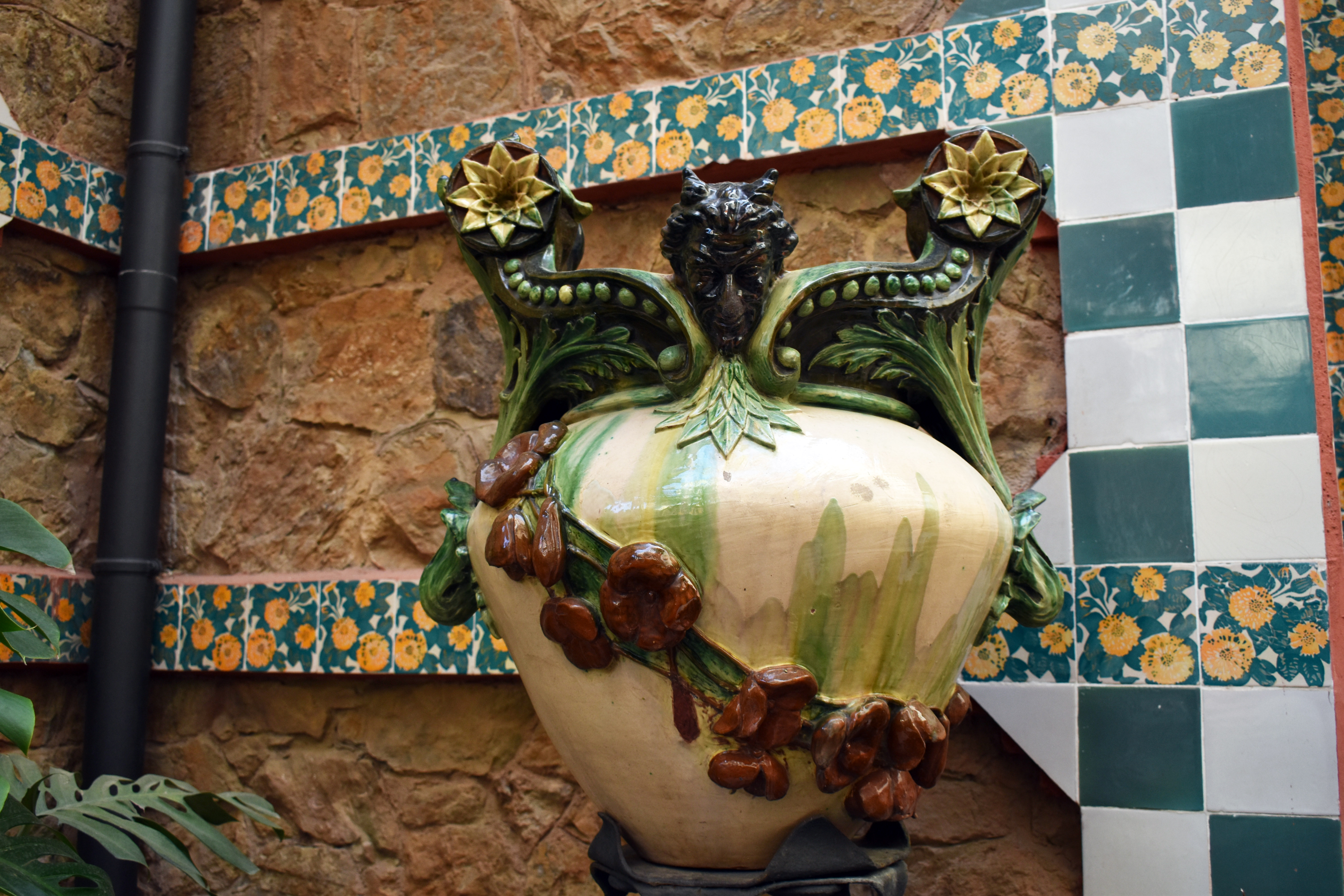
Ceramic vase

=== Interior ===
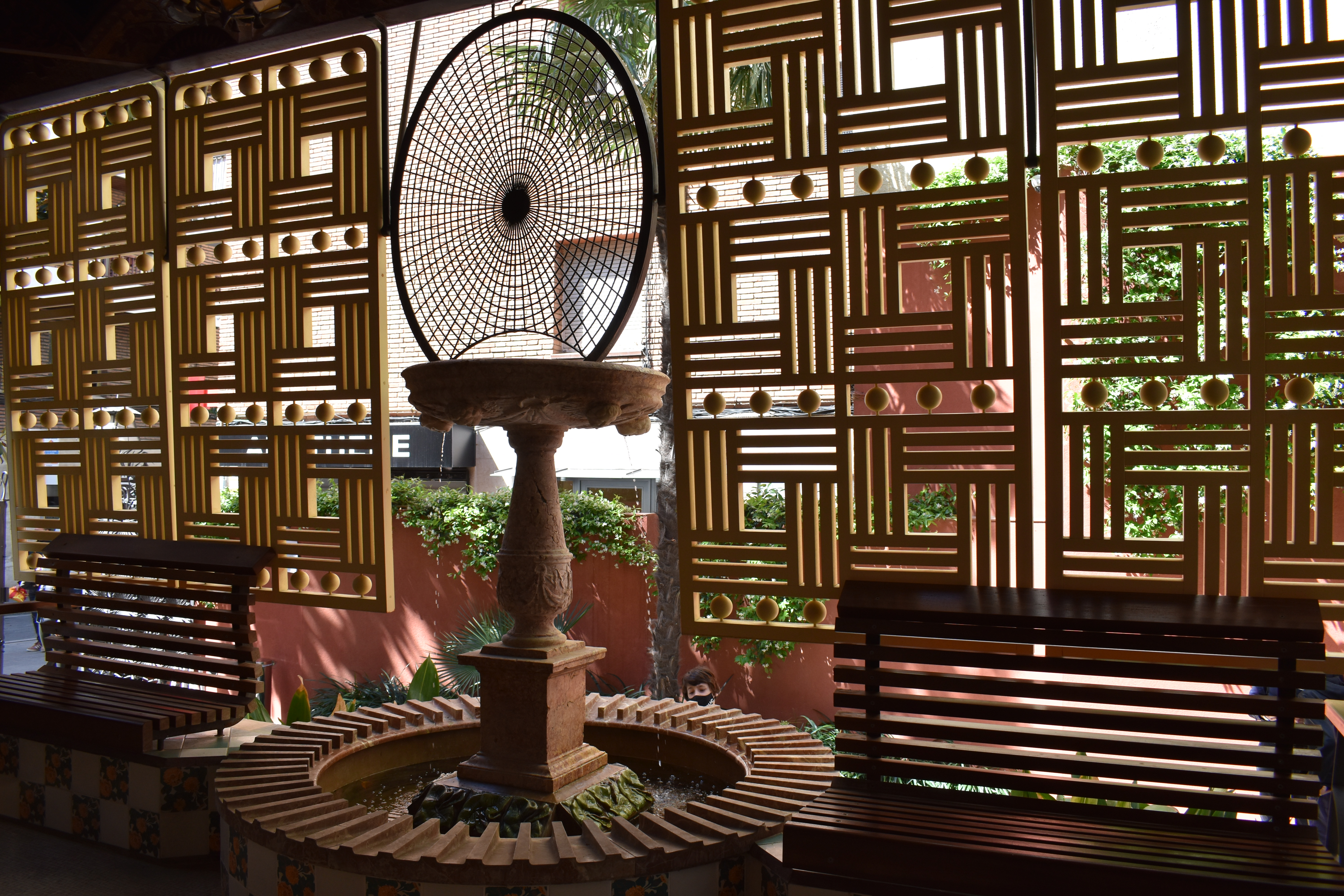
The porch from the inside

The house’s interior consists of masonry walls, with partitioned vaults in the basement and wooden beams on the other floors. Gaudí distributed the various rooms with small hexagonal hallways, so that they could be isolated by closing the doors. The architect designed a functional structure, using each one of the floors for a specific purpose: the basement as a wine cellar and storage room; the main floor for general family use, including the dining room, porch, smoking room, kitchen and laundry room; the first floor for the bedrooms, bathrooms and library; and the attic for staff accommodation. Gaudí designed all the furniture in the house, including the sliding doors and the cast brass locks on the cabinets.

Access to the house is through the main floor (162 m^{2}), which contains a foyer, dining room, porch and smoking room as the main rooms. The front door gives access to a porch, through which the foyer is accessed. The door is made of wood, decorated with a grid in which circular mouldings have been inserted. The foyer has a roof made from wooden beams with polychrome mouldings, as well as sgraffito on the walls showing plant motifs. From the ceiling hangs a cast iron and glass lamp, Islamic in style, which came after the work of Gaudí.

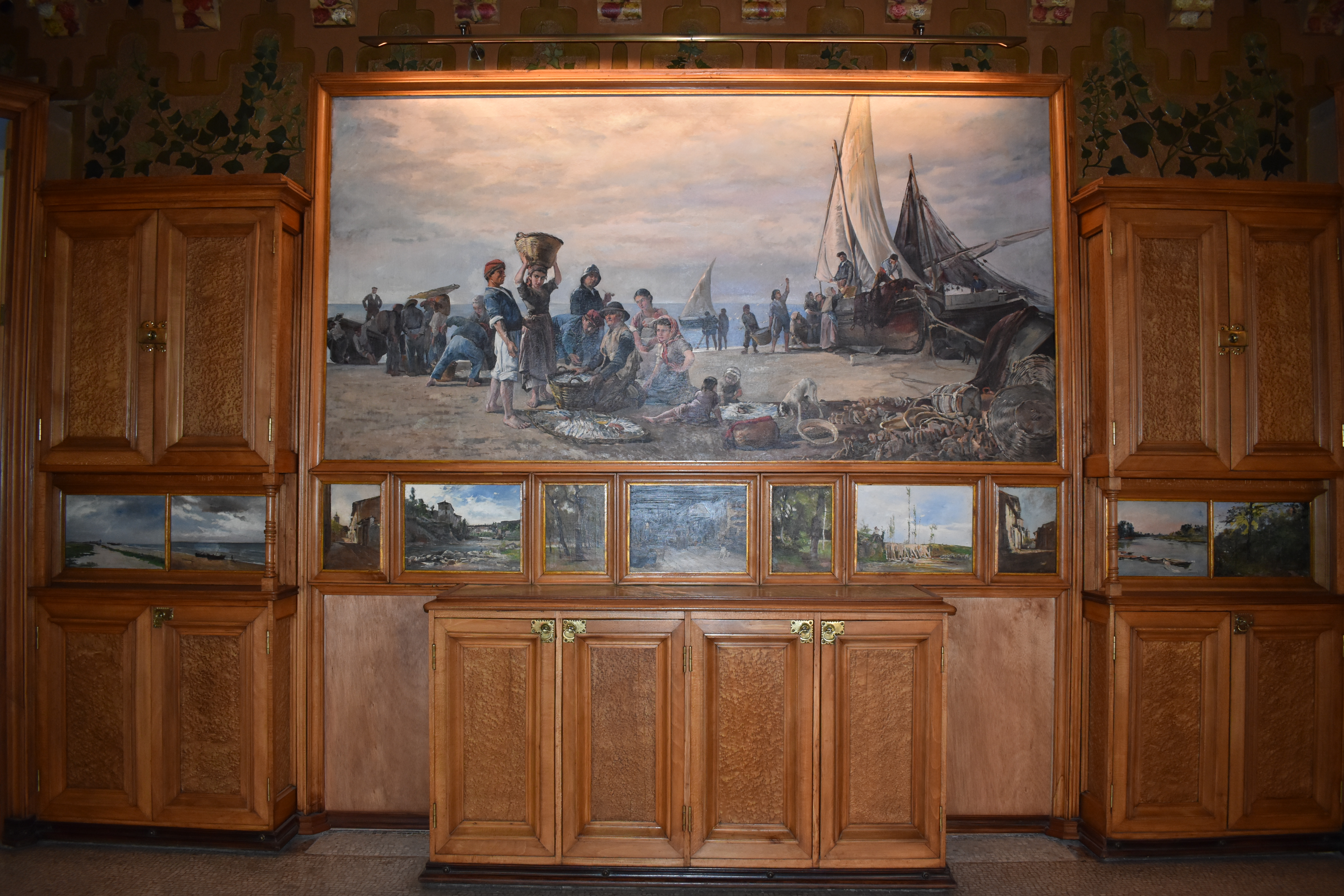
Dining room

The dining room (32 m^{2}) is decorated with climbing ivy made of stucco on a gold background in the free spaces of carpentry and tiling, alternating with papier-mâché with fruit motifs and strawberry leaves between the roof beams. The floor is made of opus tessellatum Roman mosaic. On the wall facing the porch is a fireplace, surrounded by embossed glazed ceramic. The vaults are decorated with cherry tree and shell motifs, made of polychrome plaster. Similarly, on the doorposts between the dining room and the porch are paintings of natural motifs (flora and fauna) made by Francesc Torrescassana, such as sparrows, hummingbirds, herons, cranes and flamingos. All the birds are shown in flight, except the flamingos at the bottom, and the leaves sway in the wind. In all, there are twenty-four figures of birds. The dining room cabinets, designed by Gaudí, match the frames that contain Torrescassana’s paintings. The architect also designed the locks, all different, thus demonstrating his knowledge of various artistic skills. At the top two entrance doors to the dining room, there are two oriental-style terracotta figures, the work of Antoni Riba, one male and one female, probably an odalisque.

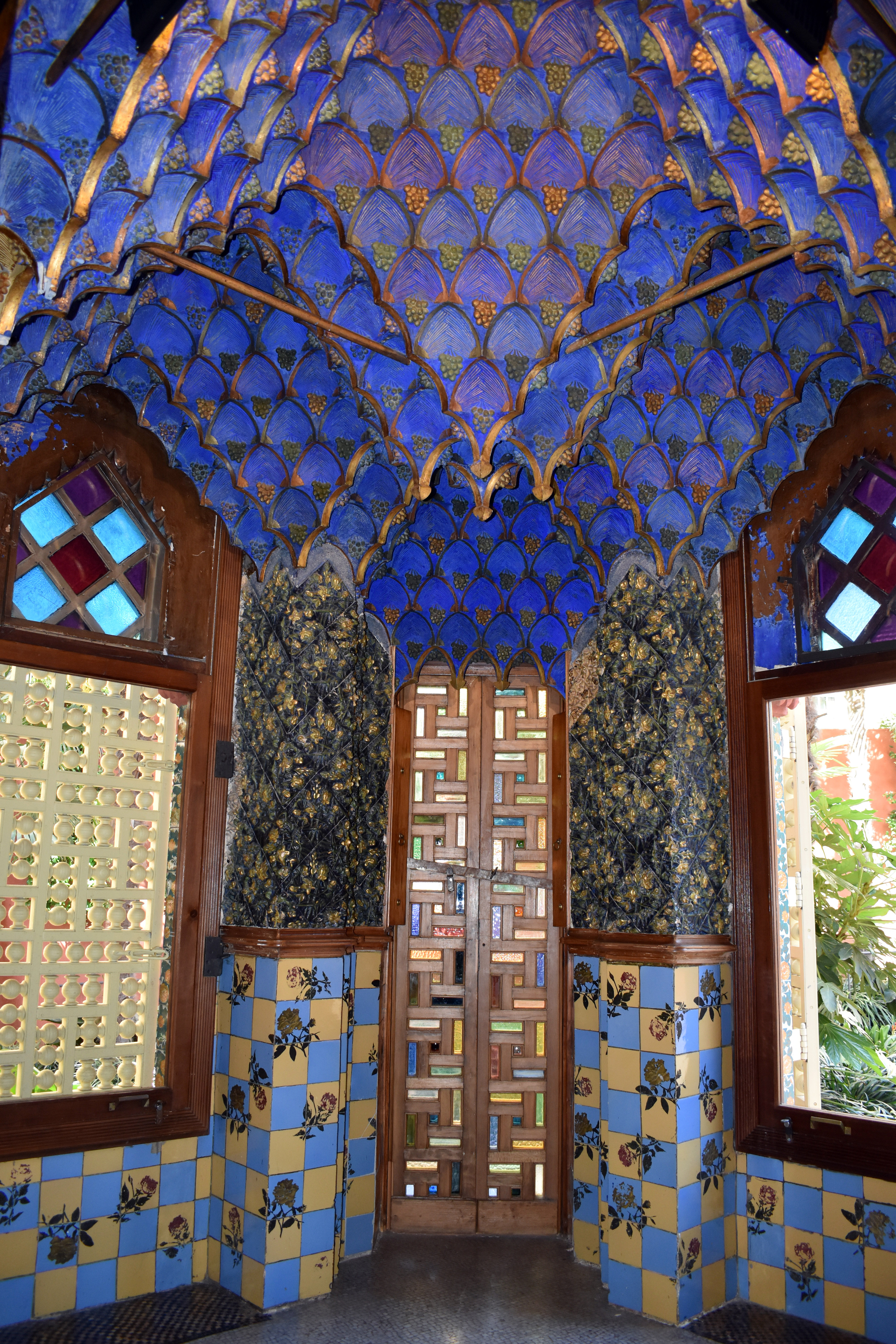
Smoking room

The dining room leads into the covered porch (13 m^{2}), open to the outside thanks to a system of oriental-inspired latticework. In the centre there is a fountain formed by a circular plateresque baptismal font, which contains a square podium with tiles of sunflower leaves. From there, a marble column emerges, topped with a circular cup, which has cherub heads at the bottom to drain the water and at the top is an elliptical metal mesh that resembles a spider’s web. On either side of this fountain there are wooden benches. The room is decorated with carnation tiles, while the ceiling is decorated with sgraffito, using pomegranate and hydrangea motifs and Trompe-l'œil tempera paintings depicting a sky seen through palm leaves. The separation between the two rooms was formerly made with sliding doors designed by Eudald Puntí.

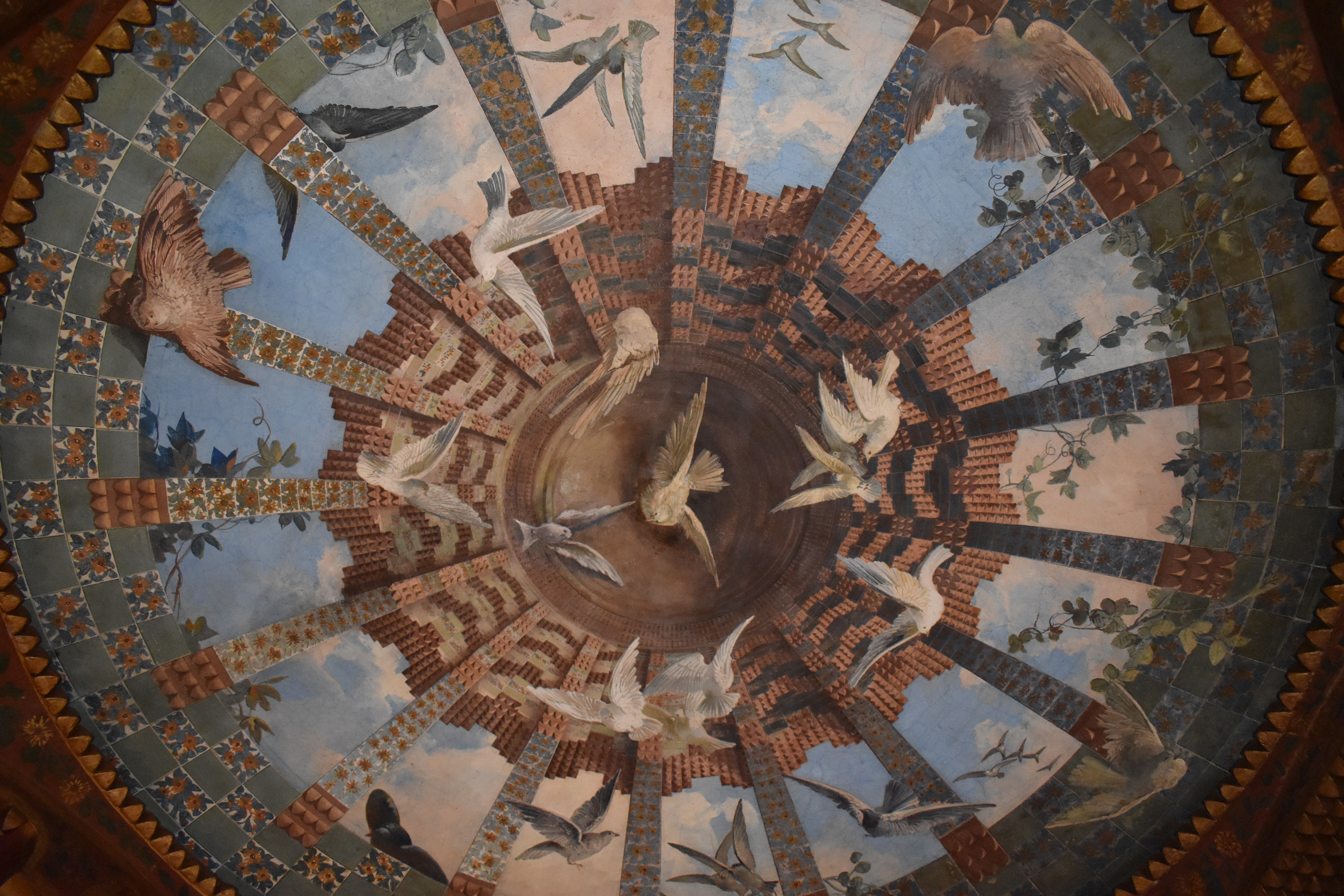
Living room dome

Next to the dining room is the smoking room (10 m^{2}), one of the most special rooms in the house, with a partitioned vault covered with a ceiling of Islamic style muqarnas in the shape of stalactites made of polychrome plaster, that show palm leaves and clusters of dates. The walls are lined with papier mâché tiles in shades of gold, blue, and green, as well as a blue and ochre-coloured wardrobe with oil-painted red and yellow roses. These papier mâché tiles were made by Hermenegild Miralles, one of Gaudí’s clients, for whom he built the entrance gateway to the Miralles estate. This room has a wooden door that gives access to the garden, made with a Chinese-style lattice. It was furnished with a folding coffee table and low stools and had a hookah for smoking tobacco. The Jover family added an Islamic style lamp, of translucent glass with Arabic letters, which was removed in 2020 during the restoration process, as it did not belong to Gaudí’s original project.

On the first floor (143 m^{2}) were the bedrooms: the main one was over the dining room, with a terrace located above the lower porch; it also had a living room, located above the smoking room, a bathroom, a dressing room with toilet and other facilities, a guest room and one other room, probably intended for study or as a library. These rooms were decorated with frescoes of plant motifs inspired by the plants of the nearby river Cassoles (reeds, rushes and ferns). The master bedroom (34 m^{2}) has a beamed ceiling with ceramic tiles and pressed papier mâché showing green vine motifs. It also has a terrace located above the covered porch on the lower floor, with a wooden bench with an iron grille. In the living room there is a dome decorated with a trompe-l'œil painting of baroque influence that reproduces in low angle the cupola of the pavilion that rises above this room, towards the sky, with a group of white doves in flight, as well as the branches of climbing plants along the rail. This room also has a floor covered with blue, white and ochre tiles. In the corner there is a balcony with wooden benches and an enclosure made of oriental latticework similar to those in the rest of the house. The dressing room (7 m^{2}) has two access doors and a white and blue check tile skirting surrounded by other tiles in ochre, with a beam ceiling with floral motifs and corbels decorated with daisies on a blue background. The bathroom (6 m^{2}) has a grey terrazzo floor and tiled walls, alternating ochre tones with white and blue check, as well as a tile frieze with oil-painted flowers, unique in the house. The bathroom ceiling is beamed, with ceramic reliefs of ivy leaves. The toilet (1.4 m^{2}) is decorated with tiles showing wheels and stars.

The second floor (150 m^{2}), intended for staff accommodation, is currently an exhibition space. Gaudí designed this floor in a more austere way, according to its functions, with smooth walls, tiled flooring and a wooden beamed ceiling. He designed an open space with high ceilings that would serve as the building’s thermal regulator.

The basement, which has Catalan vaults on the ceiling, was formerly used as a wine cellar and coal bunker. The museum store is currently located there.

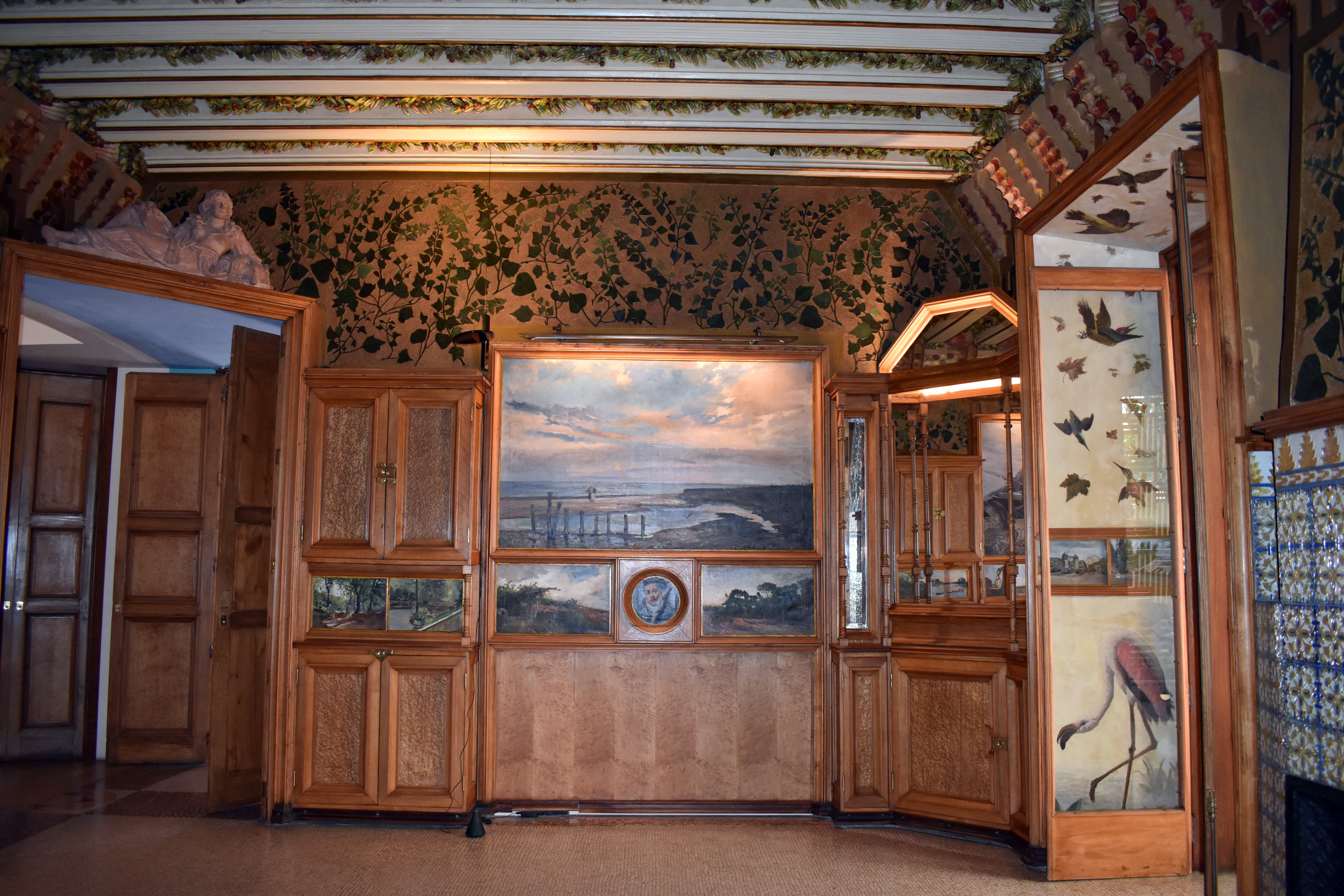
Dining room, southeast side

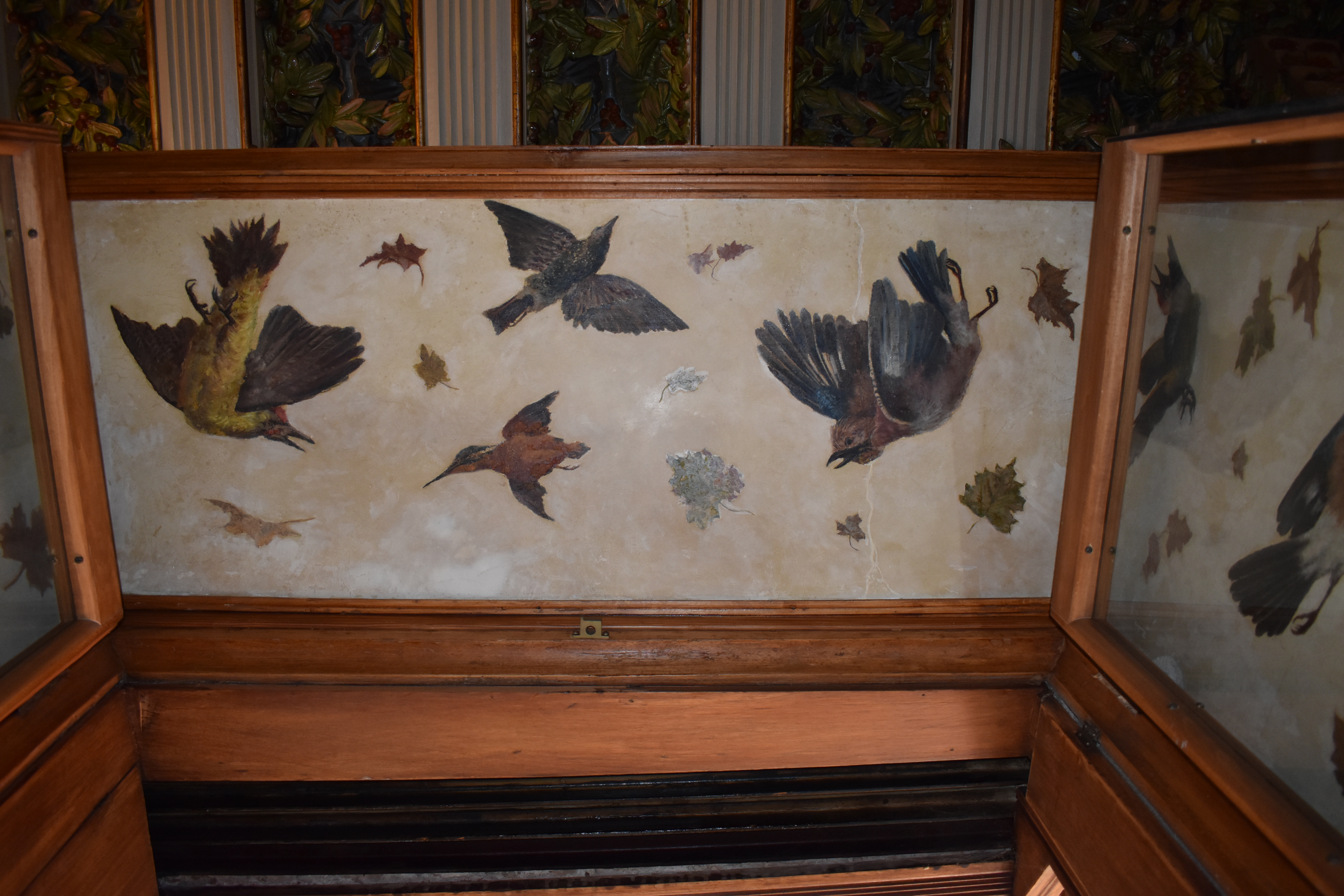
Bird paintings on the dining room jambs

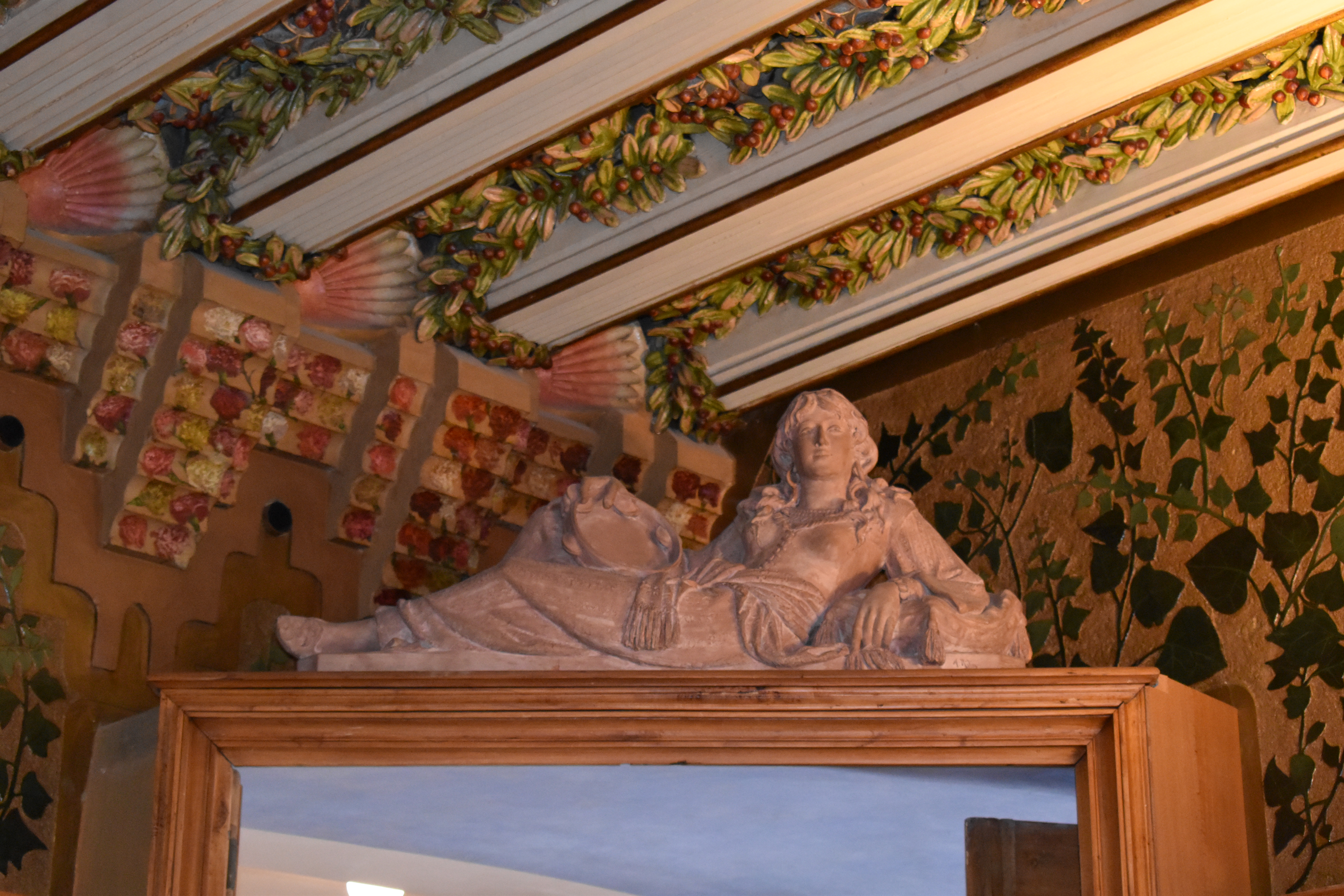
Odalisque figure, by Antoni Riba

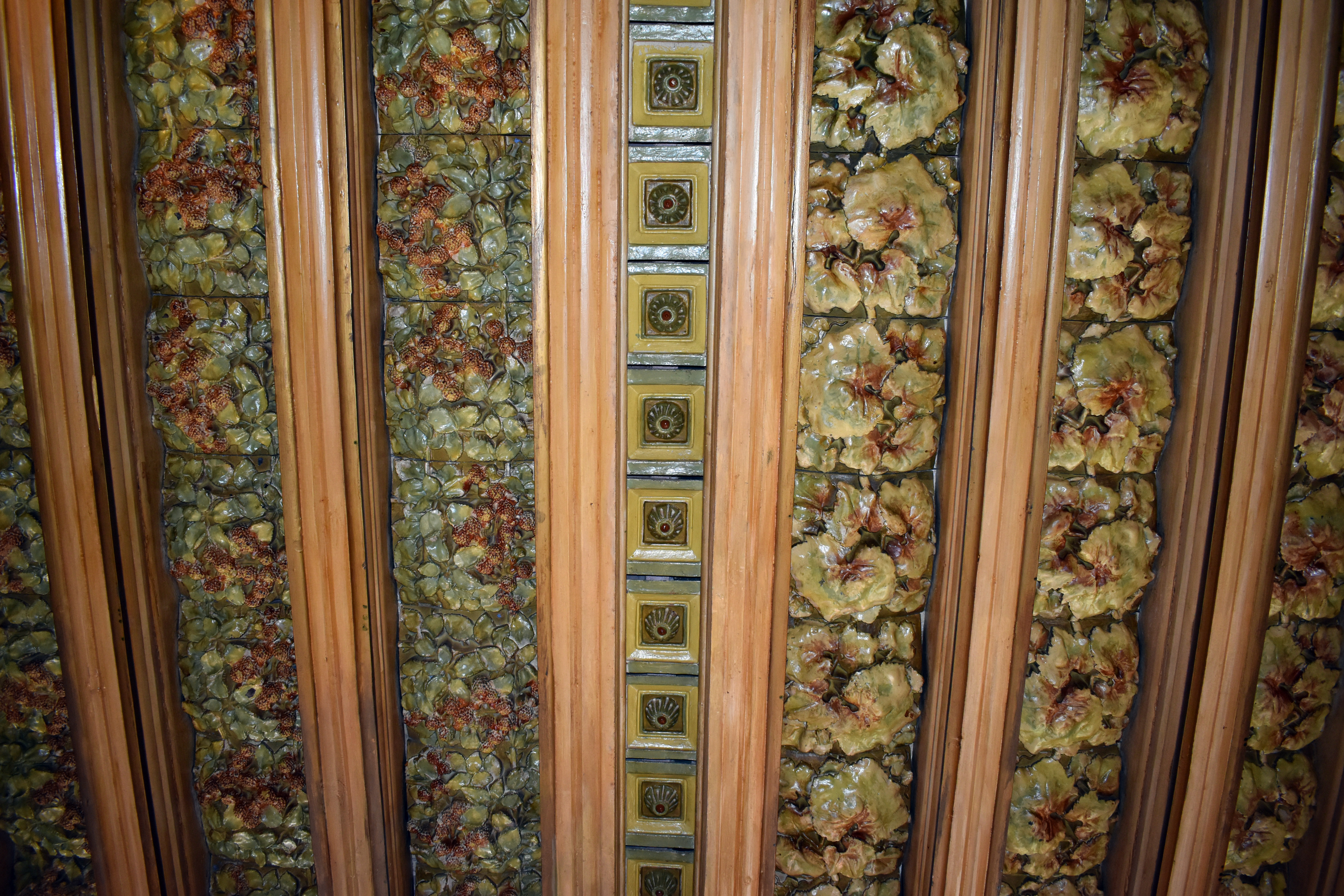
Bedroom ceiling

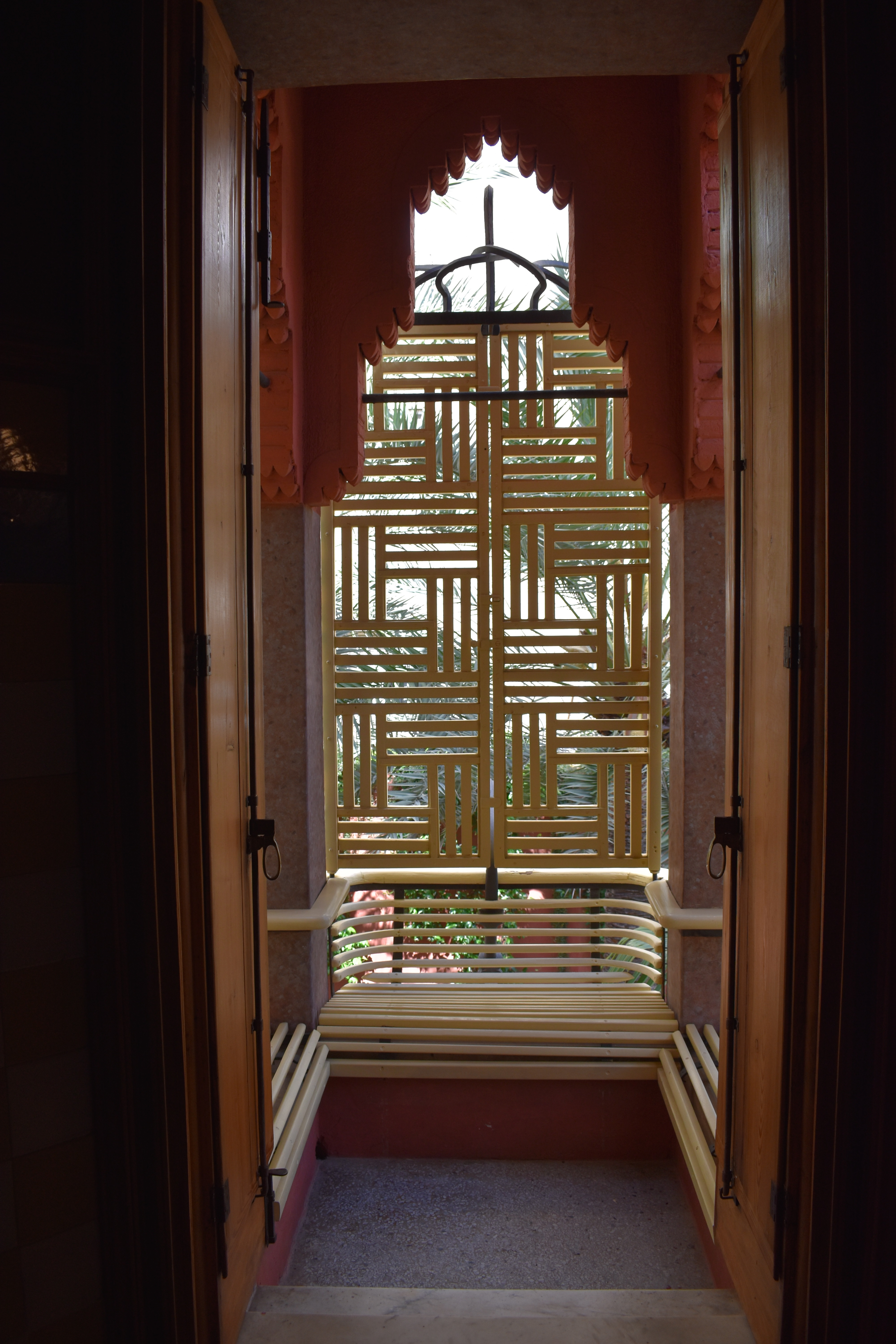
Living room balcony window

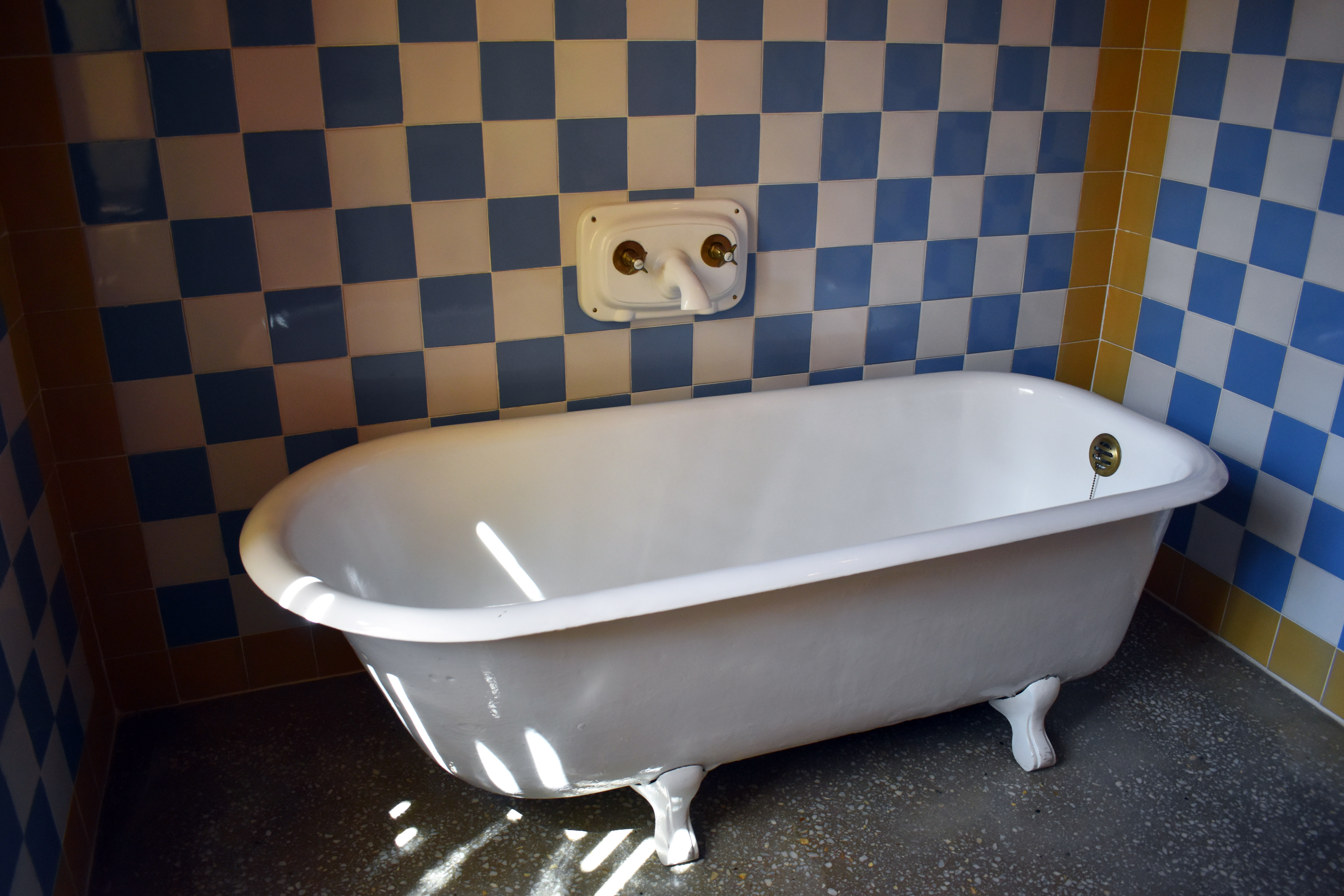
Bathroom

=== Paintings ===
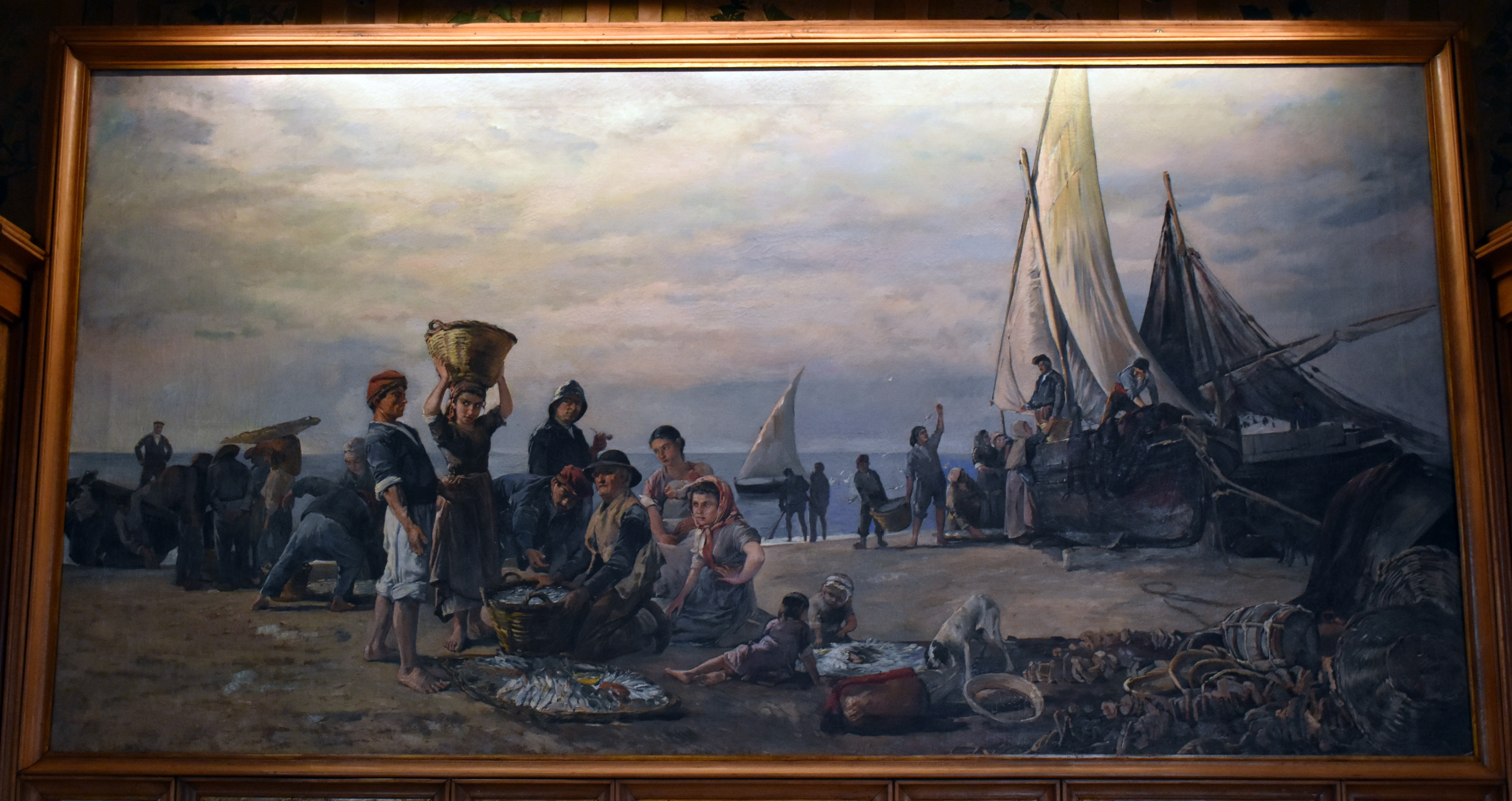
Customs scene

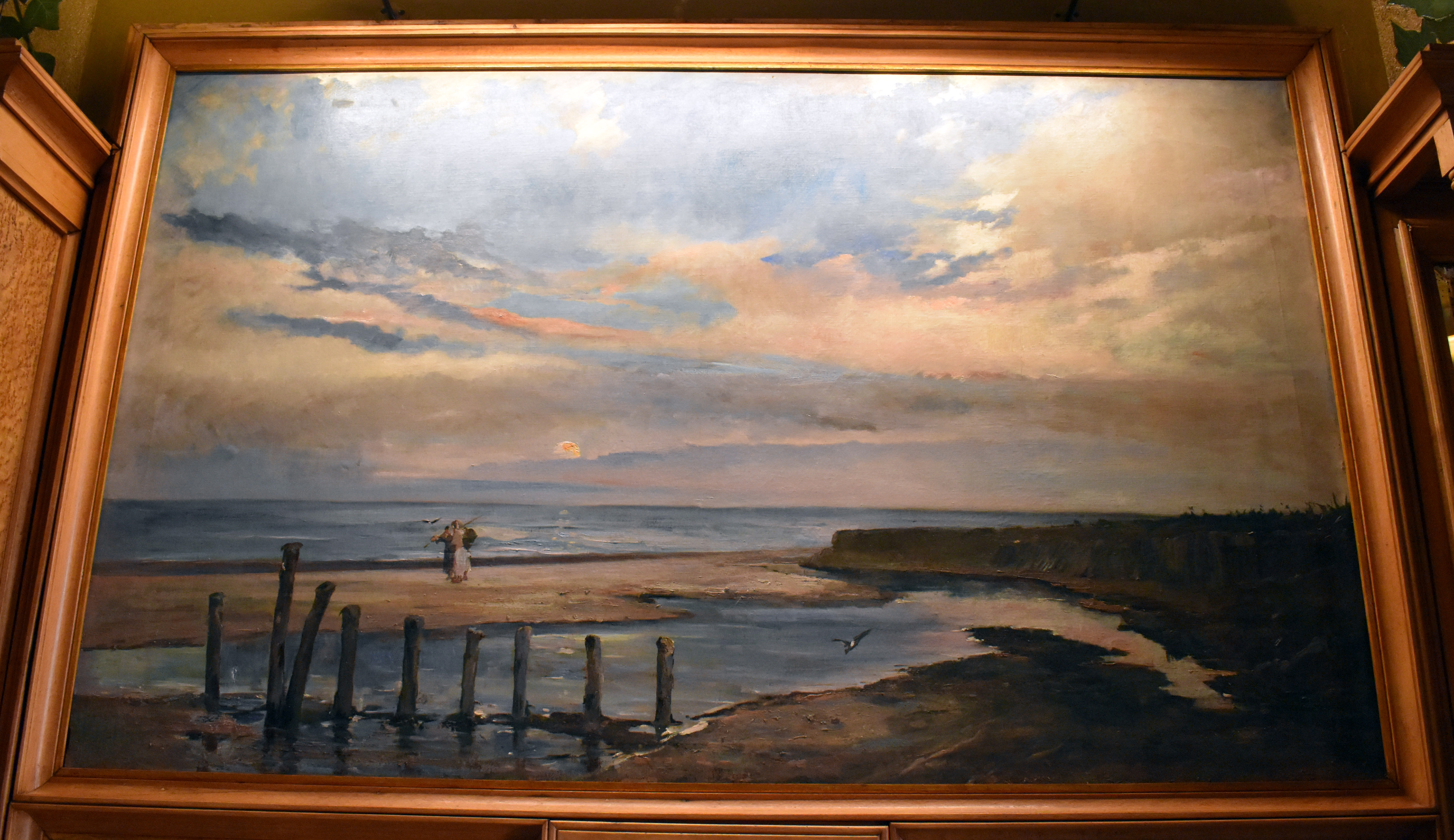
Marine

The paintings in the dining room are the work of Francesc Torrescassana i Sallarés (Barcelona, 1845-1918). He studied at the Llotja School in Barcelona from 1859 to 1865, where he was a protégé of Ramon Martí Alsina. He completed further studies in Rome and Paris, where he explored the artistic trends of his time. On his return, he focused principally on historical, costumbrista, portrait and landscape painting, in a realist style that in its final stages evolved into a certain degree of impressionism. He has works in the Museu Nacional d'Art de Catalunya (Barcelona), in the Museo del Prado in Madrid and in the Louvre Museum in Paris, although it is Casa Vicens that houses the greatest number of works by the artist.

The details of the commission are unknown, although it seems that Manuel Vicens was already a collector of Torrescassana’s work before the construction of the house. Therefore, it is assumed that a great deal of these works – many of which are not dated – were painted previously by artist and not made specifically for the house. To house this collection, Gaudí designed the furniture of the dining room according to how these paintings would be exhibited, so he made wooden framed furniture of lemon wood from Ceylon to integrate harmoniously with the collection on display. In total, the dining room contains thirty-two paintings, consisting of two portraits, two interiors and twenty-eight landscapes. They are works inherited from his initial realist style, influenced by Martí Alsina, but there is a certain evolution, conveying a somewhat romantic air, reminiscent of the work of Modest Urgell. Of the collection of works, only four are signed and dated, specifically in 1879, which indicates that they were created prior to the construction of the house; only one is signed. All the paintings are oil on canvas.

The paintings preserved in the dining room of Casa Vicens are (listed from top to bottom and from left to right):

- Southwest wall:
  - Landscape, c. 1870-1888
  - Landscape, c. 1870-1888
  - Landscape, c. 1870-1888
  - Landscape, c. 1870-1888
  - Landscape, c. 1870-1888
  - Landscape, c. 1870-1888
  - Roda de Ter, c. 1870-1888
  - Landscape, c. 1870-1888
- Northwest wall:
  - Marine, c. 1870-1888 (signed)
  - Village, c. 1870-1888
  - Male portrait, c. 1870-1888
  - Village, c. 1870-1888
  - Barn, c. 1870-1888
  - Marine, 187(4?) (signed and dated, difficult to read)
- Northeast wall:
  - Customs scene, c. 1870-1888
  - Marine, c. 1870-1888
  - Marine, c. 1870-1888
  - Street of a village, c. 1870-1888
  - View of a village, 1879 (signed and dated)
  - Trees, c. 1870-1888
  - Interior, 1879 (signed and dated)
  - Trees, c. 1870- 1888
  - Landscape, 1879 (signed and dated)
  - Street of a village, c. 1870- 1888
  - Landscape, c. 1870-1888
  - Landscape, c. 1870-1888
- Southeast wall:
  - Marine, c. 1870-1888
  - Landscape, c. 1870-1888
  - Garden, c. 1870-1888
  - Landscape, c. 1870-1888
  - Unknown portrait, c. 1870-1888
  - Landscape, c. 1870-1888

== See also ==
- List of Gaudí buildings
- List of Modernisme buildings in Barcelona

== Bibliography ==
- Antoni Gaudí (1852-1926). Barcelona: Fundació Caixa de Pensions. 1986. ISBN 84-7664-031-5.
- Bassegoda Nonell, Juan (1989). El gran Gaudí (in Spanish). Sabadell: Ausa. ISBN 978-84-86329-44-0.
- Bassegoda Nonell, Juan (1984). Gaudí. Arquitectura del futuro (in Spanish). Barcelona: Salvat Editores. ISBN 84-345-4486-5.
- Bassegoda Nonell, Juan (2002). Gaudí o espacio, luz y equilibrio (in Spanish). Madrid: Criterio Libros. ISBN 84-95437-10-4.
- Bergós Massó, Juan (1974). Gaudí, el hombre y la obra (in Spanish). Barcelona: Universidad Politécnica de Barcelona. ISBN 84-600-6248-1.
- Caruncho, Daniel R. (2019). Casa Vicens (in Spanish). Barcelona: Dosde. ISBN 978-84-9103-175-8.
- Crippa, Maria Antonietta (2006). Gaudí (in Spanish). Cologne, Germany: Taschen GmbH. ISBN 978-3-8228-2519-8.
- Enciclopèdia de Barcelona 3. Gràcia / Petritxol (in Catalan). Barcelona: Gran Enciclopèdia Catalana. 2006. ISBN 84-412-1397-6.
- Estévez, Alberto T. (2011). Arquitectura de Gaudí (in Spanish). Madrid: Tikal. ISBN 978-84-9928-106-3.
- Giralt-Miracle, Daniel (2012). Gaudí esencial (in Spanish). Barcelona: La Vanguardia Ediciones S.L. ISBN 978-84-96642-73-7.
- Gueilburt, Luis (2003). Gaudí i el Registre de la Propietat (in Catalan). Institut Gaudí de la Construcció. ISBN 84-688-1124-6.
- Gueilburt, Luis; García Vergara, Marisa (2006). Gaudí. Obradores (in Spanish). Caixa Catalunya, Centro de Artesanía y Diseño Centrad, Instituto Lucense de Desarrollo Económico y Social, Diputación Provincial de Lugo. ISBN 84-8192-332-X.
- Ràfols, Josep Francesc; Folguera, Francesc (2011). Gaudí 1928 (in Catalan). Barcelona: Edicions UPC. ISBN 978-84-7653-601-8.
- Regàs, Ricard (2009). Obra completa de Antoni Gaudí (in Spanish). Dos de Arte Ediciones. ISBN 978-84-608-5349-7.
- Tarragona i Clarasó, Josep Maria (2016). Gaudí, el arquitecto de la Sagrada Familia (in Spanish). Barcelona: Torsimany. ISBN 978-84-96783-42-3.
- Van Hensbergen, Gijs (2002). Antoni Gaudí (in Spanish). Barcelona: Penguin Random House. ISBN 978-84-663-3601-7.
