= List of octagonal buildings and structures in the United States =

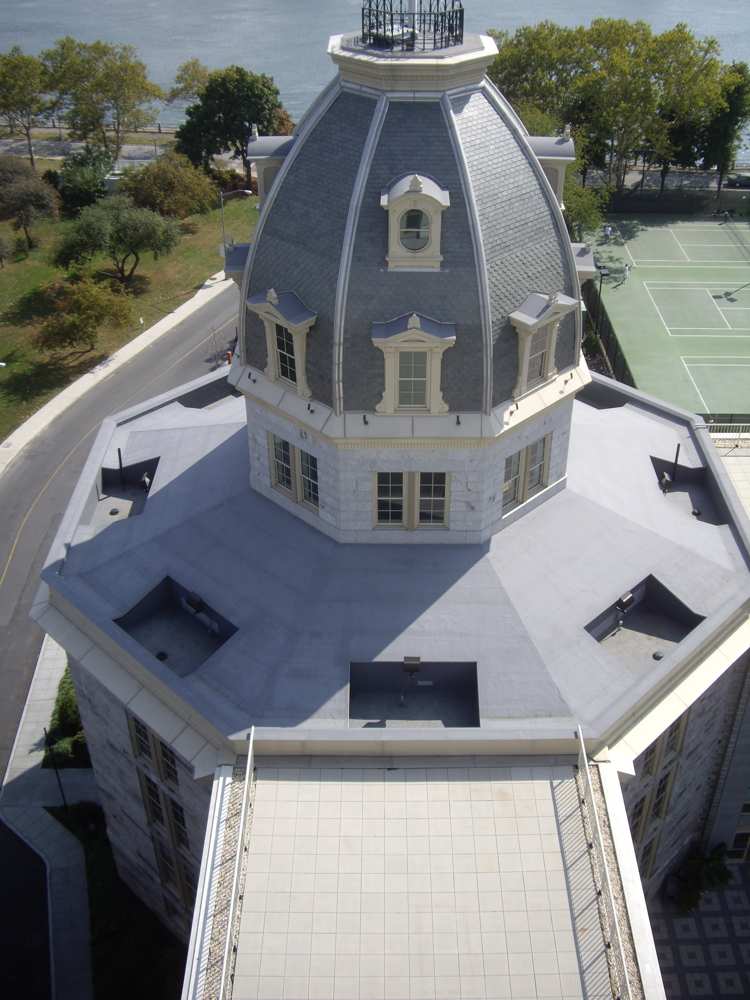
The Octagon (Roosevelt Island, New York), once an insane asylum

Octagonal buildings and structures are characterized by an octagonal plan form, whether a perfect geometric octagon or a regular eight-sided polygon with approximately equal sides. Octagon-shaped buildings date from at least 300 B.C. when the Tower of the Winds in Athens, Greece, was constructed. Octagonal houses were popularized in the United States in the mid-19th century by Orson Squire Fowler and many other octagonal buildings and structures soon followed.

Octagonal buildings and structures in the United States, not including octagonal houses (which are covered at List of octagon houses) include the following. Many of these are on the National Register of Historic Places.

== Barber shops ==
- Dickey's Octagonal Barbershop, Rives, Tennessee

== Churches, chapels, mosques, synagogues, etc. ==
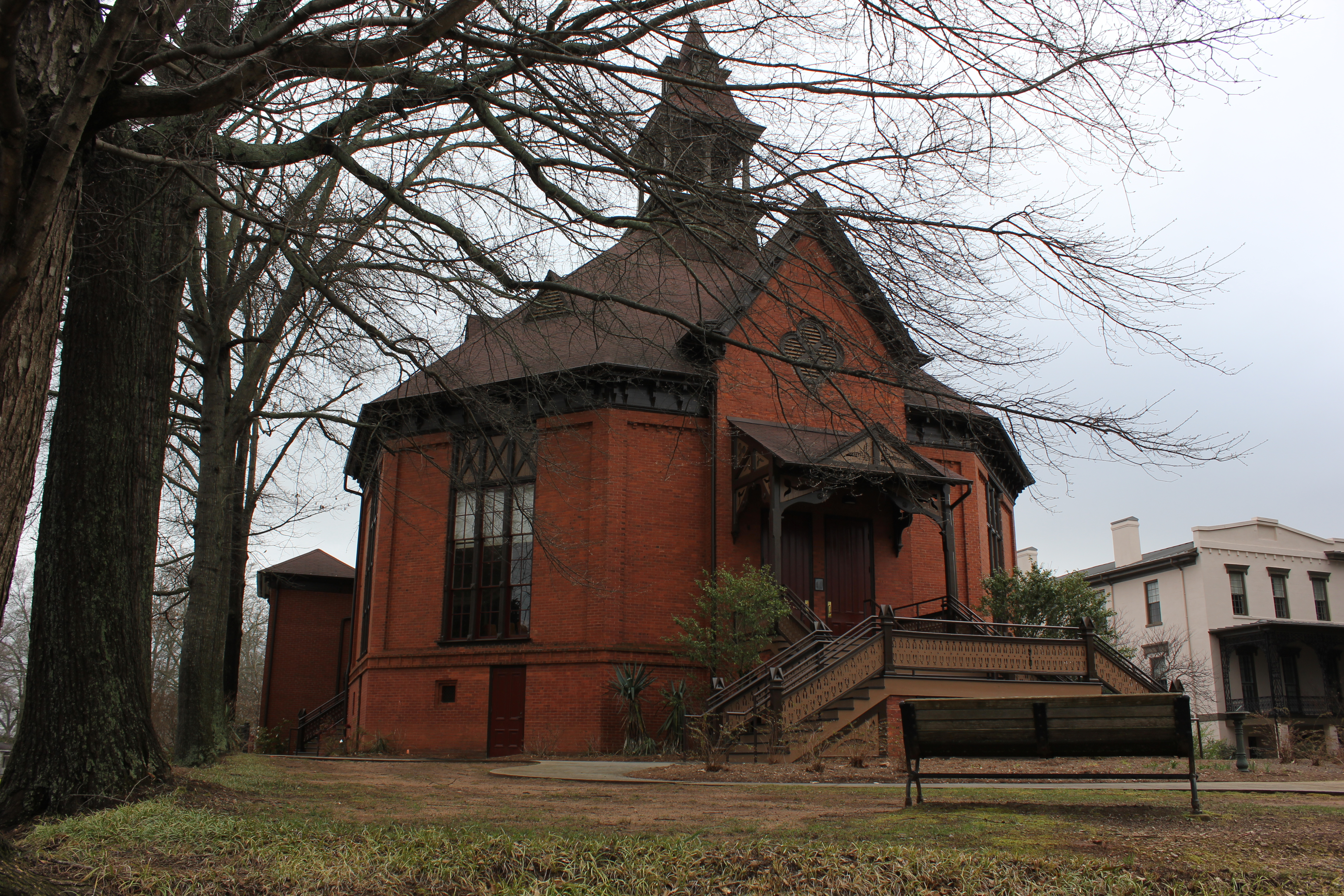
Seney–Stovall Chapel, Athens, Georgia

- Alberts Chapel, Sand Ridge, West Virginia
- Falcon Tabernacle, Falcon, North Carolina
- First Congregational Church, U.C.C., Naponee, Nebraska
- Follen Church Society-Unitarian Universalist, Lexington, Massachusetts
- Holy Ghost Catholic Church, Kula, Hawaii
- McBee Methodist Church, Conestee, South Carolina
- Mercy Chapel at Mill Run, Selbysport, Maryland
- Seney–Stovall Chapel, Athens, Georgia
- Conference Point Chapel Williams Bay, Wisconsin
- Seventh Church of Christ, Scientist (Seattle, Washington), an irregular octagon
- St. Clare's Church (Staten Island, New York), an irregular octagon
- The Temple (Old Orchard Beach, Maine)
- Third Church of Christ, Scientist (Washington, D.C.) (demolished)
- Union Chapel (Oak Bluffs, Massachusetts)
- Cottage Grove Museum (Cottage Grove, Oregon) (formerly St. Mary's Catholic Church)
- The Circassian Benevolent Association (CBA, The Circassian Mosque) Wayne, New Jersey
- Calvary Temple Assembly of God (Evansville, Indiana)
- The Cathedral (Evansville, Indiana)

== Farm buildings including barns ==
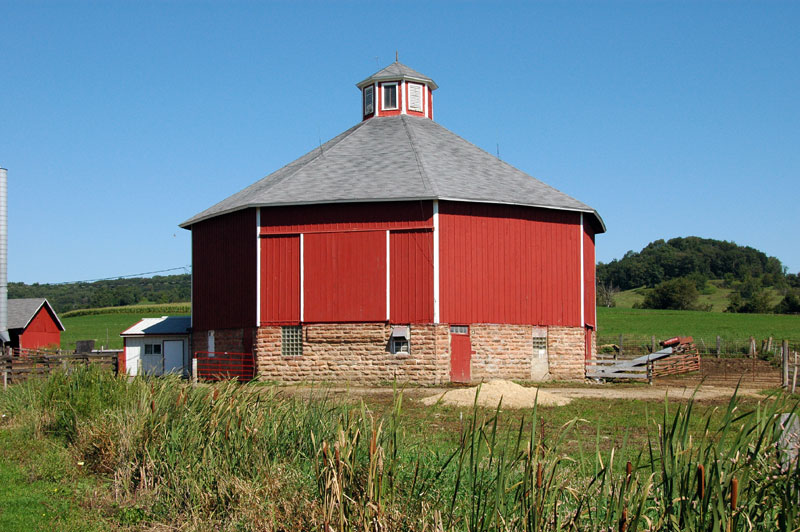
Octagonal barn in Plain, Wisconsin

- Fobes Octagon Barn, Lanesboro, Iowa
- Kinney Octagon Barn, Burr Oak, Iowa
- Octagon Barn (Jamaica, Iowa)
- Bird Octagonal Mule Barn, Shelby County, Kentucky
- Octagonal Poultry House, Cold Spring, New Jersey
- Roberts Octagon Barn, Sharon Center, Iowa
- Secrest Octagon Barn, Downey, Iowa
- Tim Thering Octagon Barn (Plain, Wisconsin)

== Forts ==
- Fort Edgecomb, Maine

== Government buildings ==
- Navajo Nation Council Chamber, a National Historic Landmark, Window Rock, Arizona
- Octagon Building (Santa Cruz, California)

== Halls ==
- Franklin County G. A. R. Soldiers' Memorial Hall, Hampton, Iowa
- Octagon Hall Museum, Franklin, Kentucky - built by Andrew Jackson Caldwell (NRHP)
- Chautauqua Auditorium, Waxahachie, Texas

== High rises ==
- Tower Life Building, San Antonio, Texas
- Octagon Towers Condominium, Miami Beach, Florida

== Hospitals and insane asylums ==
- The Octagon (Roosevelt Island, New York)

== Hotels ==
- Brightwood Beach Cottage, Litchfield, Minnesota
- Octagon Hotel, Oyster Bay, New York

== Jails ==
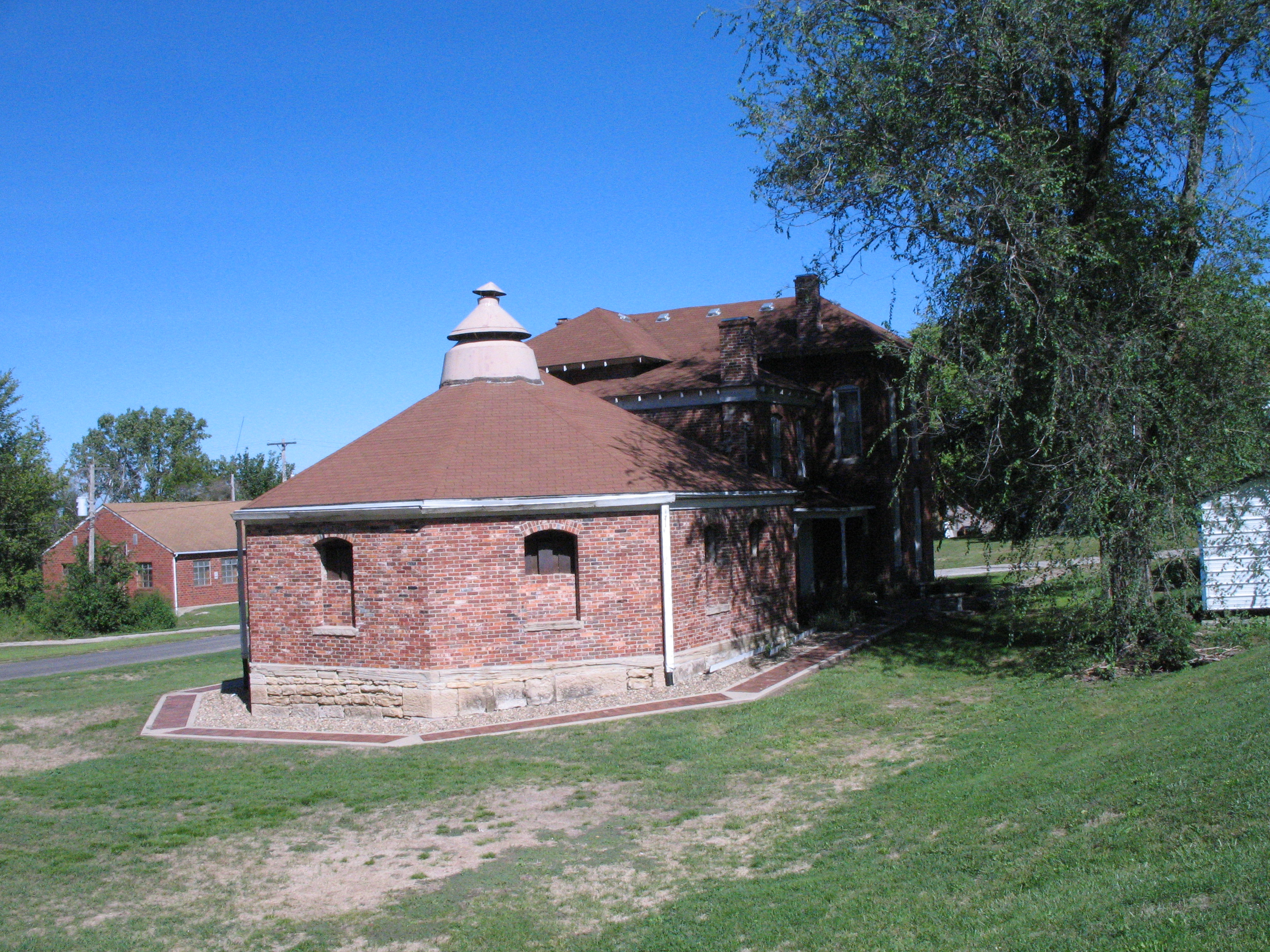
Daviess County Rotary Jail

- Daviess County Rotary Jail and Sheriff's Residence, Gallatin, Missouri

== Libraries ==
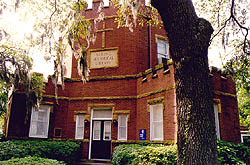
Waring Library

- Andover Public Library (Andover, Maine)
- Atlanta Public Library, Atlanta, Illinois
- Goodnow Library, Sudbury, Massachusetts
- Waring Library, on the former campus of Porter Military Academy, Charleston, South Carolina
- Red Hook Public Library, (Red Hook, New York)
- Ram Dass Library, Omega Institute (Rhinebeck, New York)

== Lighthouses ==
- Eldred Rock Light, Alaska
- Cape Henry Light, Virginia
- Point Judith Light, Rhode Island
- Portland Observatory, Maine
- Blackwell Island Lighthouse, New York
- Harbour Town Light, South Carolina

== Markets ==
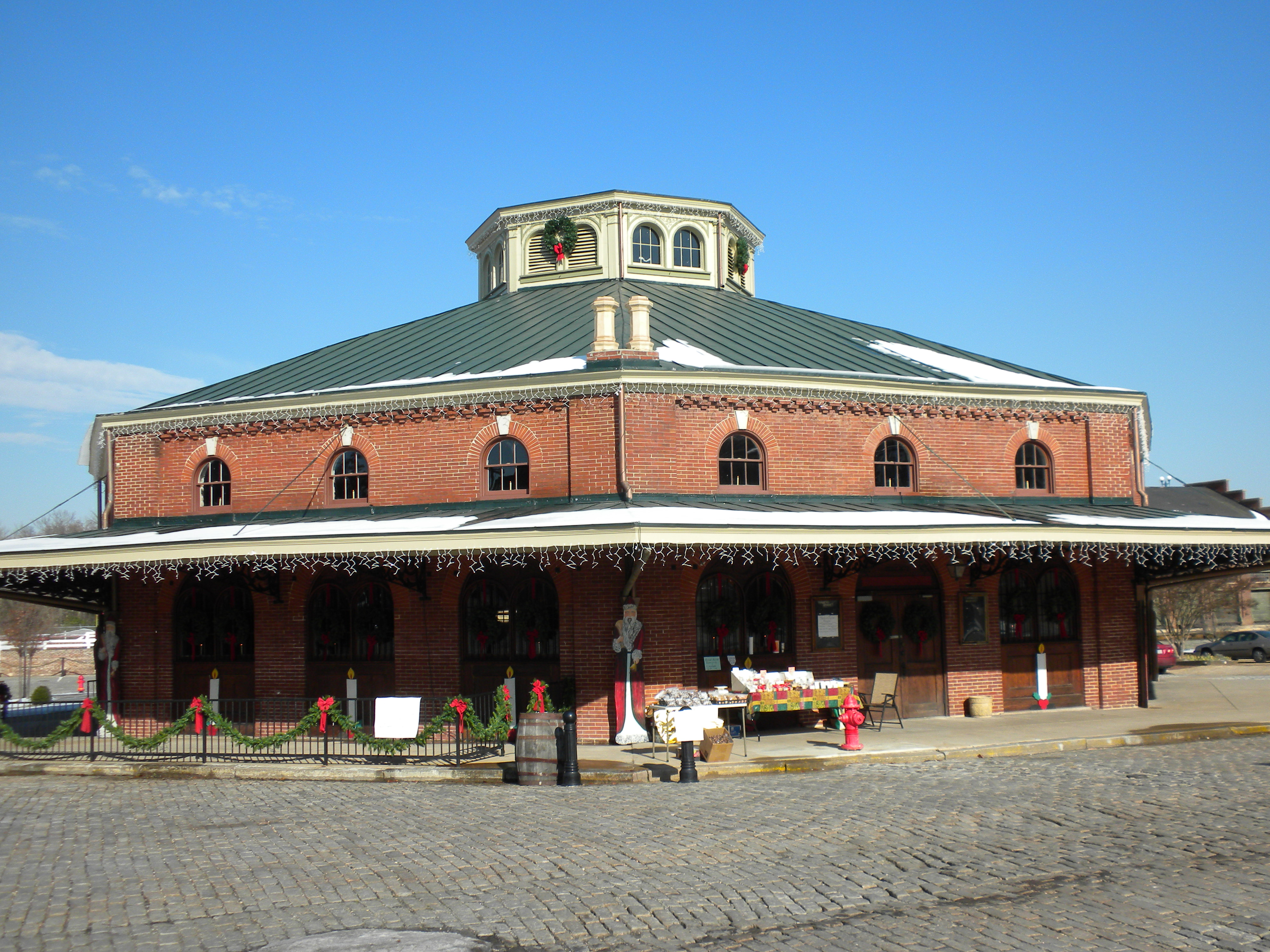
City Market in Petersburg, Virginia

- City Market (Petersburg, Virginia)

== Park and fair buildings ==
- Floral Hall, Lexington, Kentucky
- Highland Park Dentzel Carousel and Shelter Building, Meridian, Mississippi
- Butte–Lawrence County Fairgrounds, Nisland, South Dakota

== Post offices ==
- Old Post Office (Liberty, Maine)

== Schools and colleges ==
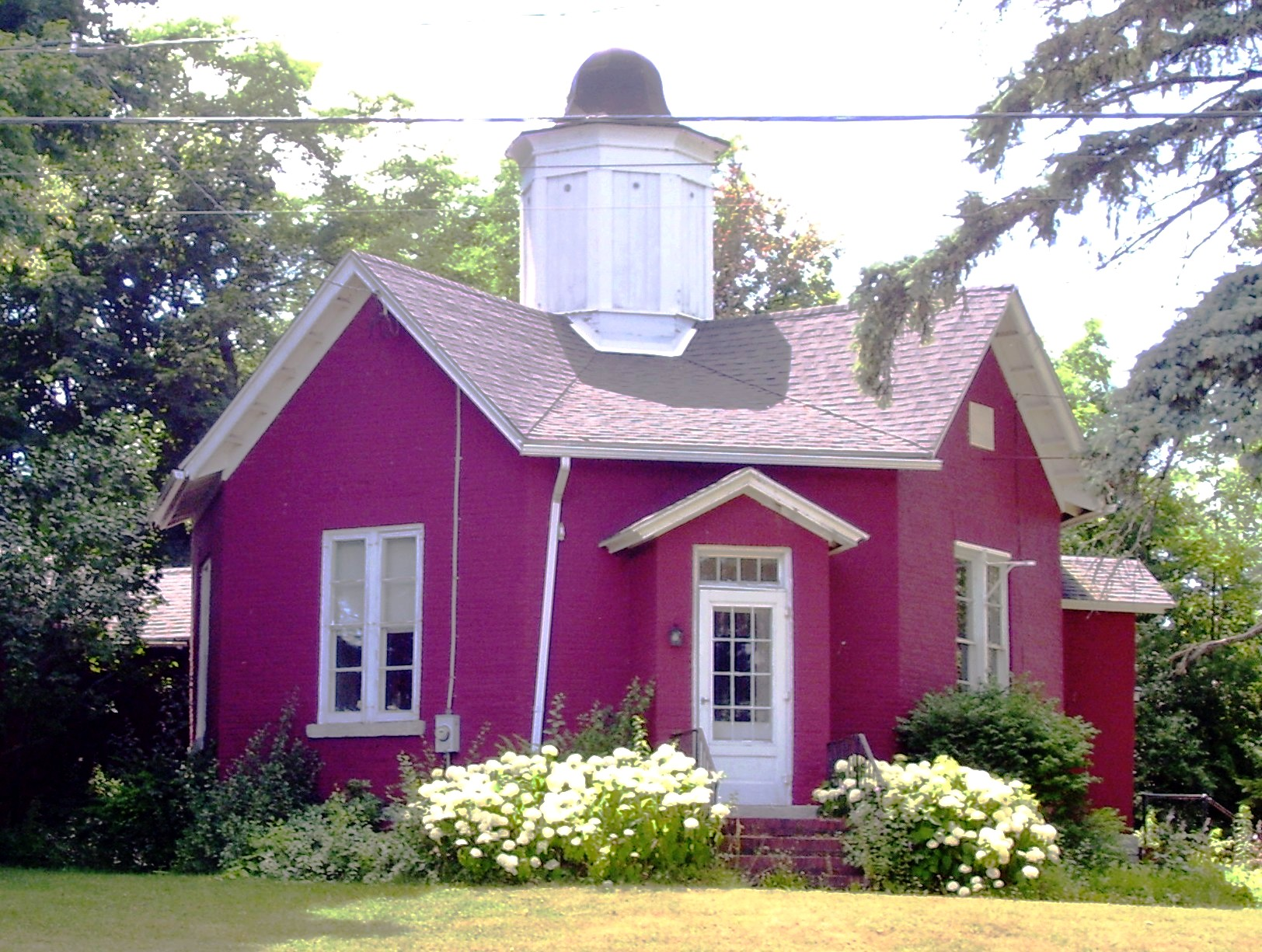
The former schoolhouse built in 1859 in Skaneateles, New York is now a private residence

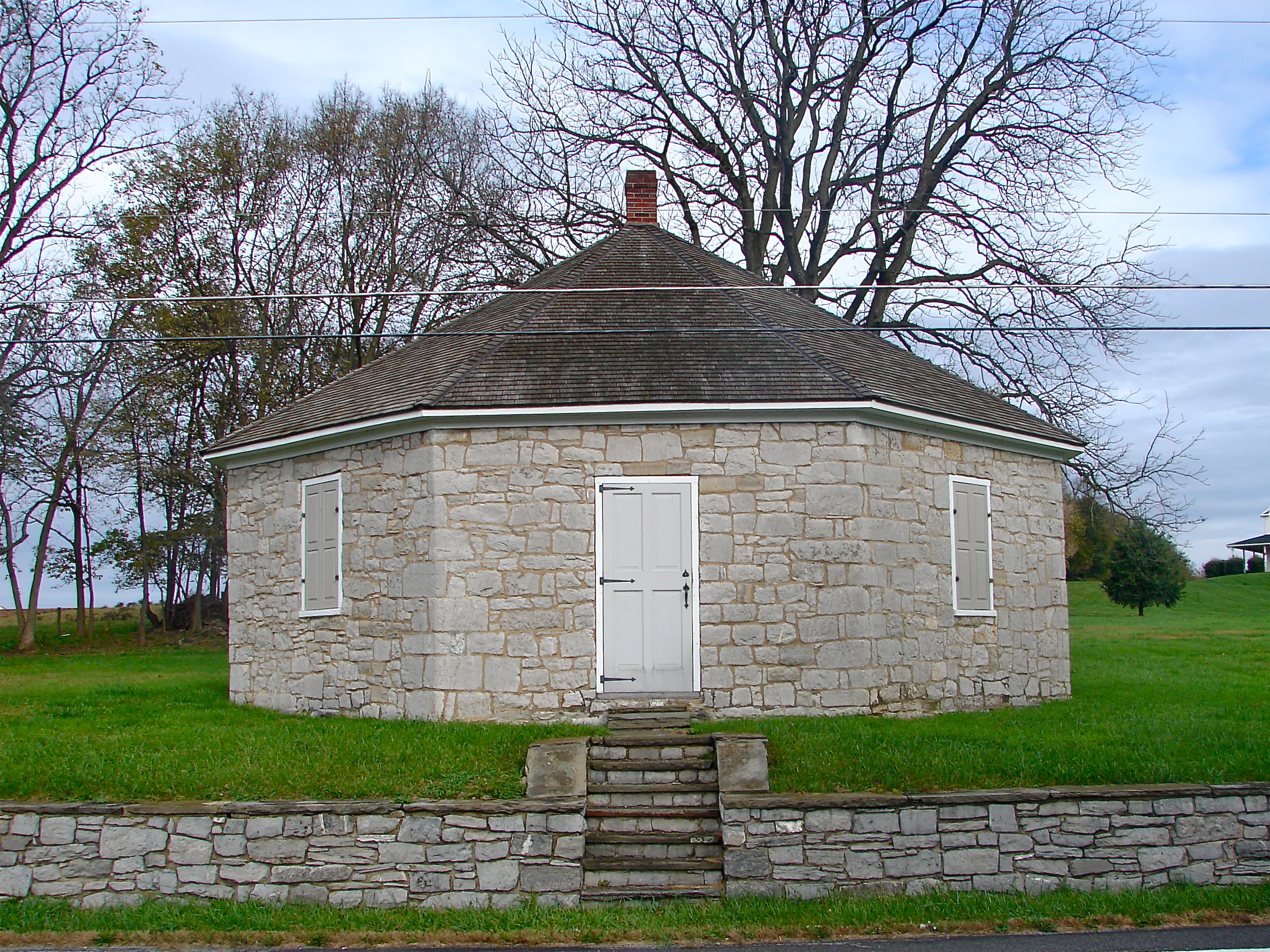
Sodom Schoolhouse

- Birmingham Friends Meetinghouse and Octagonal School (1819), Birmingham Township, Pennsylvania
- Mount Washington Octagon (c.1855), Baltimore, Maryland, built for the Mt. Washington Female Academy, later used home of Mount St. Agnes College, a Baltimore City Landmark
- The "Bee Hive", a former schoolhouse built by Quakers in 1859 in Skaneateles, New York
- Charter Oak Schoolhouse (1873), Schuline, Illinois
- Diamond Rock Schoolhouse (1818), Tredyffrin Township, Chester County, Pennsylvania
- District No. 13 School (1898), Ortonville, Minnesota, NRHP-listed in Big Stone County
- District No. 92 School (1906), Jackson, Minnesota, NRHP-listed in Jackson County
- Florence Corners School, Florence, Ohio
- Cowles Hall, Elmira College, Elmira, New York
- Hood Octagonal School, Newtown Township (Delaware Co.), Pennsylvania
- Modern Times School, Brentwood, New York
- Malmborg School, Bozeman, Montana
- Octagonal Schoolhouse (Cowgill's Corner, Delaware)
- Octagonal Schoolhouse (Essex, New York)
- Octagon Stone Schoolhouse, South Canaan, Pennsylvania
- Sheldon Jackson School, Sitka, Alaska
- Sodom Schoolhouse, Montandon, Pennsylvania
- Wrightstown Octagonal Schoolhouse, Wrightstown, Pennsylvania
- Fairview Schoolhouse (1835), Knowlton Township, New Jersey
- Former schoolhouse, later home of Egg Harbor Historical Society, 533 London Ave., Egg Harbor City, New Jersey. at 39.536513°N 74.642807°W
- The Octagon Building (1890), Lily Dale, New York - originally used for dance and art classes and lectures

== Stores ==
- Andrew Gildersleeve Octagonal Building, Mattituck, New York, combination residence and store

== See also ==
- List of octagonal buildings and structures
- Octagon barn (disambiguation)
- Octagon Building (disambiguation)
- Octagon House (disambiguation)
- Octagonal Schoolhouse (disambiguation)
