= Octagon barn =

An octagon barn is a barn built in an octagonal shape, see Round barn § Octagonal.

As a proper name, Octagon Barn or Octagonal Barn may refer to:

== United States ==
- San Luis Obispo Octagon Barn, San Luis Obispo, California
- Kinney Octagon Barn, Burr Oak, Iowa, listed on the U.S. NRHP
- Secrest Octagon Barn, Downey, Iowa, NRHP
- Fobes Octagon Barn, Lanesboro, Iowa, NRHP
- Octagon Barn, Otter Township, Milo, Iowa, NRHP
- Octagon Barn (Polk Township, Iowa),
- Octagon Barn, Richland Township, Iowa, NRHP
- Roberts Octagon Barn, Sharon Center, Iowa, NRHP
- Grimes Octagon Barn, West Union, Iowa, NRHP
- Thumb Octagon Barn, Gagetown, Michigan
- Marsh Octagon Barn, NHRP in Wright County, Minnesota
- J. F. Roberts Octagonal Barn, Rea, Missouri, NRHP
- Octagonal Poultry House, Cold Spring, New Jersey, NRHP
- Lattin-Crandall Octagon Barn, Catherine, New York, NRHP
- Lunn-Musser Octagon Barn, Garrattsville, New York, NRHP
- Mexico Octagon Barn, Mexico, New York, NRHP
- Baker Octagon Barn, Richfield Springs, New York, NRHP
- Rodman Octagonal Barn, Edgeley, North Dakota, NRHP
- Gerhardt Octagonal Pig House, Gladstone, North Dakota, NRHP
- Sylvanus Marriage Octagonal Barn, New Rockford, North Dakota, NRHP
- James Wimer Octagonal Barn, Lookingglass, Oregon, NRHP
- Harnsberger Octagonal Barn, Grottoes, Virginia, NRHP
- Rankin Octagonal Barn, Silverton, West Virginia, NRHP
- Tim Thering Octagon Barn, Plain, Wisconsin

== See also ==
- List of octagonal buildings and structures in the United States
- Octagon Building (disambiguation)
- Octagon House (disambiguation)
- Polygonal Barn (disambiguation)
