= Octagonal Schoolhouse =

Octagonal Schoolhouse, Octagonal School or Octagon School, etc., may refer to:

- Sheldon Jackson School, Sitka, Alaska, a property listed on the NRHP
- Octagonal Schoolhouse (Cowgill's Corner, Delaware), a property listed on the NRHP
- Charter Oak Schoolhouse, Schuline, Illinois, a property listed on the NRHP
- Octagonal School, in Watkins Woolen Mill State Park and State Historic Site, Lawson, Missouri, a property listed on the NRHP
- Modern Times School, Brentwood, New York, a property listed on the NRHP
- Octagonal Schoolhouse (Essex, New York), a property listed on the NRHP
- Dryden District School No. 5, Dryden, New York, a property listed on the NRHP
- Birmingham Friends Octagonal School, Birmingham Township, Chester County, Pennsylvania, a property listed on the NRHP
- Sodom Schoolhouse, Montandon, Pennsylvania, a property listed on the NRHP
- Hood Octagonal School, Newtown Township, Pennsylvania, a property listed on the NRHP
- Octagon Stone Schoolhouse, South Canaan, Pennsylvania, a property listed on the NRHP
- Wrightstown Octagonal Schoolhouse, Wrightstown, Pennsylvania, a property listed on the NRHP

== See also ==
- List of octagonal buildings and structures in the United States
