= Octagon House =

Octagon House may refer to:

- Octagon house, a historical American house type built on an octagonal plan
- Octagon House (novel), a 1937 mystery by Phoebe Atwood Taylor
- The Octagon House, Washington, D.C.
- See List of octagon houses for individual examples

== See also ==
- The Octagon (disambiguation)
- Octagon Barn (disambiguation)
- Octagon Building (disambiguation)
- Octagonal Schoolhouse (disambiguation)
