= Malmborg School =

- U.S. National Register of Historic Places
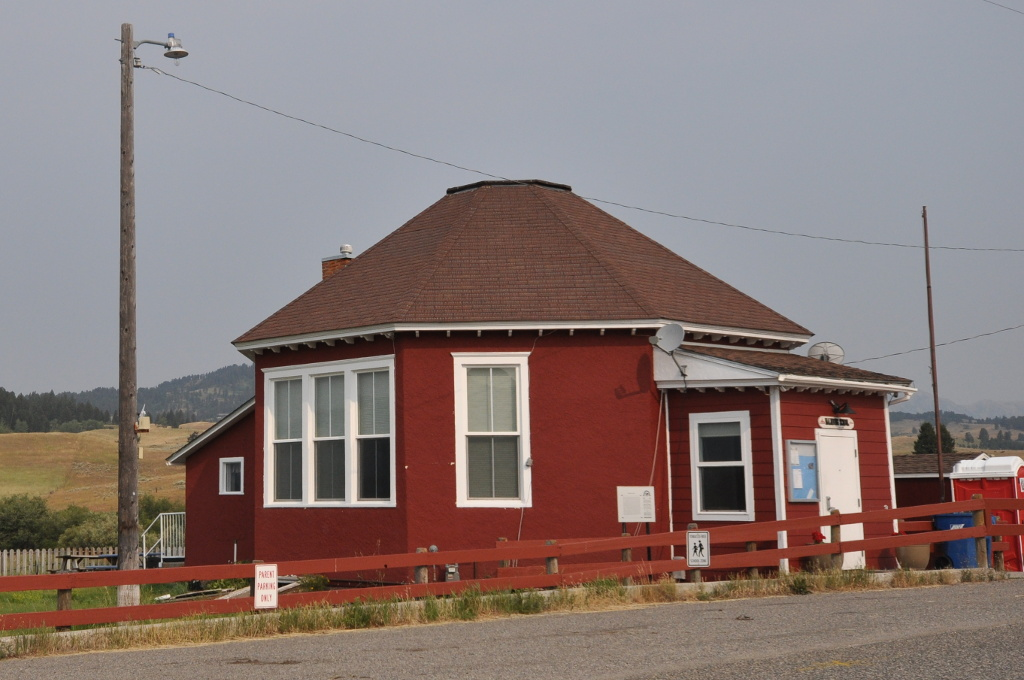
- Malmborg School in Bozeman, MT

- Location within Montana Location within the United States
- Location: East of Bozeman, Montana
- Coordinates: 45.672222°N 110.835°W
- Area: less than one acre
- Built: 1905
- MPS: One Room Schoolhouses of Gallatin County TR
- NRHP reference No.: 81000349
- Added to NRHP: July 21, 1981

The Malmborg School in Bozeman, Montana is a one-room schoolhouse and the only octagonal school in Montana. Built in 1905, the schoolhouse is an example of the octagonal schools commonly found in the Mid-Atlantic and associated with mid-nineteenth-century reformer Orson Fowler's promotion of the “Octagon Mode of Building” in his book, A Home for All. The octagonal design of the school allowed for greater interior area and increased natural lighting, with windows present on three of the school's walls. The original school also featured an open front porch and an open bell tower, which were enclosed and removed in later renovations. The Malmborg School survived the consolidation of school districts and subsequent decline of one-room schoolhouses beginning in the 1920s and is still operational today as a K-8 school, with 12 students and 1 teacher in the 2019–2020 school year. The school was listed on the National Register of Historic Places on July 21, 1981. It was one of thirteen one-room schoolhouses listed together on the register on this date in Gallatin County, Montana. Three additional one-room schoolhouses in Gallatin County were listed on the register later.

== Inscription on the National Register of Historic Places ==
As one of the first extensively settled agricultural areas in Montana, organized schools were established in Gallatin County soon after its settlement in the late 1860s. The establishment of a school district required the petitioning of the School Board of Montana by four residents of the community for financial support in building and staffing the school. Due to a lack of roads and fast transportation, these schools were usually one-room schoolhouses and were often located within five miles of each other. The Malmborg School was one such school and was unique due to its octagonal design. Surviving one-room schoolhouses in Gallatin County were deemed historically significant "on the basis of their historic association with the settlement of the small mining and agricultural communities in Gallatin County and because they demonstrate the architectural evolution of the one-room schoolhouse, embodying distinctive characteristics of a specific vernacular building type and method of construction." Additionally, "the Malmborg School illustrates how the early variations of the schoolhouse design were a result of the needs, aspirations, and cultural background of the community which created it." Thus, the school was inscribed onto the National Register of Historic Places based on Criterion A ("the property must make a contribution to the major pattern of American history") and Criterion B ("concerns the distinctive characteristics of the building by its architecture and construction, including having great artistic value or being the work of a master").

== See also ==
- National Register of Historic Places in Gallatin County, Montana
- List of octagonal buildings and structures in the United States
