= Polygonal Barn =

Polygonal Barn may refer to:

== United States ==
(by state then town)

- Ben Colter Polygonal Barn, St. Marys Township, Adams County, Indiana, listed on the National Register of Historic Places (NRHP)
- Dyas Hexagonal Barn, Bellevue, Iowa, NRHP-listed
- Polygonal Barn, New Oregon Township, Cresco, Iowa, NRHP-listed
- W.J. Buck Polygonal Barn, Diagonal, Iowa, NRHP-listed
- McCoy Polygonal Barn, Hepburn, Iowa, NRHP-listed
- Polygonal Barn, Van Buren Township, Jackson County, Iowa, NRHP-listed
- Polygonal Barn, Lincoln Township, Johnson County, Iowa, NRHP-listed
- Thomas Reburn Polygonal Barn, New Albin, Iowa, NRHP-listed
- William Haner Polygonal Barn, Pisgah, Iowa, NRHP-listed
- Thomas Johnson Polygonal Barn, Wellman, Iowa, NRHP-listed
- Kuykendall Polygonal Barn, Romney, West Virginia, NRHP-listed

== See also ==
- Octagon Barn (disambiguation)
- Round Barn (disambiguation)
