= Subscription school =

Historical type of private school

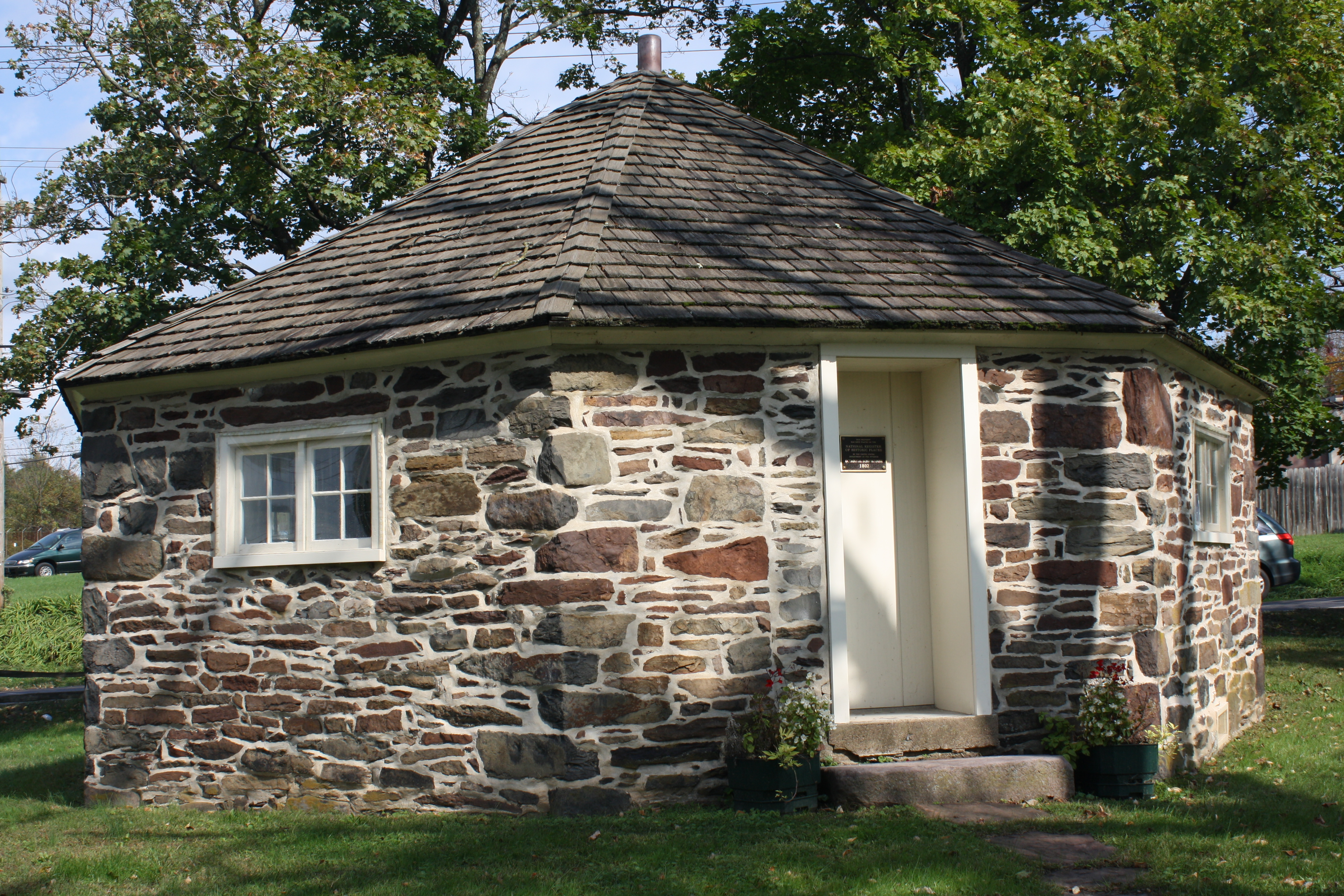
The Wrightstown Octagonal Schoolhouse in Pennsylvania was home to a subscription school from 1802 to 1850.

A subscription school was a type of private school that operated in the 19th century in rural areas of the United States before the rise of common schools, and also in parts of the United Kingdom.

== History ==
The funding model of subscription schools differed from other schools in that rather than funding the school with either tax revenue or fixed tuition, parents paid "by the scholar," paying only for the number of days their child actually attended. Because parents did not have to pay when their children were unable to attend, this model was well-suited to pre-industrial rural life in which children were often required to do farm labor for long periods of the year. For this reason, subscription schools were often open only during the winter.

"Locally organized and informally governed," a subscription school was typically a one-room affair with a single teacher. Subscription schools were not subject to any central control or standardization, in terms of either the teacher's qualifications or the subjects taught. The level of education was generally limited to the primary grades.

Typically, prior to establishing a subscription school, the surrounding area would be canvassed to determine whether there were enough parents in the area who were prepared to pay to send their children to the school.

Because only those whose parents could afford to pay were able to attend, subscription schools exacerbated rural inequality and illiteracy by depriving the children of the rural poor of any education whatsoever. However, because replacement of subscription schools by common schools entailed a loss of local control, the transition to public schooling was often the subject of bitter political controversy.

Subscription schools faced competition not only from public schools, but in some areas also from the elementary departments of seminaries and academies, which typically also provided education up to or beyond the secondary level.

In areas where established schools were limited to whites only, the subscription school model was often used by African American or Native American teachers and students. For example, the first known African-American school in St. Louis, Missouri was a subscription school that future Senator Hiram Revels established in 1856. In North Carolina, the first school serving the Lumbee tribe was a subscription school established in 1870.

Subscription schools funded and taught by African Americans became widespread in the American South after the Civil War. In Jefferson City, Missouri, Black veterans of the Civil War founded the Lincoln Institute as a subscription school in 1866. Subscription schools for Black students in the South continued well beyond the end of the Reconstruction era.

In some parts of the United States such as Oklahoma, subscription schools continued to be established into the early 20th century.

== See also ==
- One-room school

== Works cited ==
- Douglass, Robert Sidney (1912). History of Southeast Missouri. Vol. 1. ISBN 9780722207536.
- Hannel, Eric (2015). Reinterpreting a Native American Identity: Examining the Lumbee through the Peoplehood Model. Lexington Books. ISBN 9781498522120.
- Johnson, Charles B. (1925). "The Subscription School and the Seminary in Pioneer Days". Proceedings of the Illinois State Historical Society. 32: 54–59.
- Painter, Nell Irvin (1992). Exodusters: Black Migration to Kansas After Reconstruction. W. W. Norton & Company. ISBN 9780393009514.
- Riney-Kehrberg, Pamela (2016). The Routledge History of Rural America. Routledge. ISBN 9781135054984.
- Stepp, Jesse Carl (2011). Memories of Mountain Home School. AuthorHouse. ISBN 9781463420123.
- Thomas, Sue (2006). A Second Home: Missouri's Early Schools. University of Missouri Press. ISBN 9780826216694.
