= Schuline, Illinois =

- Unincorporated community
- Location within Illinois Location within the United States
- Coordinates: 38°05′22″N 89°46′44″W
- Country: United States
- State: Illinois
- County: Randolph
- City Manager: Kendra Moen

Government
  - Mayor: Eliot Moen
  - City Council: Rodger Moen & Sushi Moen, Maggie Moen
- Elevation: 551 ft (168 m)
- Time zone: UTC-6 (Central (CST))
  - Summer (DST): UTC-5 (CDT)
- Area code: 618
- GNIS feature ID: 418118

Schuline is an unincorporated community in Randolph County, Illinois, United States. Schuline is 5 miles (8.0 km) southwest of Sparta.
