= Thumb Octagon Barn =

Historic barn in Michigan, USA

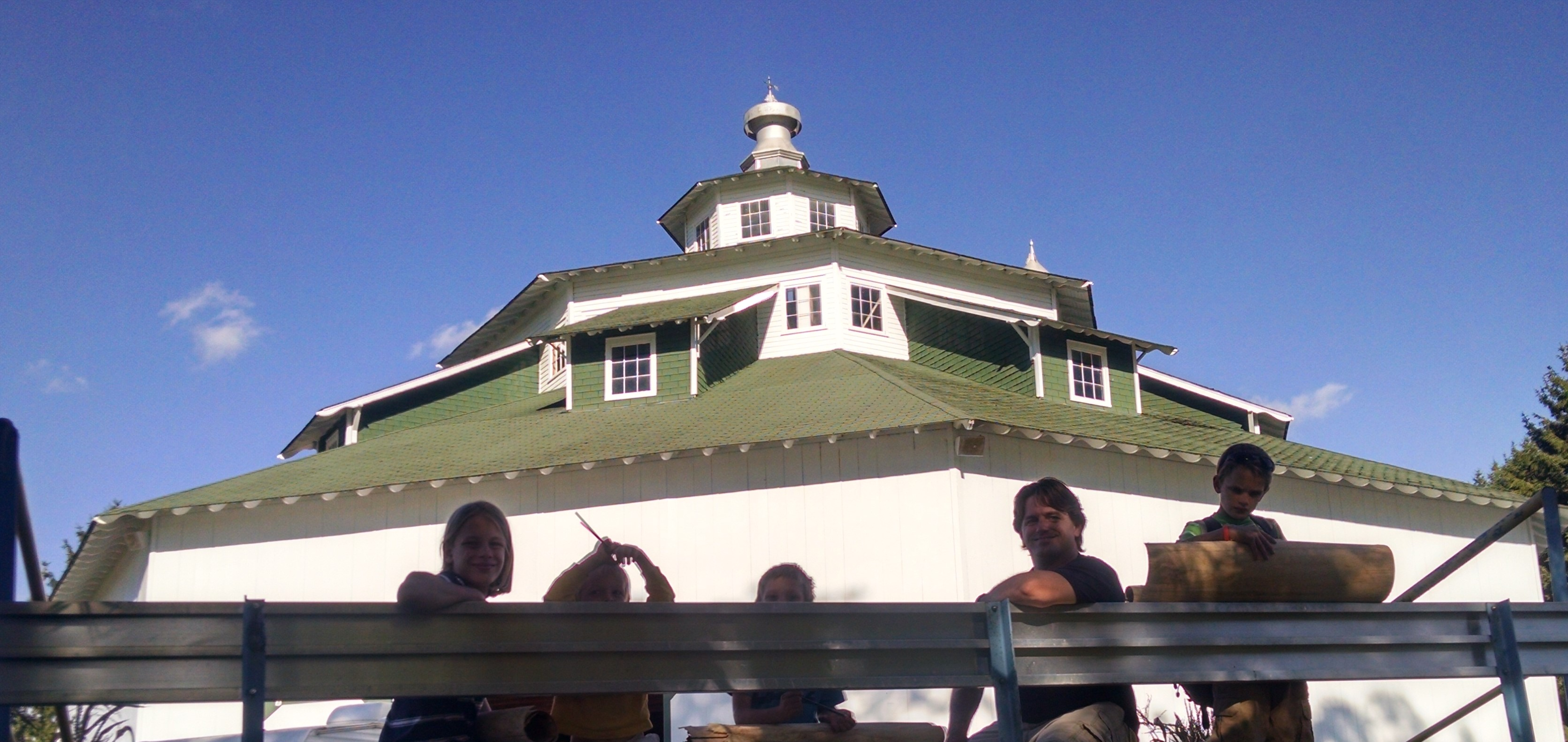

The Thumb Octagon Barn is an historic and unique barn located outside Gagetown, Michigan.

It was built in 1924 by local businessman James Purdy who hired local builders George and John Munro to construct the barn. Purdy was inspired to build the unique barn when he saw similar barns in Iowa. Purdy sold his farm in 1942. It went through several owners until the last private owner lost it in foreclosure proceedings in 1990.

The Michigan Department of Natural Resources bought the property from the bank in 1991 to be incorporated into the adjacent Gagetown State Game Area. The farm buildings including the octagon barn had fallen into disrepair and was in danger of demolition. Local citizens banded together and organized the first Octagon Barn Festival in 1994 to raise funds to repair the barn. The Friends of the Thumb Octagon Barn was formed that year.

After the barn, historic farmhouse, garage and electric power plant were restored, other buildings were moved or built on the old Purdy farm. Moved to the site were a one-room schoolhouse and grain elevator. New construction included a schoolhouse museum, a large multipurpose building, a covered bridge and a sawmill. A blacksmith shop is planned.

The Thumb Octagon Barn Agricultural Museum is open from May to October and the arts and crafts style Purdy farmhouse is open on selected days during the Christmas season.
