= Octagon Stone Schoolhouse =

- U.S. National Register of Historic Places
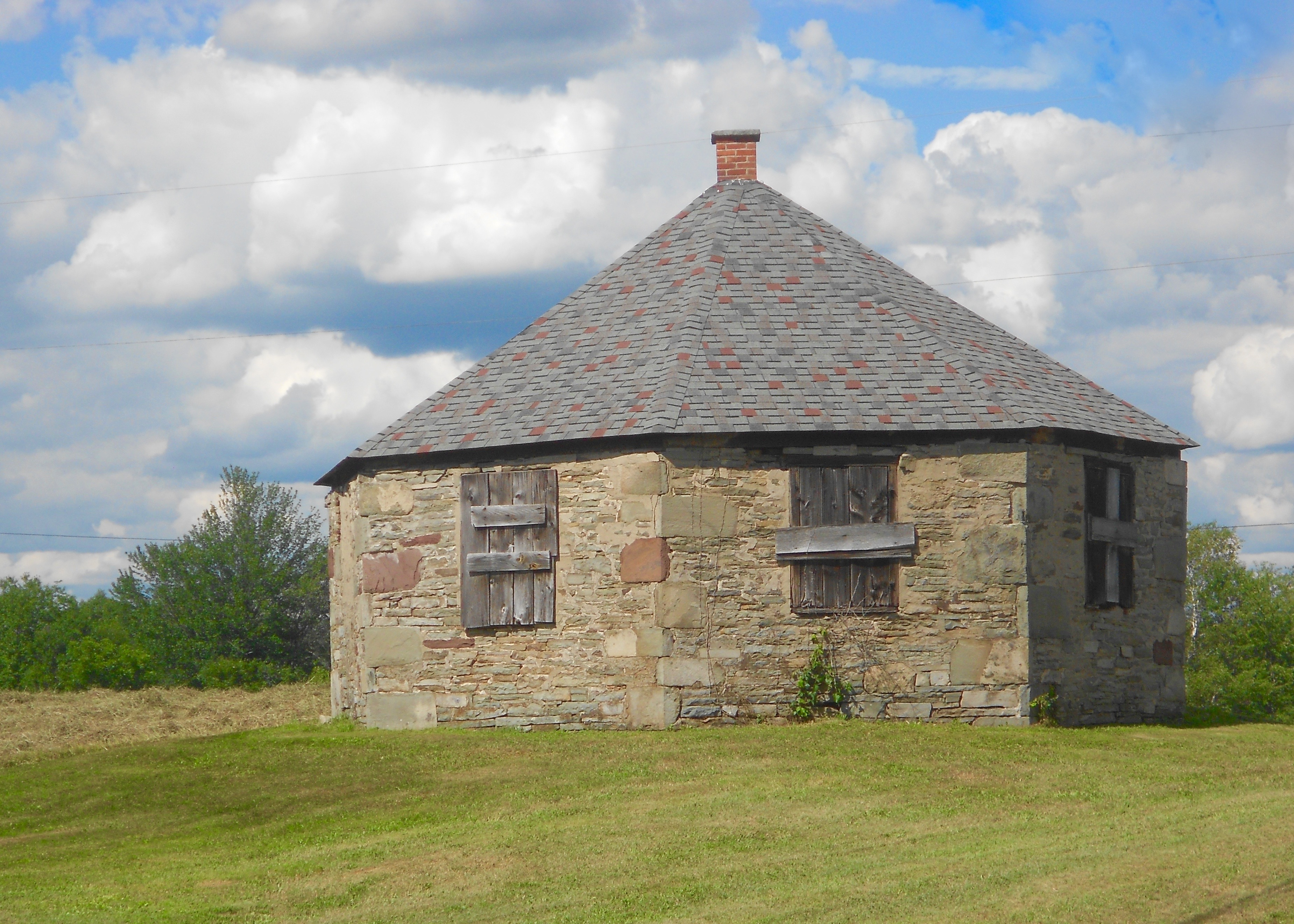

- Location within Pennsylvania Location within the United States
- Location: 1 mile (1.6 km) southwest of South Canaan, South Canaan Township, Pennsylvania
- Coordinates: 41°29′42″N 75°25′53″W
- Area: 0.8 acres (0.32 ha)
- Built: c. 1830
- NRHP reference No.: 77001200
- Added to NRHP: May 6, 1977

The Octagon Stone Schoolhouse, also known as The Stone Jug, is an historic, one-room school building in South Canaan Township, Wayne County, Pennsylvania, United States.

It was added to the National Register of Historic Places in 1977.

== History and architectural features ==
Built circa 1830, this historic structure is an octagonal shaped, one-room, fieldstone building. It was used as a school until 1900, after which it was used for storage.

== Gallery ==
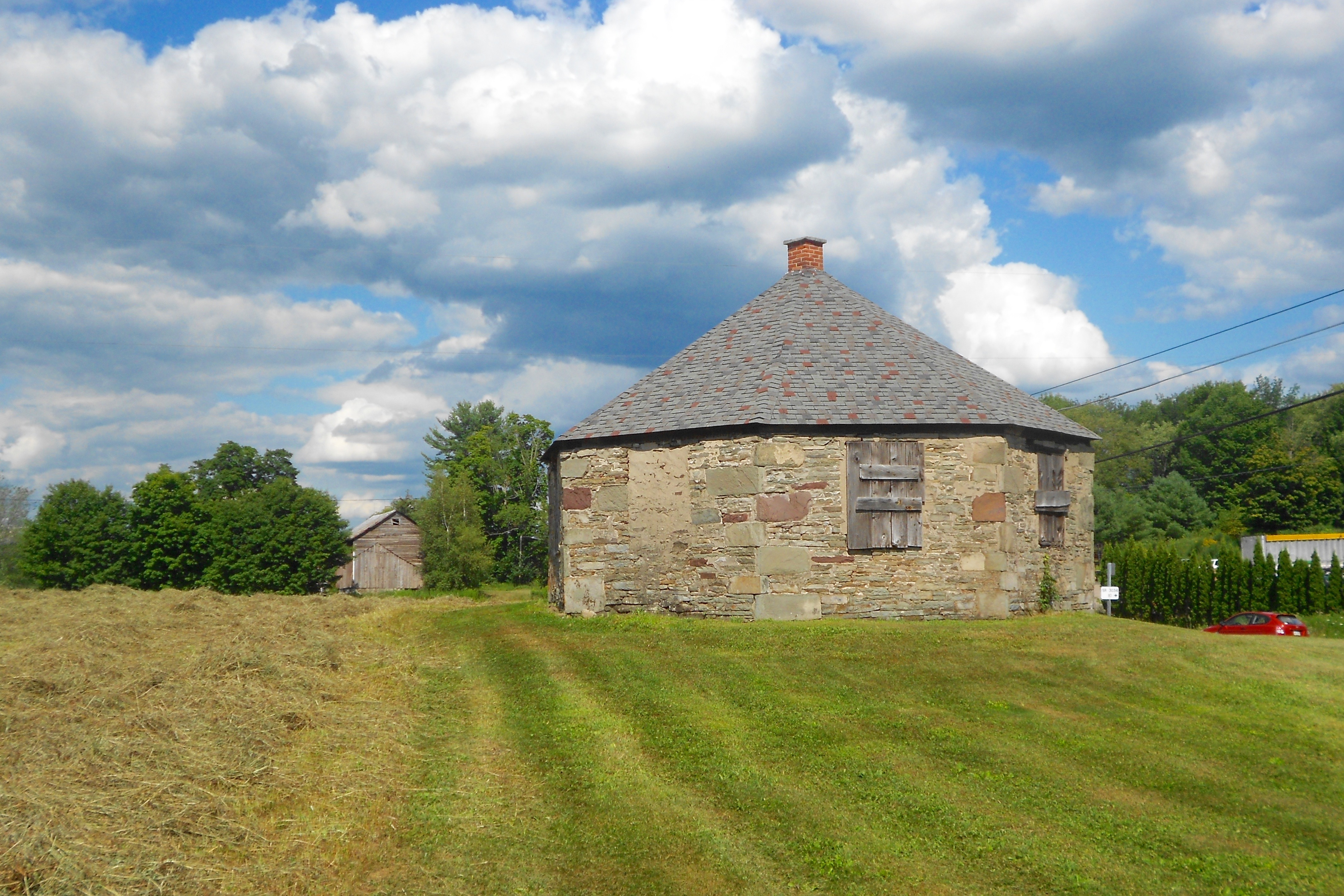

== See also ==
- Sodom Schoolhouse
