= Charter Oak Schoolhouse =

Historic building in Illinois, US

- U.S. National Register of Historic Places
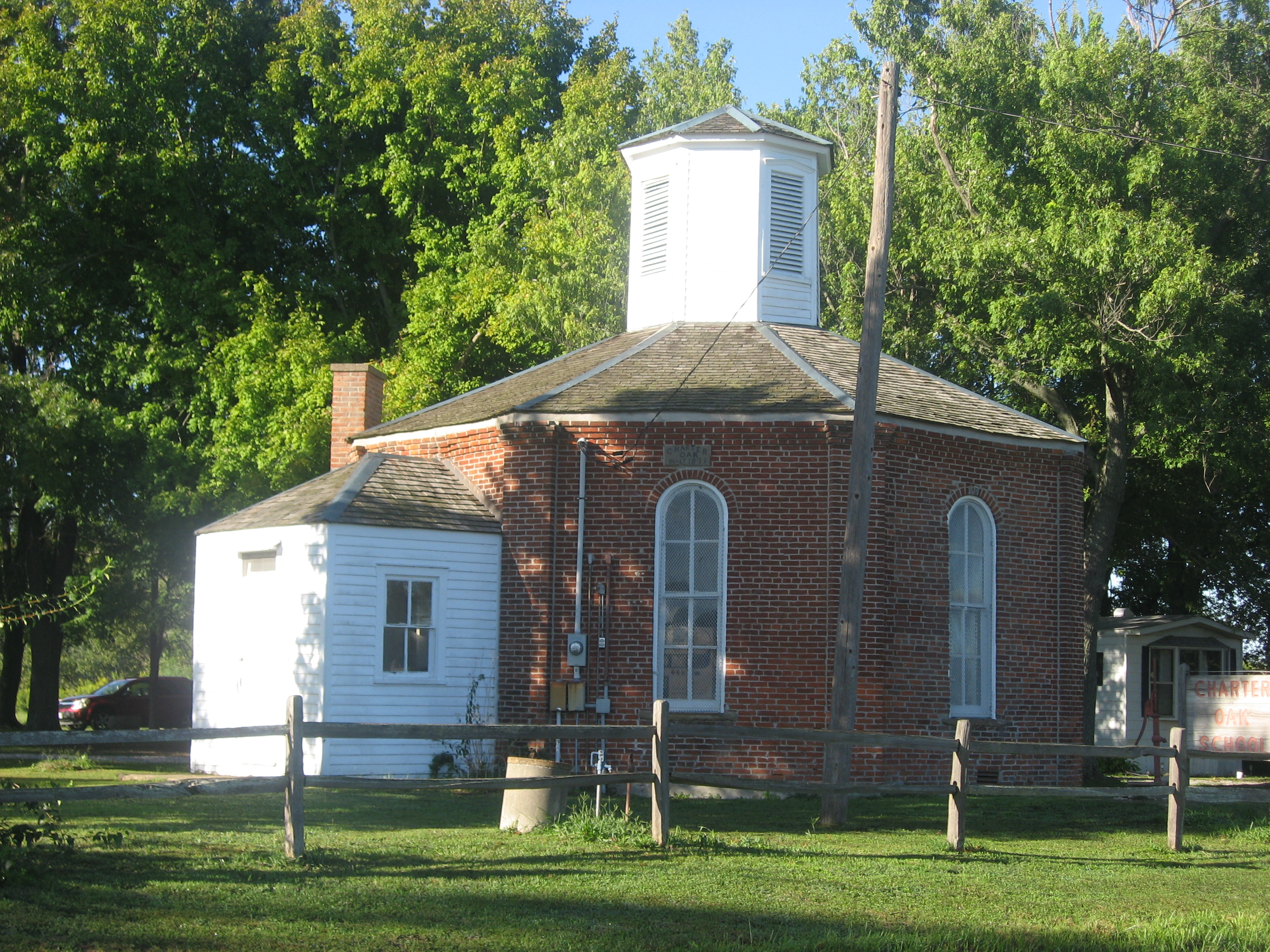
- Front of the schoolhouse

- Location within Illinois Location within the United States
- Nearest city: Schuline, Illinois
- Coordinates: 38°5′21″N 89°47′38″W
- Built: 1873
- Architect: William M. Holcomb
- Architectural style: Octagon Mode
- NRHP reference No.: 78001181
- Added to NRHP: October 11, 1978

The Charter Oak Schoolhouse is a historic octagonal school building in Schuline, Illinois, located on the Evansville/Schuline Road between Schuline and Walsh. Built in 1873, it served as a public primary school until 1953. The school was one of 53 octagonal schoolhouses built in the United States, of which only three survive. The building is now used as a museum by the Randolph County Historical Society and is listed on the National Register of Historic Places.

== Architecture ==
The one-room schoolhouse is a one-story building with an octagonal plan. The building's foundation is made of locally quarried limestone, while the building's walls were built with red brick. A louvered belfry, which may not have been added until 1883, tops the building's low-sloping roof. Courses of corbelled brick along the roof line form the building's cornice. The vestibule at the school's entrance is sided with clapboard and rests on a concrete foundation. 53 octagonal schoolhouses were built in the United States, of which the school was the only one built in Illinois. The school is one of three of these octagonal schoolhouses which is still standing.

== History ==
Built in 1873, the Charter Oak Schoolhouse was the third public school built at its location. The first school building was a simple log structure built in 1848. The second school building, a frame structure constructed in 1863, was destroyed by a tornado, necessitating the construction of a new building. Contractor William H. Holcomb constructed the third building at a cost of $1000. The school's teacher, Daniel Bishop Ling, proposed the construction of an octagonal building, which he believed would allow more light into the classroom and be more likely to survive severe winds. In addition to classes, the school building also hosted local meetings, competitions, and political events during its tenure as a school. The school closed in 1953, as did all other one-room schoolhouses in the area. The Randolph County Historical Society purchased the building in 1960 and subsequently restored it and converted it to an interpretive center of the history of the one-room schoolhouse. The building was added to the National Register of Historic Places on October 11, 1978.
