= Brightwood Beach Cottage =

Historic house in Minnesota, United States

- U.S. National Register of Historic Places
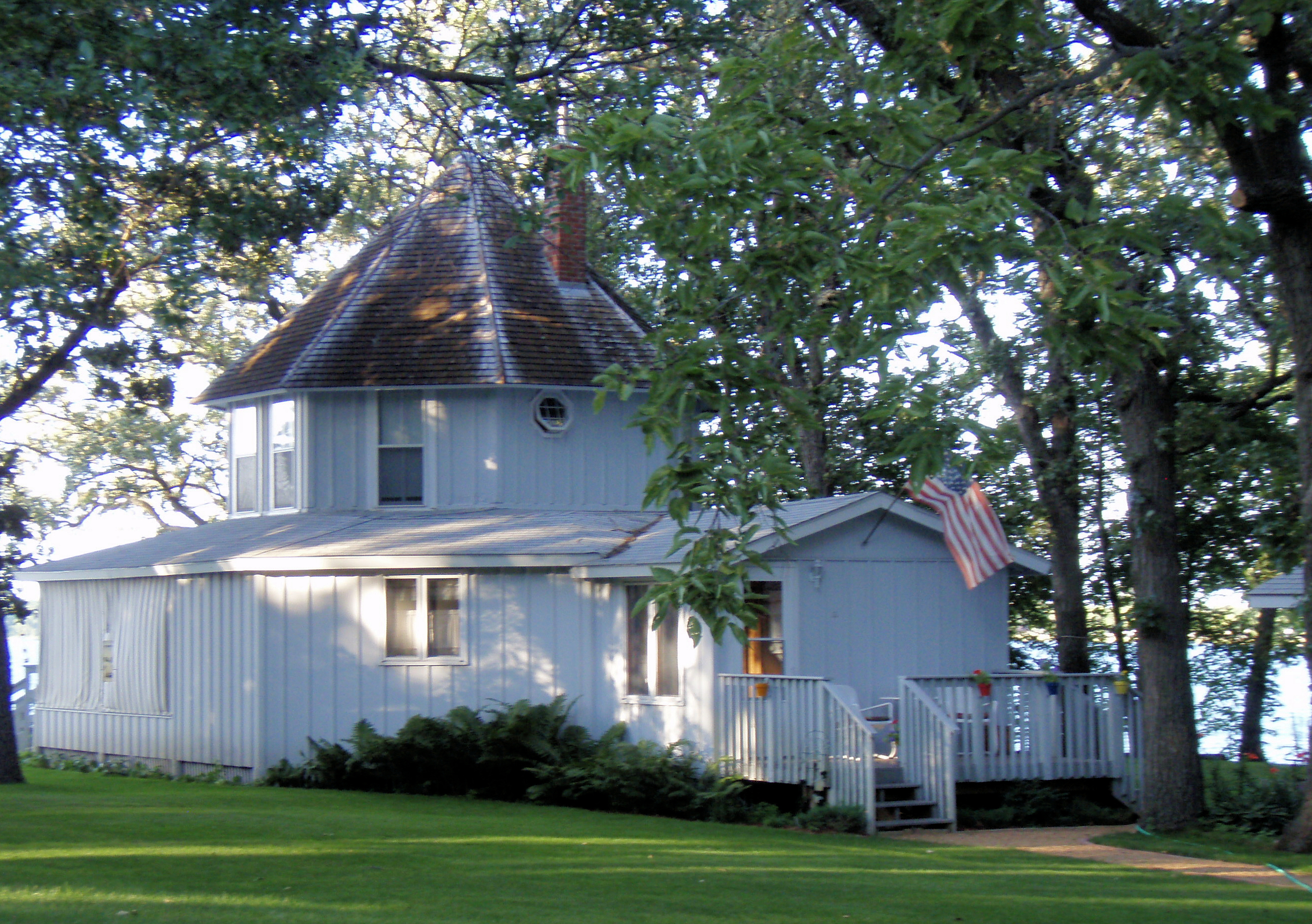

- Location within Minnesota Location within the United States
- Nearest city: Litchfield, Minnesota
- Coordinates: 45°5′54.34″N 94°32′20.29″W
- Built: 1889
- Architect: Phelps, G.B.
- NRHP reference No.: 78001551
- Added to NRHP: May 22, 1978

Brightwood Beach Cottage is an historic octagonal building on the southern shore of Lake Ripley in Litchfield, Minnesota, United States, that once was a part of the Brightwood Beach Resort of the late nineteenth century. The resort opened in 1889, and it offered cultural amenities such as concerts, classes in fine arts, and other live entertainment. Other summer activities included dancing, ball games, and canoeing and steamboat excursions on Lake Ripley. The Minnesota Editorial Association, in a report at the time, called Brightwood "the most lovely spot in Minnesota" and a "gem of a lake with pebbly shores and blue as the vaults of heaven." Thousands of people visited the resort, many of them wealthy individuals pictured in suits and fancy dresses, but the resort was not financially successful. In 1893, the resort was forced to close, a victim of the Panic of 1893 and competition from resorts to the north that became accessible by railroad. On May 22, 1978, it was added to the National Register of Historic Places
