= Atlanta Public Library (Atlanta, Illinois) =

Public library in Atlanta, Illinois, US

- U.S. National Register of Historic Places
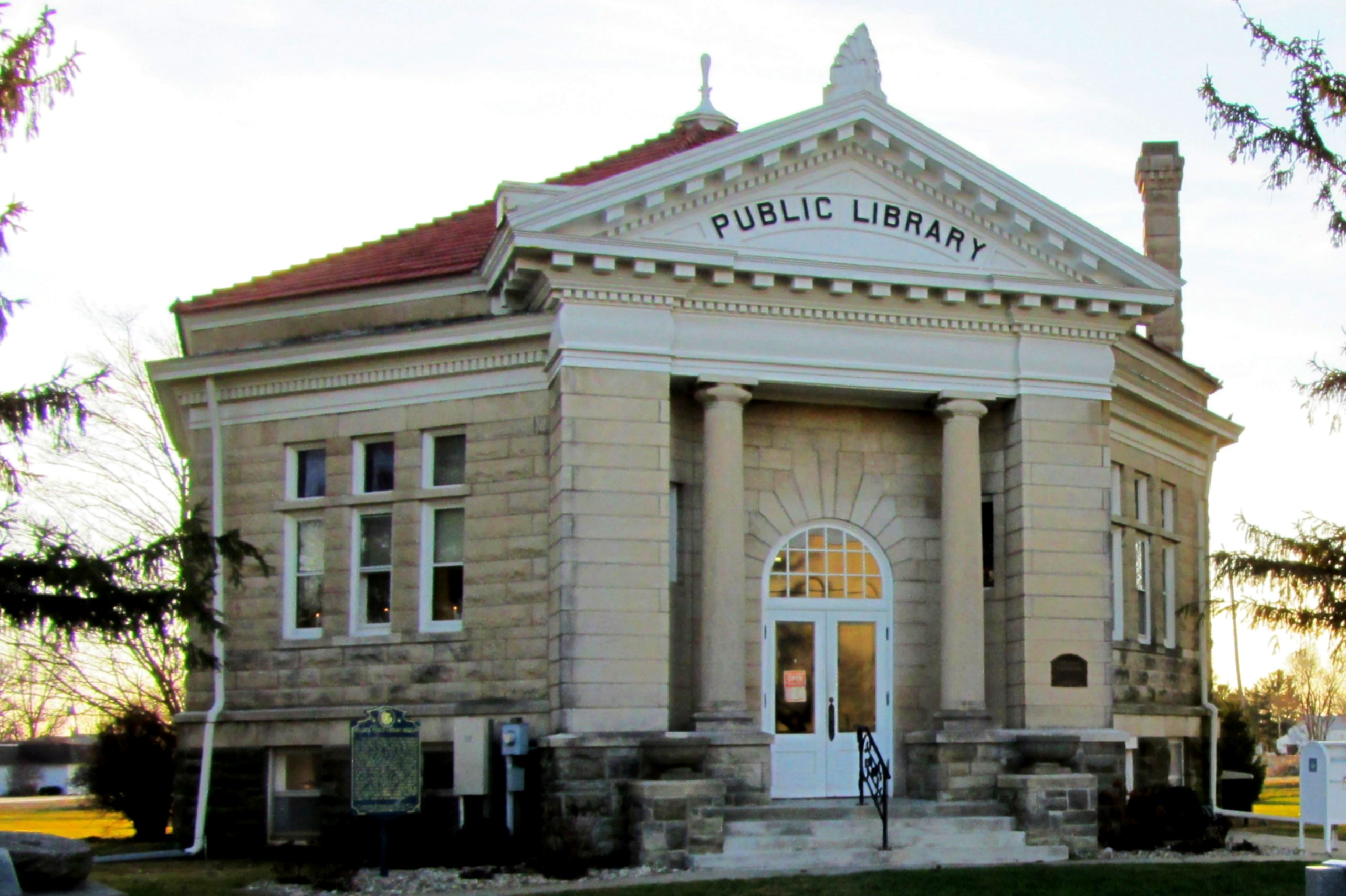

- Location within Illinois Location within the United States
- Location: Race and Arch Sts., Atlanta, Illinois
- Coordinates: 40°15′37.20492″N 89°13′56.88228″W
- Area: 0.6 acres (0.24 ha)
- Built: 1908
- Built by: Reichel, Joseph A.
- Architect: Moratz, Paul A.
- Architectural style: Classical Revival, Octagon Mode
- NRHP reference No.: 79000852
- Added to NRHP: December 11, 1979

The Atlanta Public Library, located at the intersection of Race and Arch Streets in Atlanta, Illinois, was built in 1908 and has operated continuously as a library since. Architect Paul A. Moratz's design combines the Neoclassical with an octagonal plan, an uncommon mixture of styles. The building's eight sides are all symmetrical except for the front, which is broken by a classical portico with Doric columns and a round arched entrance. The library is topped by a red tile roof.

Atlanta's public library program began in 1873. When the city built its library building in 1908, it did so through community support rather than receiving a grant from the Carnegie Foundation as most other communities did at the time. A clock tower was added to the property in the 1970s. The Atlanta Museum formerly operated in the library's basement.

The library was added to the National Register of Historic Places on December 11, 1979.
