= Secrest Octagon Barn =

- U.S. National Register of Historic Places
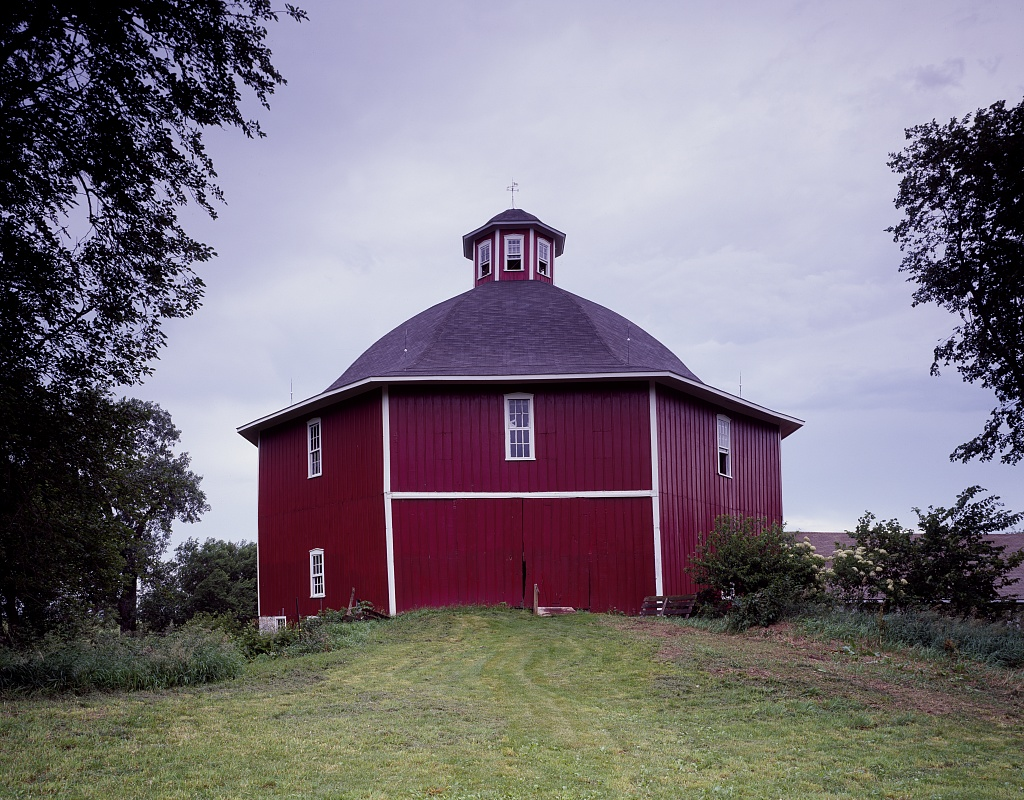

- Location within Iowa Location within the United States
- Nearest city: Downey, Iowa
- Coordinates: 41°36′49″N 91°22′13″W
- Area: less than one acre
- Built: 1883
- Built by: George Frank Longerbean
- MPS: Iowa Round Barns: The Sixty Year Experiment TR (AD)
- NRHP reference No.: 74000790
- Added to NRHP: November 5, 1974

The Secrest Octagon Barn is a historic building located near Downey in rural Johnson County, Iowa, United States. It was constructed in 1883 by master builder George Frank Longerbean for Joshua Hunt Secrest as a hay barn-horse stable. The octagonal barn measures 80 feet (24 m) in diameter. It features red vertical siding and a sectional bell shaped roof that is supported by hand-laminated beams. The octagon-shaped cupola has the same roof shape as the barn. It was listed on the National Register of Historic Places in 1974.

According to the builder's great-grandson, the builder's name is Longerbeam.
