= Octagonal Poultry House =

- U.S. National Register of Historic Places
- New Jersey Register of Historic Places
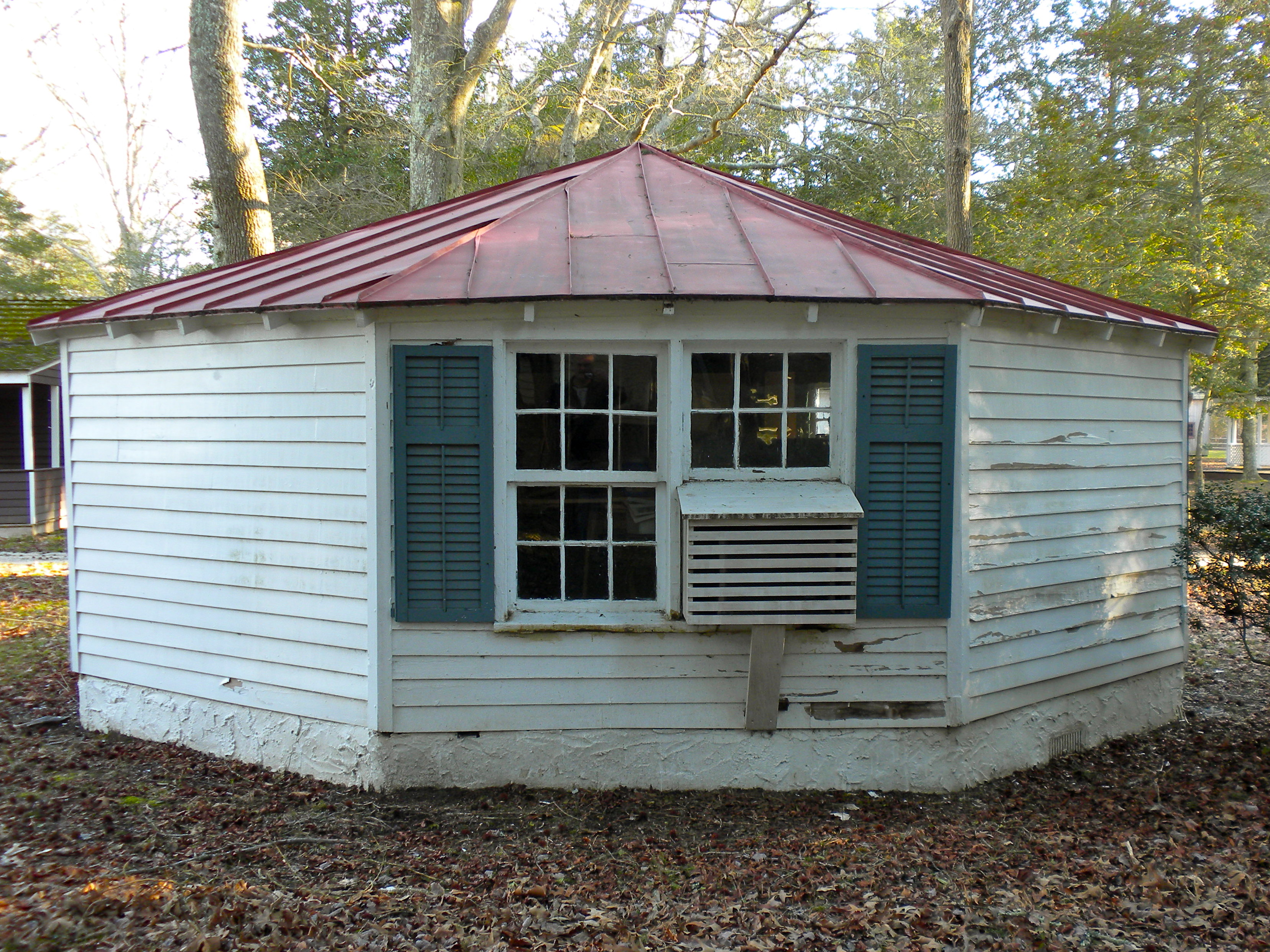

- Location within Cape May County, New Jersey Location within New Jersey Location within the United States
- Location: 720 U.S. Route 9, Lower Township, New Jersey
- Coordinates: 38°58′46″N 74°54′45″W
- Built: c. 1900
- Architectural style: Late 19th And 20th Century Revivals
- NRHP reference No.: 08000177
- NJRHP No.: 4761

Significant dates
- Added to NRHP: March 14, 2008
- Designated NJRHP: December 20, 2007

The Octagonal Poultry House, also known as the Walter P. Taylor Octagon, is located at 720 U.S. Route 9 in the Cold Spring section of Lower Township in Cape May County, New Jersey, United States. The historic octagonal farm building was built around 1900 to house hens, who supposedly like to nest in corners. Eventually it became a children's playhouse. Today the broom maker works there at Historic Cold Spring Village. Historic Cold Spring Village originally used it as a storage shed, but eventually recognized its potential as a good place to learn about the art of needlework and crocheting.

It was added to the National Register of Historic Places on March 14, 2008, for its significance in architecture.

== See also ==
- National Register of Historic Places listings in Cape May County, New Jersey
- Octagon house
