= Sodom Schoolhouse =

- U.S. National Register of Historic Places
- Pennsylvania state historical marker
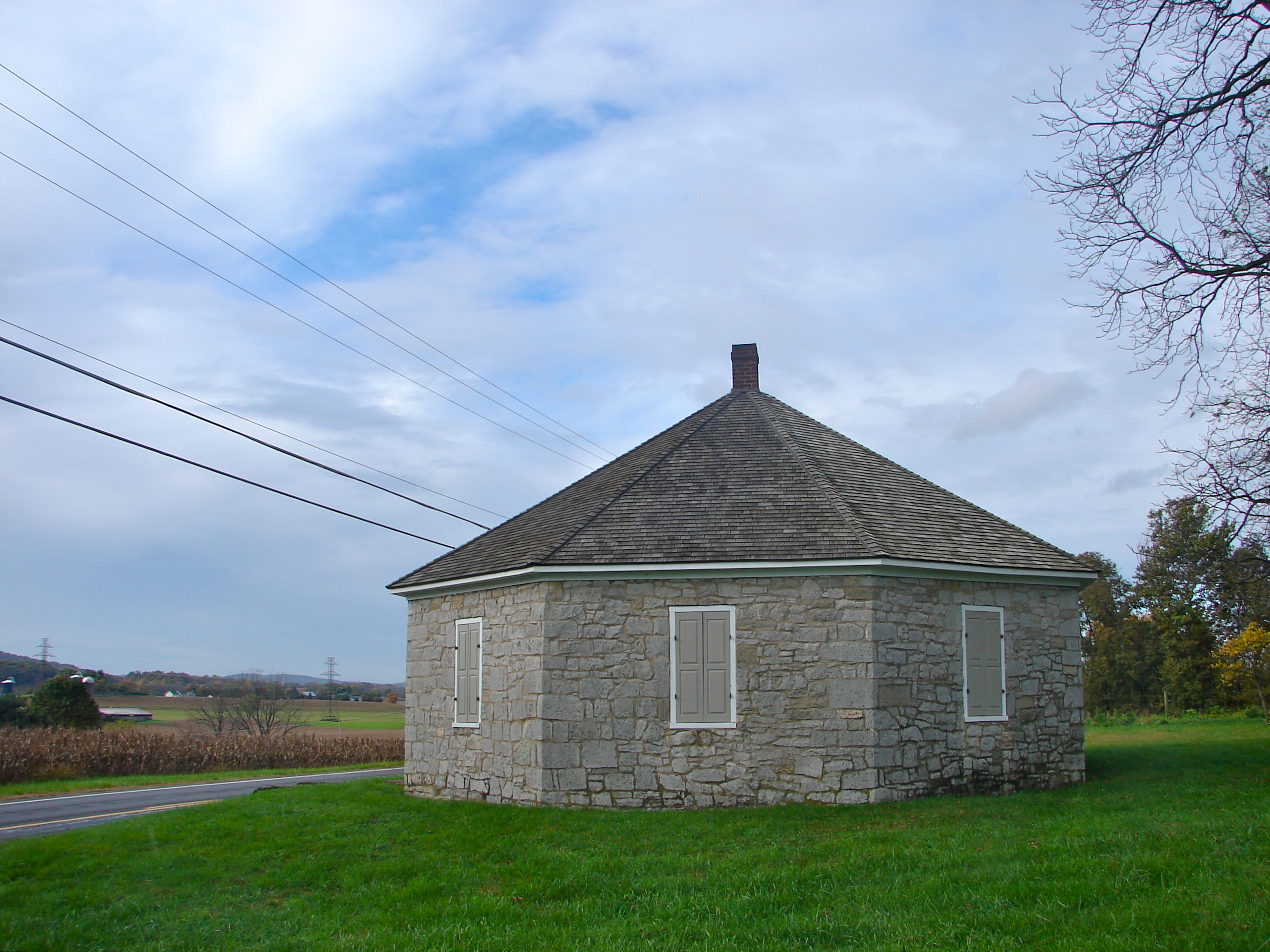

- Location within Pennsylvania Location within the United States
- Nearest city: Lewisburg, Pennsylvania
- Coordinates: 40°57′57″N 76°49′38″W
- Area: 3 acres (1.2 ha)
- Built: 1835
- Architectural style: Octagon Mode
- NRHP reference No.: 74001799

Significant dates
- Added to NRHP: 12 February 1974
- Designated PHMC: 8 May 1969

Sodom Schoolhouse is a historic octagonal school in West Chillisquaque Township, Northumberland County, Pennsylvania, United States reportedly built about 1812, 1835, or 1836 and used until 1915. It is located in a rural area on Pennsylvania Route 45 near several Scotch-Irish communities: the "small group of houses" formerly known as Sodom, which was about a mile east of the hamlet of Montandon, and about 3 miles east of a small town, Lewisburg.

== Architecture ==
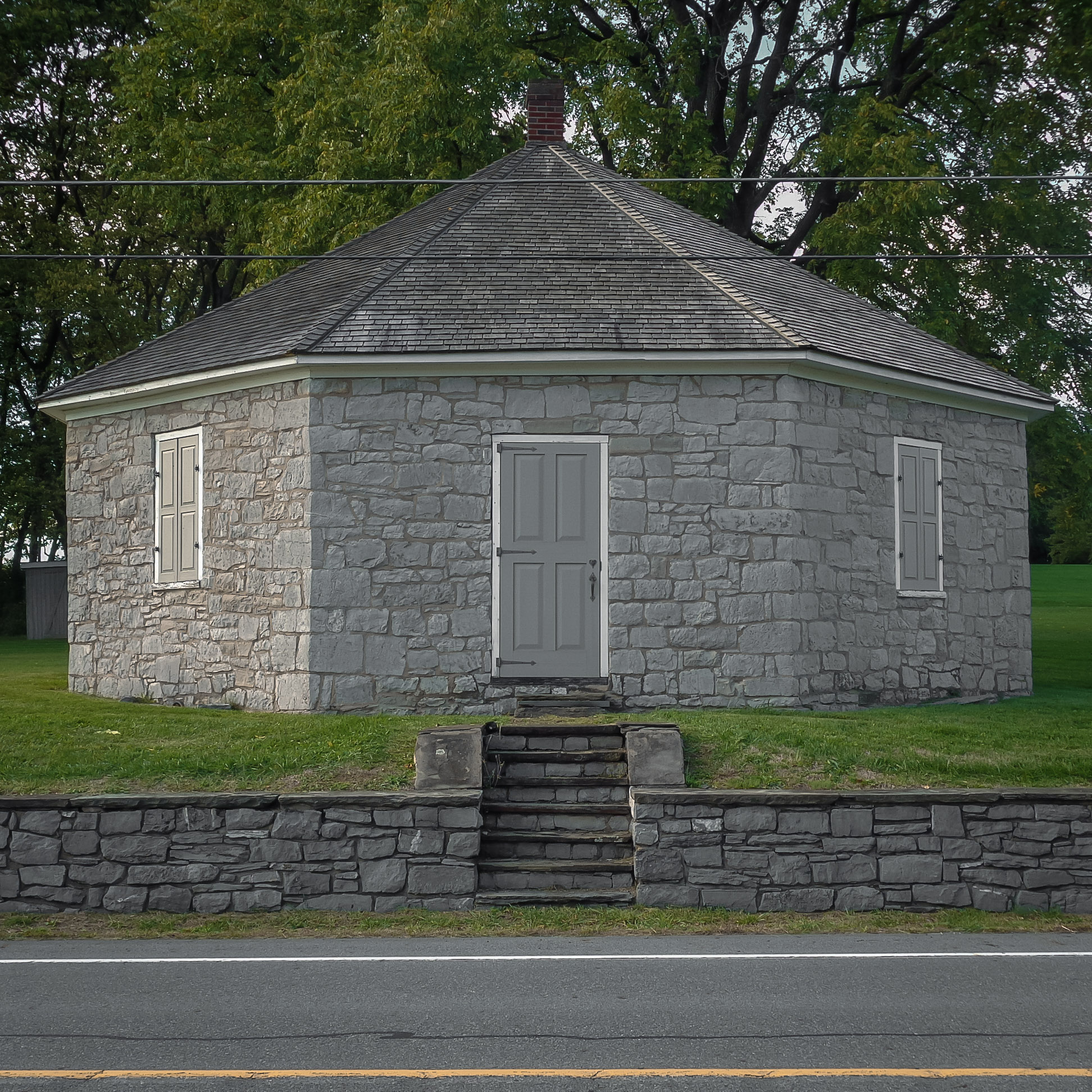
View from the south

The eight-sided single story school was built of limestone quarried nearby, has a single chimney in the center of the roof, seven windows, and a single door on the south side facing the road. A vestibule was once attached where students hung their coats. The inside was painted slate grey, and a wood-burning stove stood in the center. On the north wall was a blackboard, with a 30-foot long, 10-foot wide, 8–10-inch high platform for the teacher. The teacher's chair and desk were painted red. Two recitation benches faced the platform. Six long rough desks were placed parallel to the walls and two more were placed in the center of the room. Students within a three-mile radius attended, sometimes as many as 100 at one time, but usually only 40–60 students attended.

== History ==
The name of the school may come from the "Sodom Tavern" which did business in Montandon 1832–1855, or from the hamlet of Sodom which was named by Lot Carson, the owner of another tavern, who died by falling down a well while drunk. Carson may have donated much of the building material to the school. Until 1858 the school building was also used as a Methodist Church on Sundays. It was also used for political meetings and elections.

A cupola and bell once stood above the front door. Stories, or perhaps legends, say that the building of school was delayed by the start of the War of 1812 when the builders went off to war, and not completed until their return from the war. The hamlets of Montandon and Sodom, however, were not established until the 1830s and 1835 is a more commonly accepted construction date.

Several similar octagonal schools were built in Pennsylvania, especially in Chester County and rural Philadelphia County, for example the Diamond Rock Schoolhouse (1818), Birmingham Friends Octagonal School (1819), and the Hood Octagonal School (1841). One source suggests that octagonal schools are related to a Quaker educational movement that started about 1800 in England as the Industrial Revolution was beginning. Clapham School, built 1810 in or near London, may have been one of the first octagonal schools.

Restoration efforts started in 1935 and were completed in 1961 through the efforts of the Junior Historians Club at Milton High School.
