= Octagon Barn, Richland Township =

- U.S. National Register of Historic Places
- Location within Iowa Location within the United States
- Nearest city: Jamaica, Iowa
- Coordinates: 41°49′23″N 94°20′14.2″W
- Area: less than one acre
- Built: 1881
- MPS: Iowa Round Barns: The Sixty Year Experiment TR
- NRHP reference No.: 86001433
- Added to NRHP: June 30, 1986

The Octagon Barn, Richland Township is a historic building located near Jamaica in Guthrie County, Iowa, United States. Built in 1881, this is the oldest known octagon-shaped barn extant in Iowa. It measures 70 feet (21 m) in diameter. The modified hip roof, heavy timber construction, rectangular plan, and general purpose use mark this as a Coffin type. It was named for Lorenzo S. Coffin who is thought to have built the first round barn in the state. This barn was listed on the National Register of Historic Places in 1986. The metal band Slipknot filmed the music video for Psychosocial here.
