= Tim Thering Octagon Barn =

Coordinates: 43.2937°N 90.05054°W

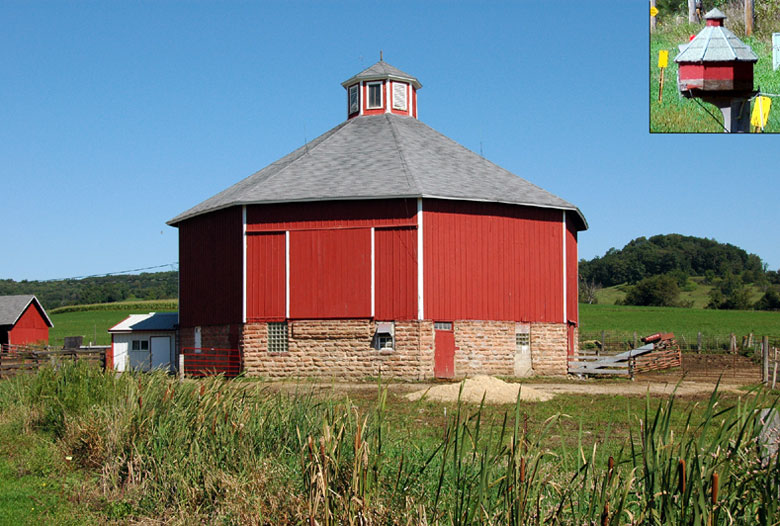
- Tim Thering Octagon Barn and owner's mail box
- Interactive map of the Tim Thering Octagon Barn area

General information
- Architectural style: Octagon Mode
- Location: near Plain, Wisconsin, United States
- Completed: 1907

The Tim Thering Octagon Barn built in 1907 is an historic octagonal barn built by Edgar Carpenter located north of Plain, Wisconsin. It is listed in Dale Travis' Wisconsin Round Barns List.
