= Fobes Octagon Barn =

- U.S. National Register of Historic Places
- Location within Iowa Location within the United States
- Nearest city: Lanesboro, Iowa
- Coordinates: 42°8′14″N 94°42′30″W
- Area: less than one acre
- Built: 1883
- MPS: Iowa Round Barns: The Sixty Year Experiment TR
- NRHP reference No.: 86001420
- Added to NRHP: June 30, 1986

The Fobes Octagon Barn is a historic building located south of Lanesboro, Iowa, United States. It was built in 1883, and at the time of its nomination it was one of 14 octagon-shaped barns from the 19th-century left in Iowa. The barn has a diameter of 66 feet (20 m) and features a stone foundation, and a hip roof with a square cupola on top. The modification of the roof suggests this is a "Coffine type" structure similar to others built by Lorenzo Coffin. The general purpose barn has two granaries, horse stalls, and the rest of the space is open for agricultural machinery. It was listed on the National Register of Historic Places in 1986.
