= Octagonal Schoolhouse (Essex, New York) =

- U.S. National Register of Historic Places
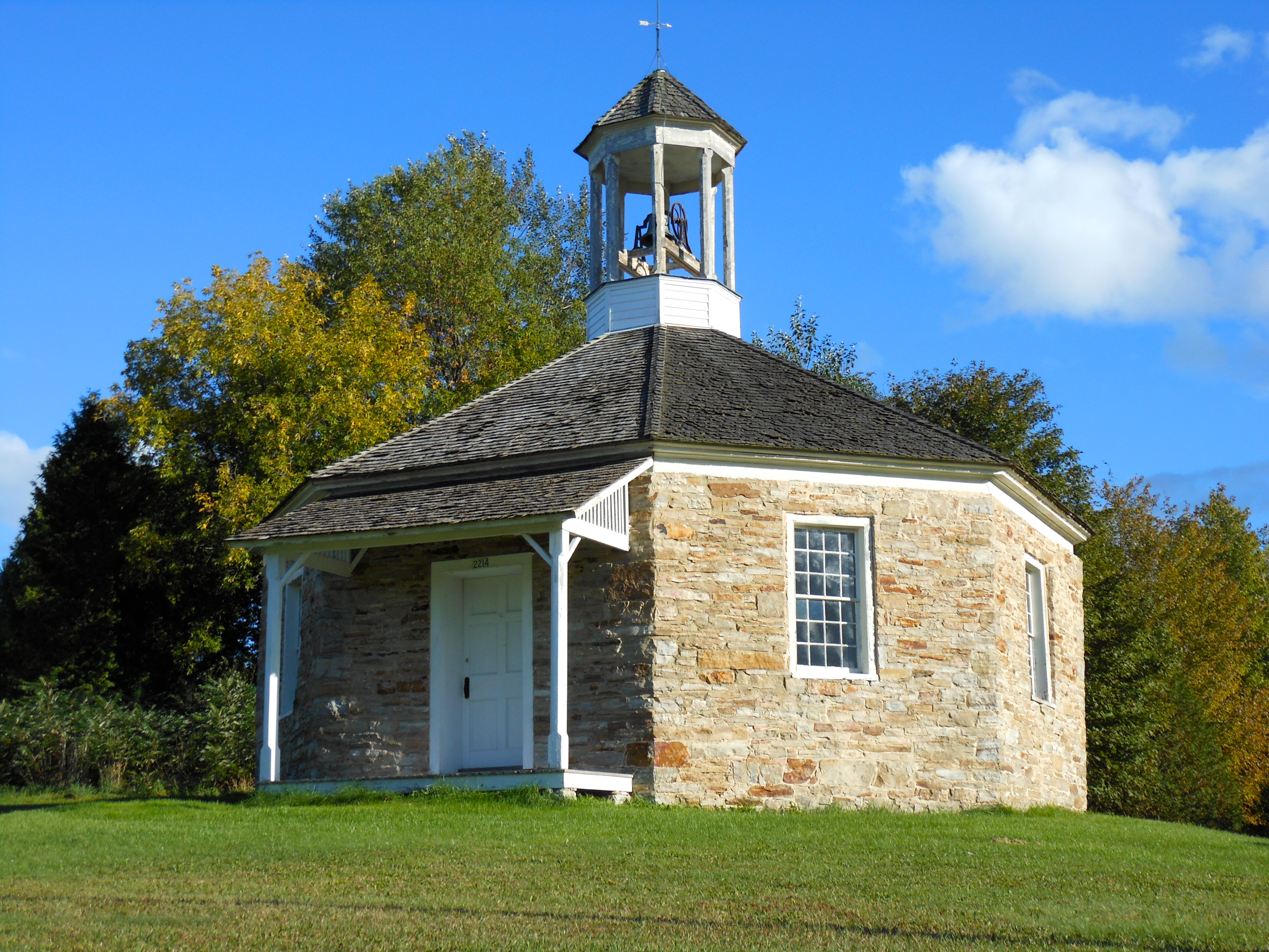

- Location within New York Location within the United States
- Nearest city: Essex, New York
- Coordinates: 44°18′14″N 73°24′8″W
- Built: 1827
- Architect: Benjamin Gilbert
- Architectural style: Octagon Mode
- NRHP reference No.: 73001190
- Added to NRHP: January 17, 1973

The Octagonal Schoolhouse built in 1827 is an historic stone octagon-shaped school building located in the hamlet of Boquet in the western part of the town of Essex, New York. On January 17, 1973, it was added to the National Register of Historic Places.

== History ==
The Octagonal Schoolhouse was completed in 1827 by mill superintendent Benjamin Gilbert was charged by mill owner William Ross to build it. The school was built using money and land donated by Mr. Ross, mill employees, and the three foot thick local stones. By 1870, attendance began declining and the school was closed in 1952.

In 2015, Governor Cuomo awarded the Town of Moriah with Town of Willsboro and Town of Essex a grant to restore the schoolhouse and two other historic properties.
