= Kinney Octagon Barn =

- U.S. National Register of Historic Places
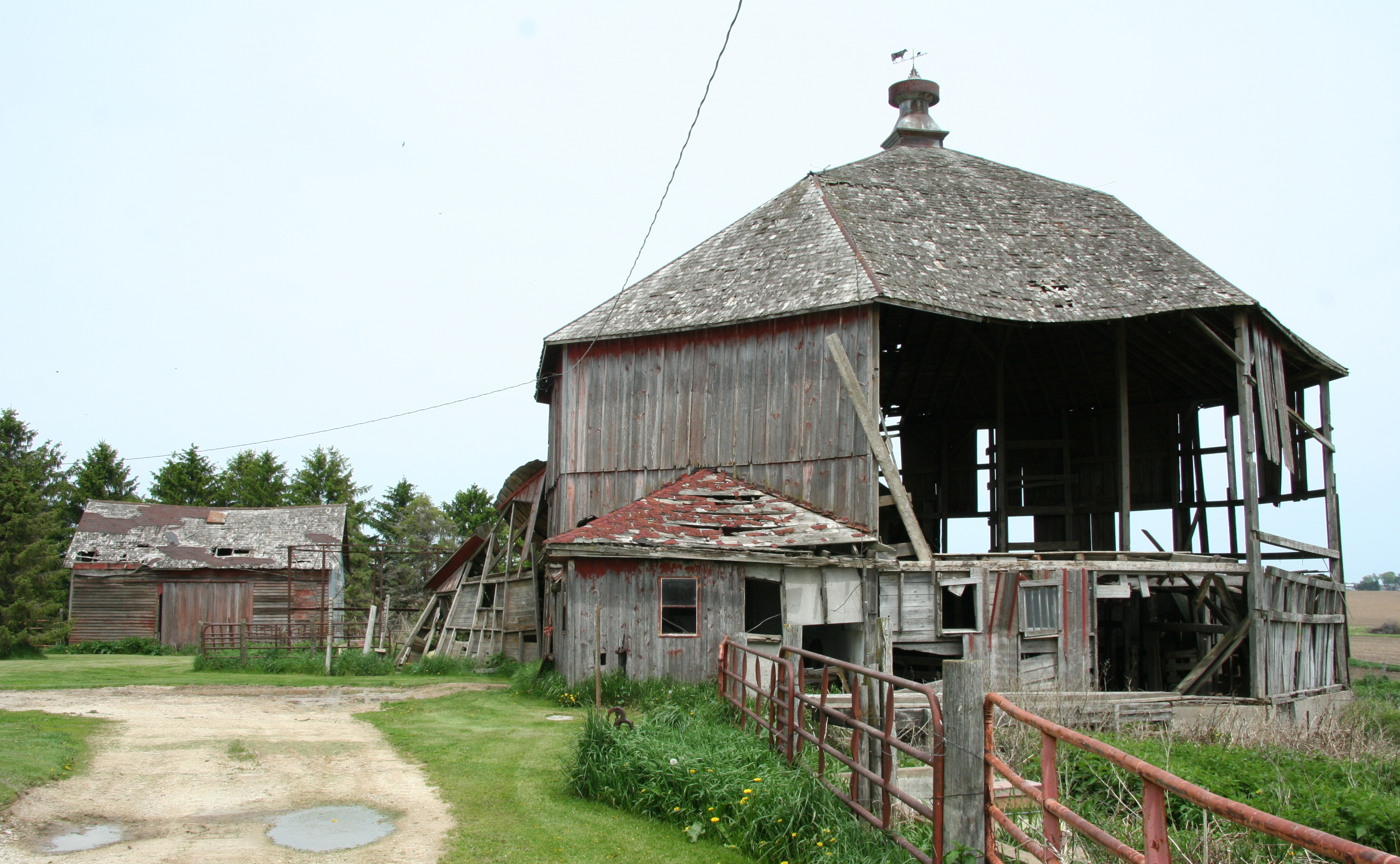
- Kinney Octagon Barn in 2010 from the south

- Location within Iowa Location within the United States
- Nearest city: Burr Oak, Iowa
- Coordinates: 43°28′21″N 91°52′4″W
- Area: less than one acre
- Built: 1880
- Built by: L.R. Kinney
- MPS: Iowa Round Barns: The Sixty Year Experiment TR
- NRHP reference No.: 86003191
- Added to NRHP: November 19, 1986

The Kinney Octagon Barn was a historic agricultural building located just north of Burr Oak, Iowa, United States. Lorenzo Coffin was a stock breeder and the farm editor of the Fort Dodge Messenger. He is thought to have built the first round barn in Iowa in 1867. The modified hip roof and heavy timber construction of this barn, built in 1880, suggests that it was a Coffin-type octagon barn. It was added to the National Register of Historic Places on November 19, 1986. It has subsequently been torn down.
