= Wrightstown Octagonal Schoolhouse =

- U.S. National Register of Historic Places
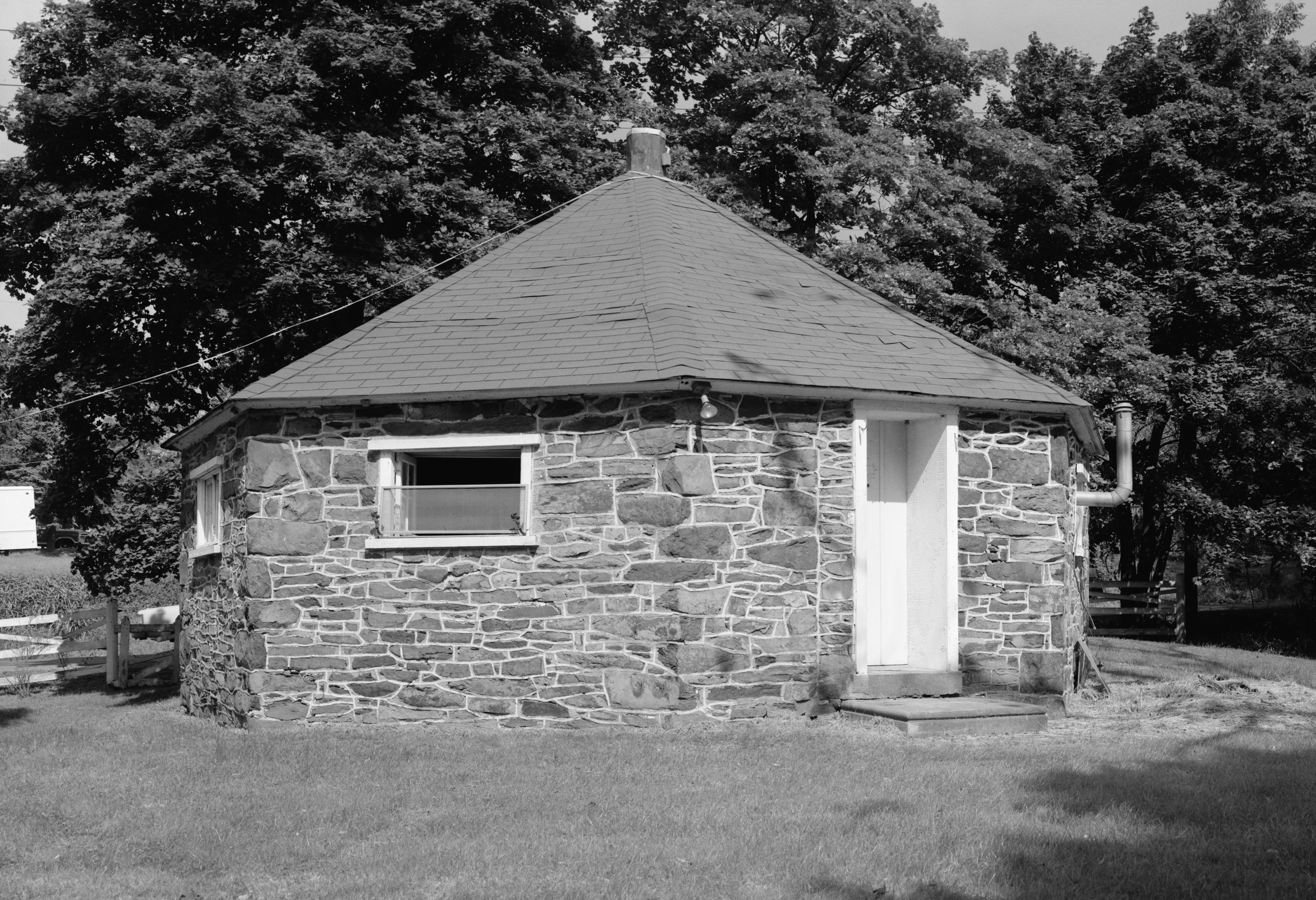
- Wrightstown Octagonal Schoolhouse HABS Photo (undated)

- Location within Pennsylvania Location within the United States
- Location: 2091 Second Street Pike, Wrightstown, Pennsylvania
- Coordinates: 40°15′17.44″N 75°0′22.94″W
- Area: less than one acre
- Built: 1802
- Architectural style: Early Republic
- NRHP reference No.: 07000586
- Added to NRHP: November 9, 2007

The Wrightstown Octagonal Schoolhouse, also known as the Wrightstown Eight Square School and the Penns Park Octagonal School, is an historic, one-room school building in Wrightstown, Wrightstown Township, Bucks County, Pennsylvania, United States.

It was added to the National Register of Historic Places in 2007.

== History and architectural features ==
Built in 1802, this historic structure is a one-story, one-room, stone schoolhouse building that has a wood-shingled, pyramidal roof and small terra cotta chimney.

It operated as a subscription school from the time of its construction until 1850. It was then used as a farm outbuilding, and, during the 1980s, as an artist's studio. It was restored in 1996 by the Wrightstown Township Historical Commission.

Historical society volunteers hold an open house here on the third Sunday of each month from May through October. Open house hours are 1:00 p.m. to 5:00 p.m. Admission is free.

== Gallery ==
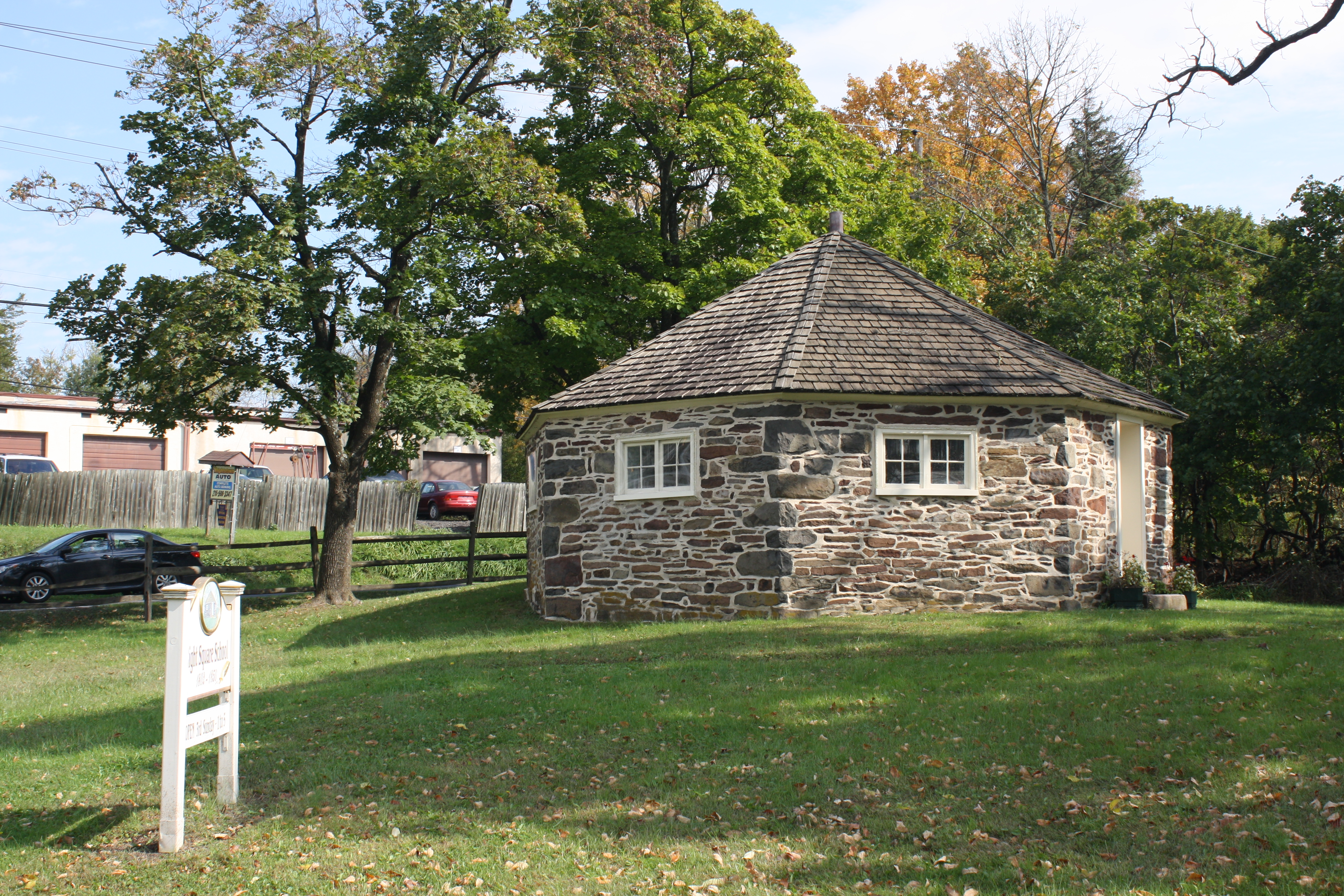

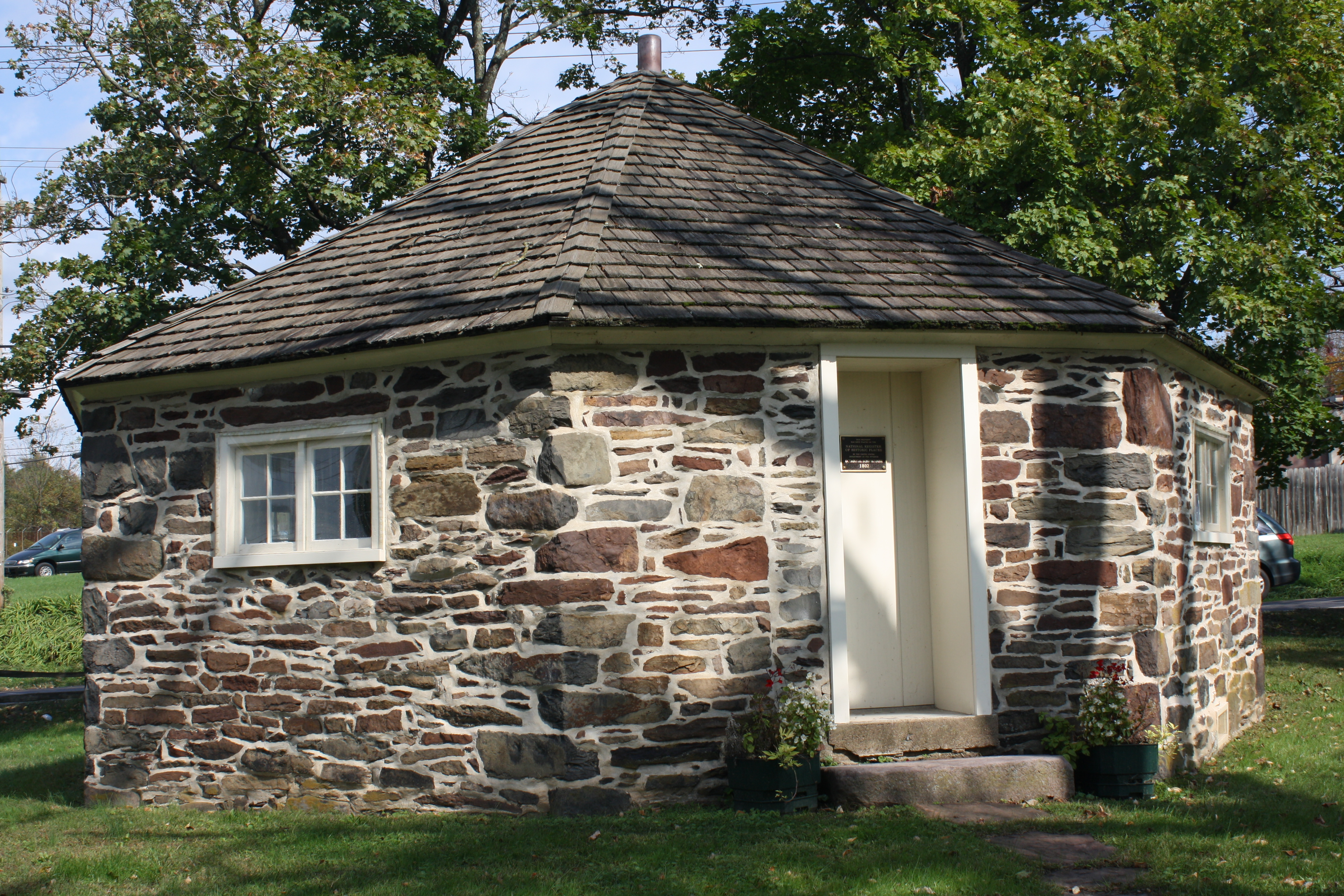

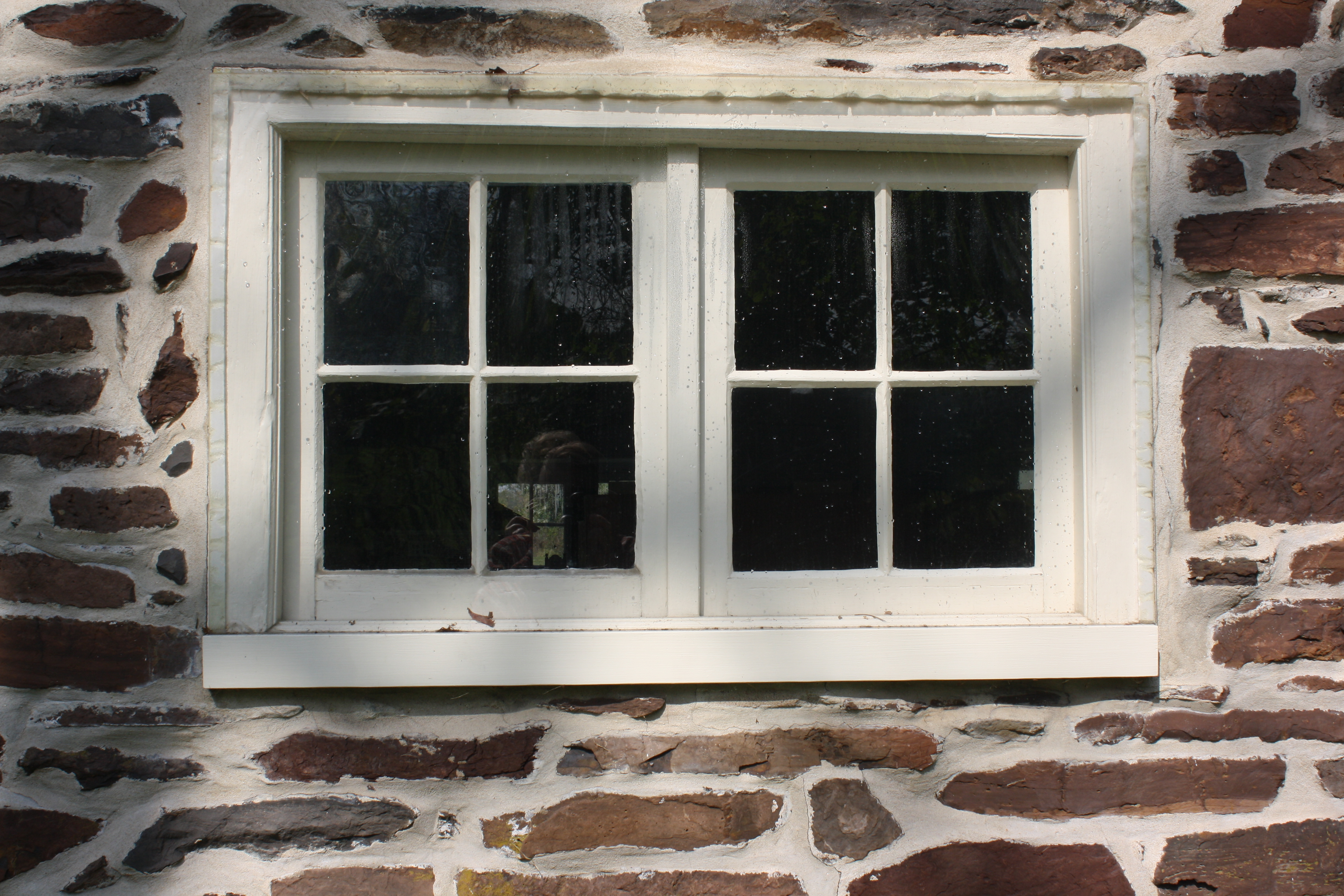

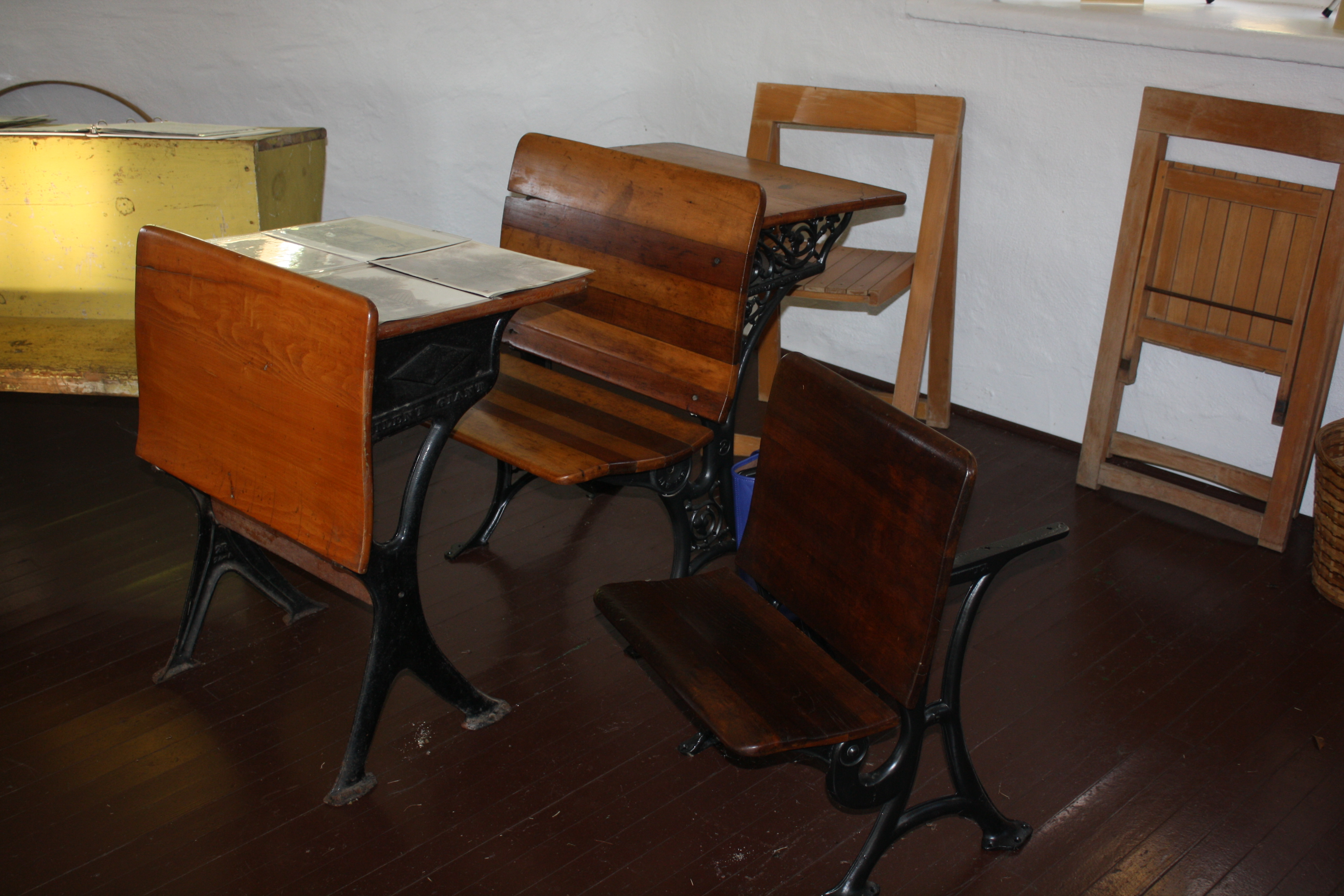

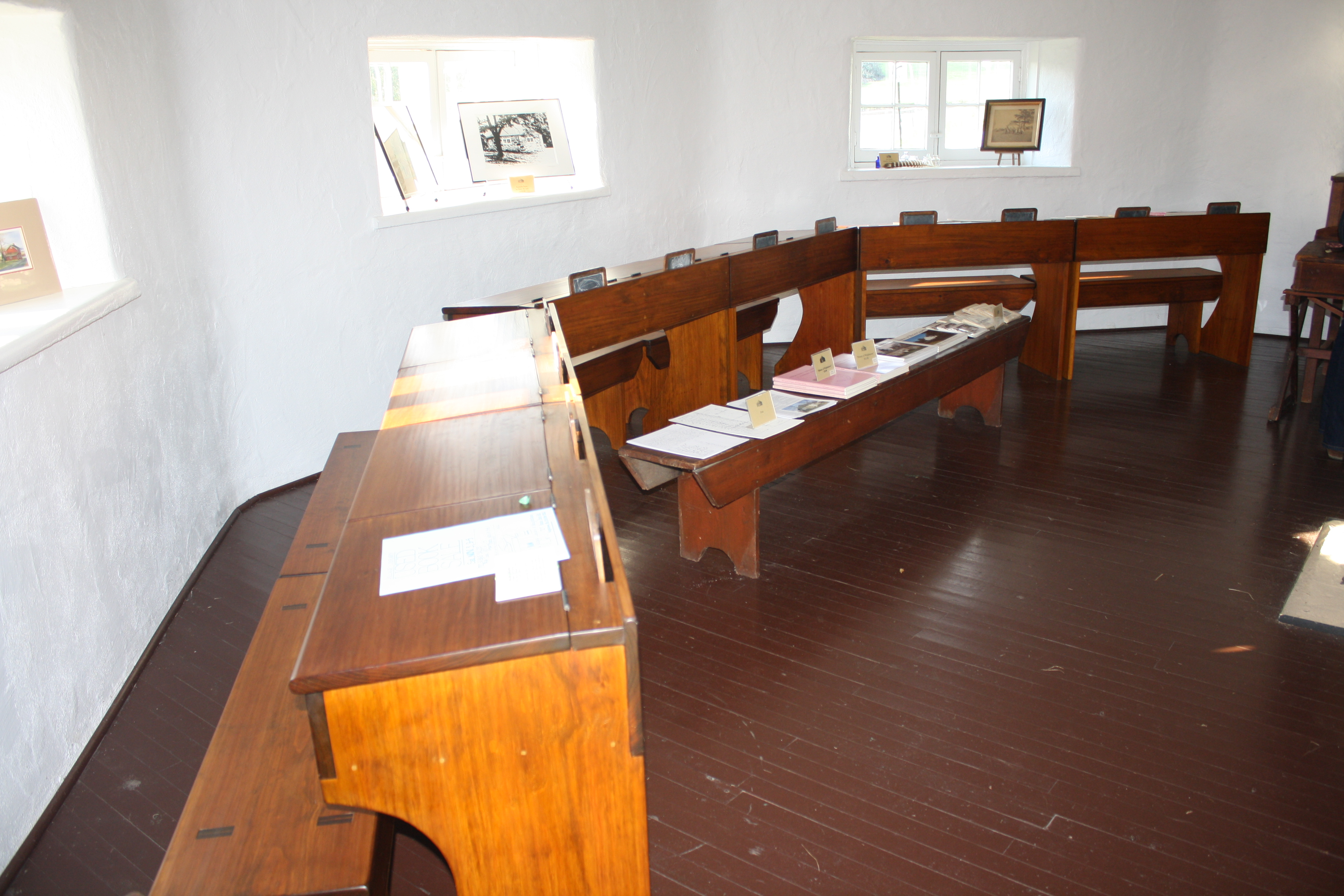

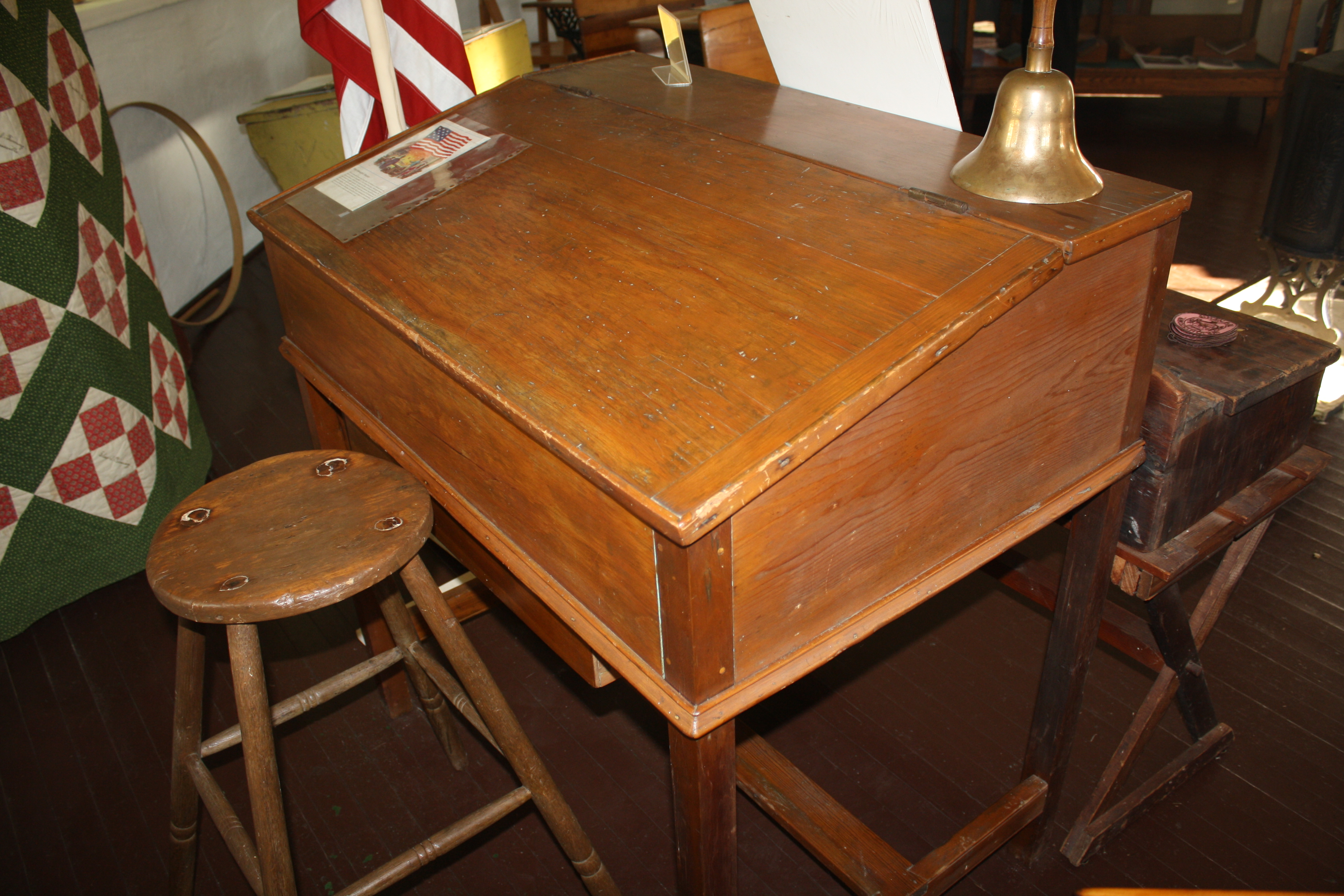

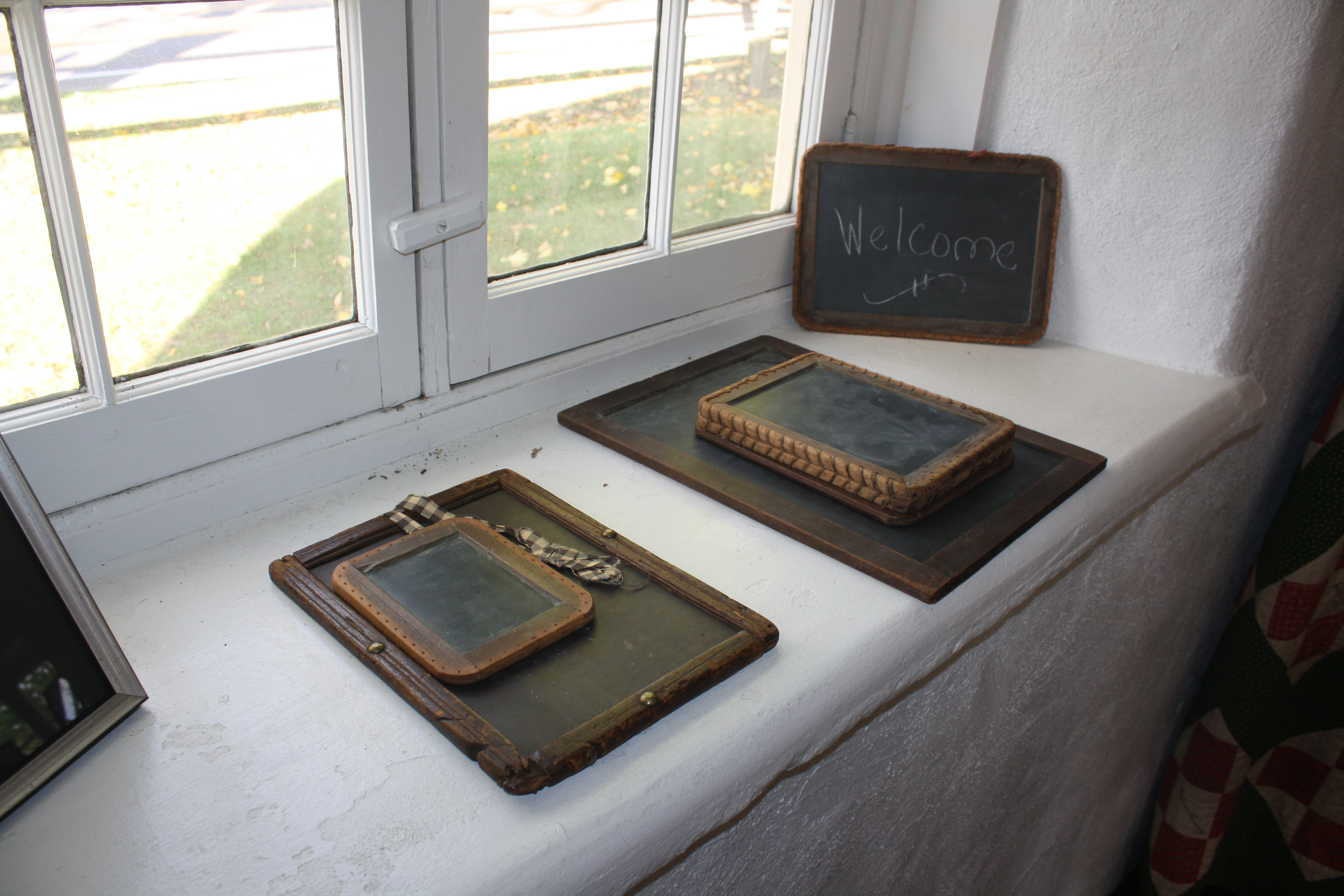
