= Roberts Octagon Barn =

- U.S. National Register of Historic Places
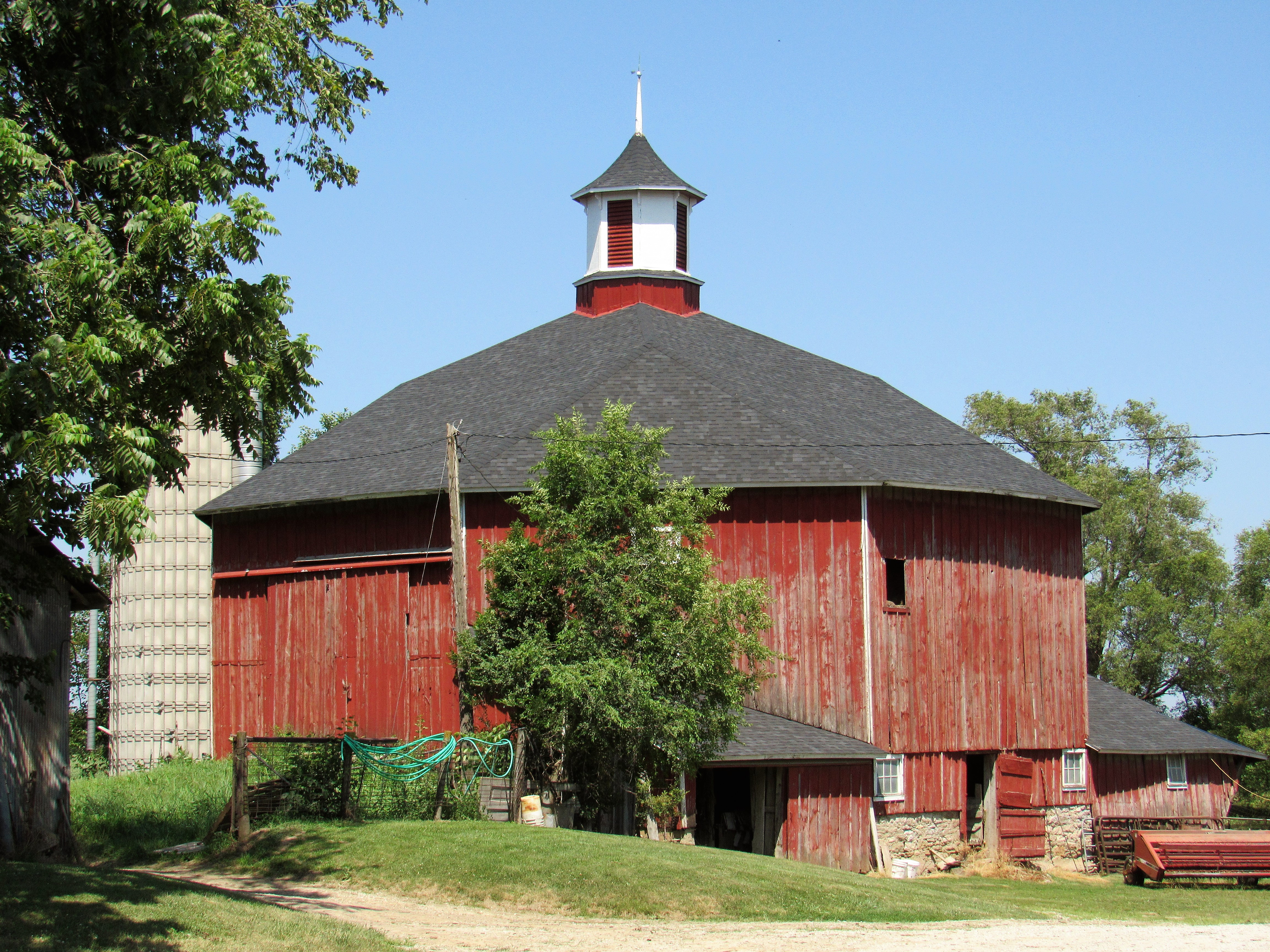

- Location within Iowa Location within the United States
- Nearest city: Sharon Center, Iowa
- Coordinates: 41°35′24″N 91°38′7″W
- Area: less than one acre
- Built: 1883
- MPS: Iowa Round Barns: The Sixty Year Experiment TR
- NRHP reference No.: 86001449
- Added to NRHP: June 30, 1986

The Roberts Octagon Barn built in 1883 is an historic octagonal barn located on CR W62 near Sharon Center, Johnson County, Iowa. On June 30, 1986, it was added to the National Register of Historic Places.

In 1986 it was believed to be one of the oldest surviving round barns in Iowa. It appears to be a "Coffin-type octagon barn" (i.e. derivative of the first octagon barn built in Iowa, in 1867, by Lorenzo Coffin). This type includes having a non-self-supporting modified hip roof, heavy timber construction, a rectangular interior plan, and general purpose function.
