= Hood Octagonal School =

- U.S. National Register of Historic Places
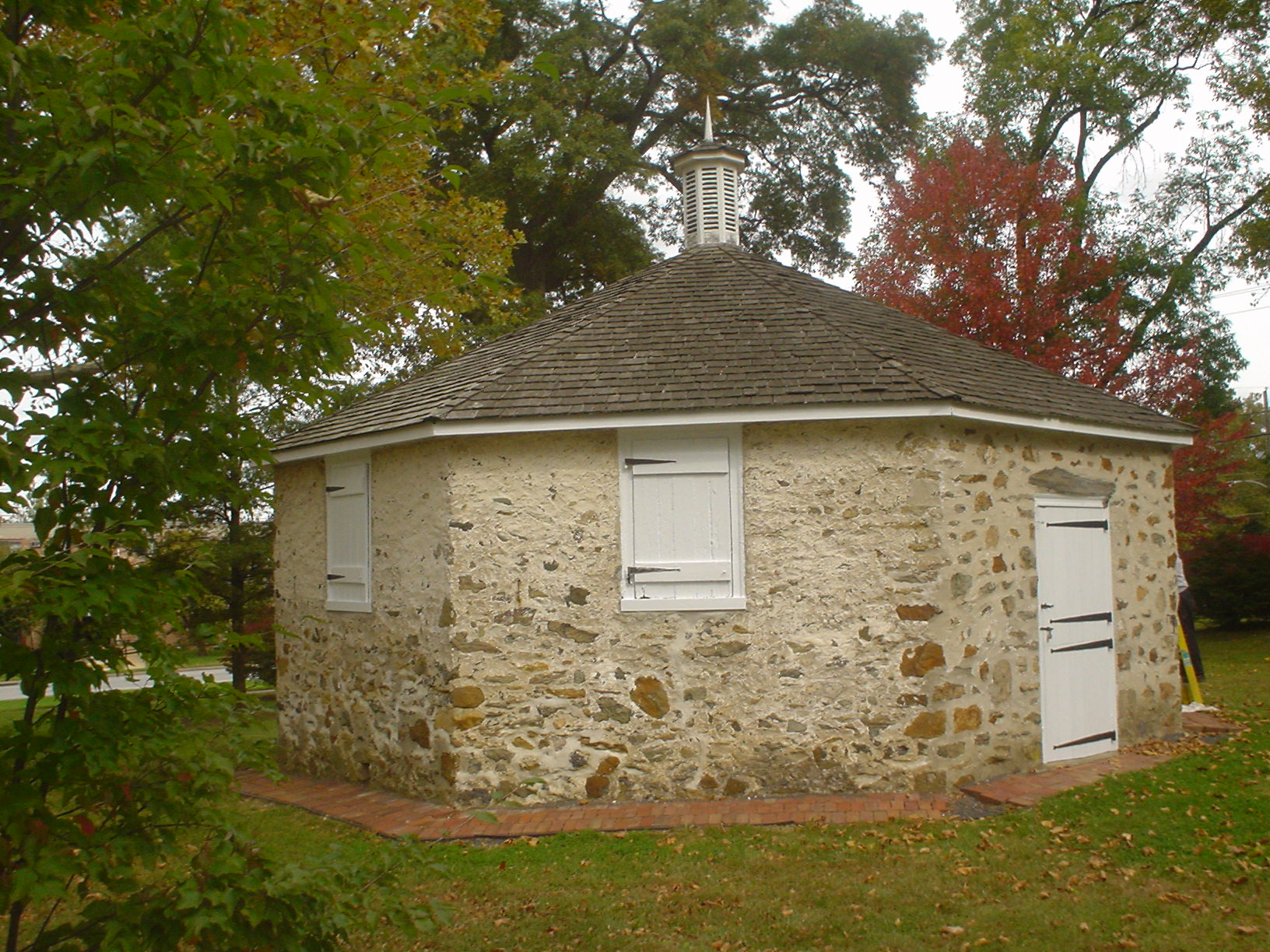
- Hood Octagonal School, October 2009

- Location within Pennsylvania Location within the United States
- Location: 3500 West Chester Pike, Newtown Square, Newtown Township, Pennsylvania
- Coordinates: 39°59′03″N 75°23′23″W
- Area: less than one acre
- Built: 1841
- Architect: Yarnall, Richard Ashbridge
- Architectural style: Octagon Mode
- NRHP reference No.: 06000045
- Added to NRHP: February 14, 2006

The Hood Octagonal School is an historic octagonal schoolhouse which is located in Newtown Township, Delaware County, Pennsylvania, United States.

It was added to the National Register of Historic Places in 2006.

== History and architectural features ==
Built in 1841, this historic school is a small, fieldstone, one-story, eight-sided building with a wood shingled pyramidal roof. The school was abandoned sometime around 1865, and was then restored in 1964.

Representatives of the Newtown Square Historical Society have stated that this school was built by James Dunwoody, the father of William Hood Dunwoody, to replace an earlier log school that had been built by James' father.
