= Octagon (disambiguation) =

An octagon is an eight-sided polygon.

Octagon may also refer to:

== Buildings and locations ==
- Octagon Barn (disambiguation)
- Octagon Building (disambiguation)
- Octagon Centre, at the University of Sheffield, England
- Octagon house, a unique house style
- Octagon House (disambiguation)
- Octagonal Schoolhouse (disambiguation)
- Octagon, Alabama
- Octagon, Birmingham, a skyscraper and the tallest building in Birmingham, England
- Octagon, Indiana
- Octagon, Virginia
- The Octagon (Egypt), the new headquarters of the Ministry of Defence (Egypt)

== Music ==
- Octagon (Bathory album), 1995
- Octagon (String Trio of New York album), 1994
- Octagon (Dilate album), 1997
- Octagon, Octagon, Octagon, a 2003 EP by The Mint Chicks

== People ==
- Octagón (born 1961), Mexican wrestler
- Dr. Octagon, an alter-ego of rapper Kool Keith

== Sports ==
- Octagon (mixed martial arts), the caged enclosure used for mixed martial arts bouts
- Octagon (sports agency), global sports and entertainment content marketing subsidiary
- Oktagon MMA, a European mixed martial arts organization based in Czechia and Slovakia
- Oktagon, an Italian mixed martial arts event

== Other ==
- Octagon (wine), a wine produced by Virginia wine producer Barboursville Vineyards
- Octagon (novel), a 1981 novel by Fred Saberhagen
- Second Quebec Conference, codenamed OCTAGON, meeting of the allied powers during World War II
- Octagonal (horse), champion Australian racehorse
- Octagon (video game), a minimalist twitch-reflex video game

== See also ==
- The Octagon (disambiguation)
- Octagon Theatre, Bolton, Greater Manchester, England
- Octagon Theatre, Perth, a theatre at the University of Western Australia
- Octagonal (disambiguation)
- Oktogon (disambiguation)
