= Octagon Building =

Octagon Building can refer to:

== Philippines ==
- Octagon (Ortigas Center), in Pasig, Metro Manila
- A building on the campus of Polytechnic University of the Philippines Santo Tomas

== United Kingdom ==
- Octagon, Birmingham, a residential skyscraper under construction in Birmingham, England
- The main building at University College London

== United States ==
- Octagon Building (Santa Cruz, California)
- Octagonal Building (Mexico), part of the Mexico exhibit at the 1884 World Cotton Centennial fair in New Orleans, Louisiana
- The Octagon at Amherst College, Massachusetts
- Andrew Gildersleeve Octagonal Building, Mattituck, New York
- The Octagon (Roosevelt Island), New York
- The Octagon (Heidelberg University), Tiffin, Ohio

== Elsewhere ==
- The Octagon (Egypt), defense headquarters for the Egyptian Ministry of Defense, in the New Administrative Capital, Egypt
- The Octagon, Christchurch, a former church in Christchurch, New Zealand

== See also ==
- Octagon barn (disambiguation)
- Octagon Centre
- Octagon Chapel (disambiguation)
- Octagonal churches in Norway
- Octagon Hall
- Octagon Hotel
- Octagon House (disambiguation)
- Octagonal Mausoleum
- Octagonal Schoolhouse (disambiguation)
- Octagon Theatre
- The Octagon (disambiguation)
- List of octagonal buildings and structures
