= The Octagon =

The Octagon may refer to:

- The Octagon, Christchurch, a former church in the central city of Christchurch, New Zealand
- The Octagon, Dunedin, the city centre of Dunedin, New Zealand
- The Octagon (Birmingham), residential tower in Birmingham, England
- The Octagon (Egypt), the headquarters of the Egyptian Ministry of Defense in the New Administrative Capital of Egypt
- The Octagon House, Washington, D.C.
- The Octagon (Heidelberg University), Tiffin, Ohio
- The Octagon (Roosevelt Island), New York
- The Octagon at Amherst College, Massachusetts
- The Octagon (film), a 1980 Chuck Norris movie
- The Octagon (album), a 2020 album by Australian rapper Chillinit
- The Octagon, the trademarked name for the enclosure in Ultimate Fighting Championship#Octagon mixed-martial-arts bouts

== See also ==
- Octagon (disambiguation)
- Octagon Building (disambiguation)
- Octagon Theatre, Bolton, Greater Manchester, England
- Octagon Theatre, Perth, a theatre at the University of Western Australia
