= Octagonal (disambiguation) =

Octagonal refers to the property of an object shaped like an octagon.

Octagonal may also refer to:

- 2022 FIFA World Cup qualification – CONCACAF third round, nicknamed the Octagonal
- Octagonal (horse) (1992–2016), New Zealand racehorse that raced in Australia
- Octagonal tiling
  - Truncated octagonal tiling
  - Truncated order-4 octagonal tiling
  - Order-6 octagonal tiling
  - Order-8 octagonal tiling
  - Truncated order-8 octagonal tiling
  - Snub octagonal tiling
- Octagonal number
  - Centered octagonal number
- Octagonal polyhedra
  - Octagonal prism
    - Octagonal antiprism
    - Octagonal prismatic prism
  - Octagonal bipyramid
    - Octagonal trapezohedron
- Octagonal polychoron
  - Octagonal antiprismatic prism
- List of octagonal buildings and structures
  - Octagonal barn (disambiguation)
  - Octagonal house
  - Octagonal School (disambiguation)
  - Octagonal Building (disambiguation)
  - Octagonal deadhouse

== See also ==
- Octagon (disambiguation)
