= Aguirre School =

School in Madrid, Spain

Escuelas Aguirre
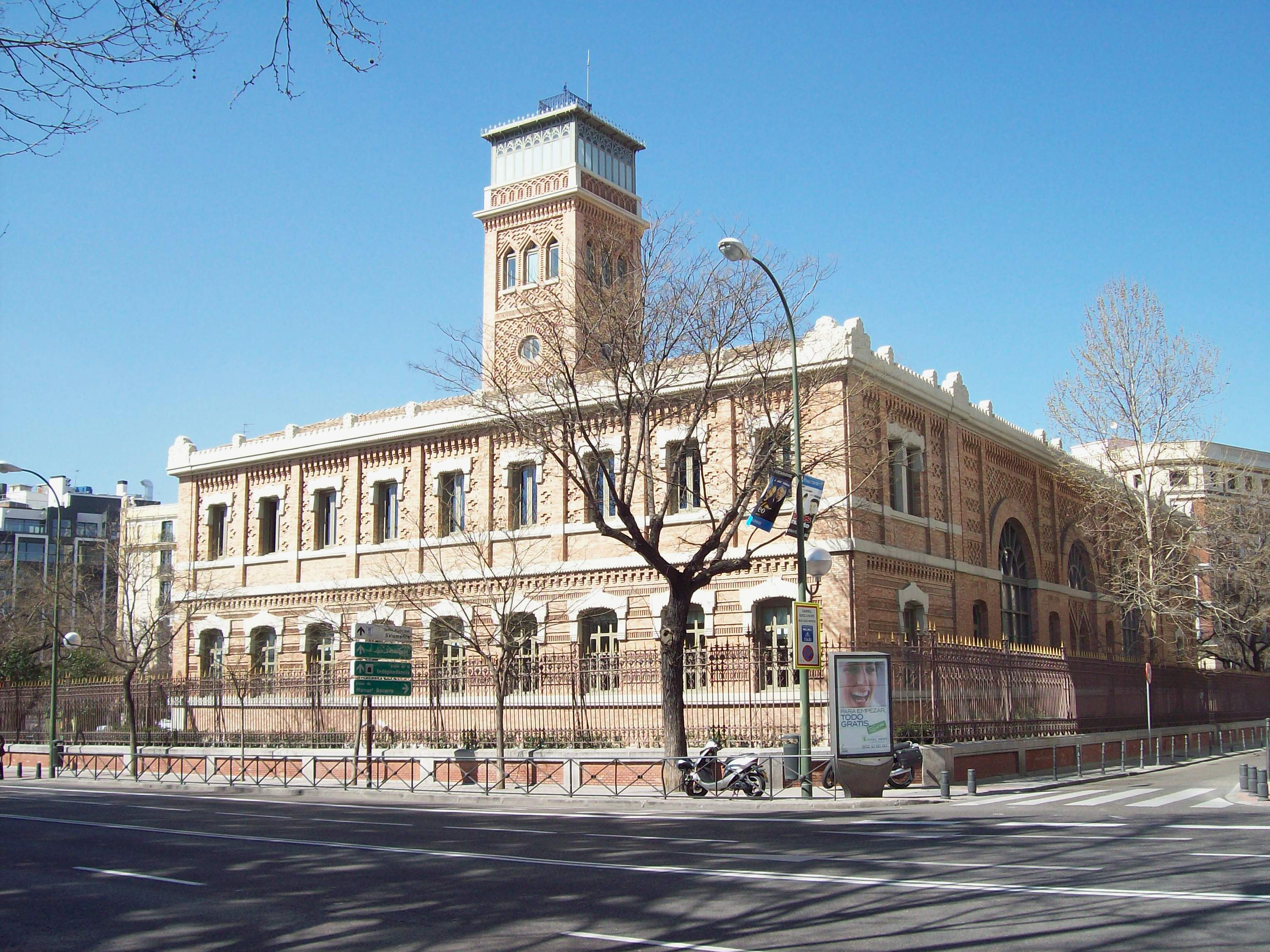
- Interactive map of the Escuelas Aguirre area

General information
- Location: Calle de Alcalá, 62, Madrid, Spain
- Coordinates: 40°25′18″N 3°40′54″W

Design and construction
- Architect: Emilio Rodríguez Ayuso

The Aguirre Schools (Spanish: Escuelas Aguirre) is a notable Neo-Mudéjar style building in Madrid, Spain. Located at Calle de Alcalá, 62, it is named after Lucas Aguirre, a Spanish philanthropist who left funds for the construction of schools. As the building has housed the Casa Árabe e Instituto Internacional de Estudios Árabes y del Mundo Musulmán since 2006, it is also currently known as the Casa Árabe ("Arabic House").

This Neo-Mudéjar style building was designed by Emilio Rodríguez Ayuso and built from 1881 to 1886. The same architect later added an enclosure (1887) and garden (1896–98). Subsequently architect Luis Bellido González performed alterations in 1908–1909 and 1929, with a third set of alterations and basement extension made by Antonio Flórez Urdapilleta and Bernardo Giner de los Ríos in 1932–1933.
