= Colonia Santa María la Ribera =

Santa María la Ribera
- Neighborhood of Mexico City
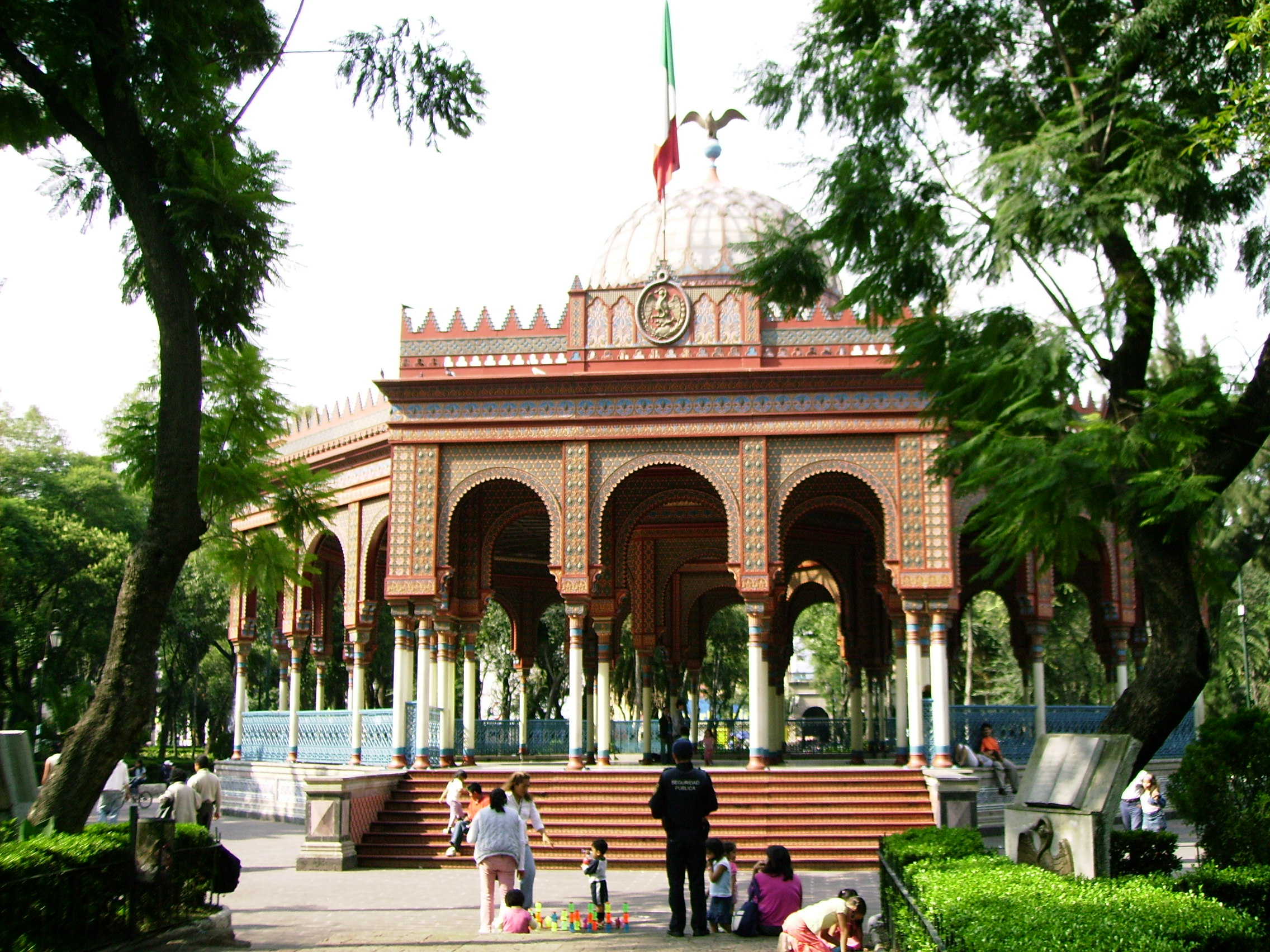
- Alameda de Santa María la Ribera. In the background lies the Morisco Kiosk

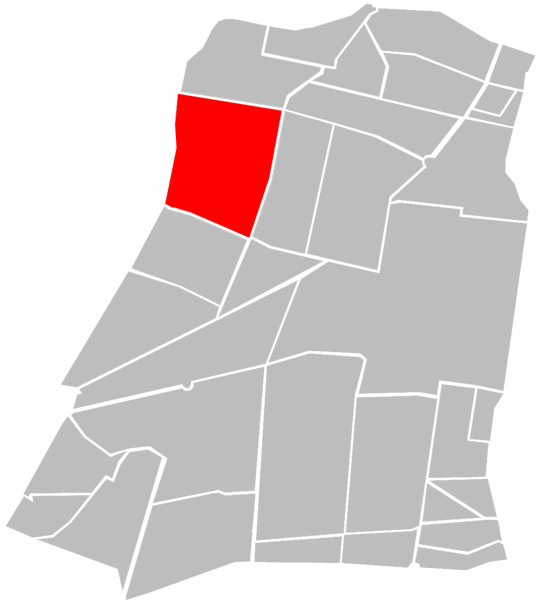
- Location of Colonia Obrera (in red) within Cuauhtémoc borough
- Coordinates: 19°26′57.68″N 99°9′26.19″W
- Country: Mexico
- City: Mexico City
- Borough: Cuauhtémoc

Population (2010)
  - Total: 40,960
- Postal code: 06400

Colonia Santa María la Ribera is a colonia located in the Cuauhtémoc borough of Mexico City, just west of the historic center. It was created in the late 19th century for the affluent who wanted homes outside of the city limits. The colonia reached its height between 1910 and 1930. In the 1930s, the middle class moved in and a new era of construction began. The colonia began to deteriorate in the 1950s, as the city grew around it and apartment buildings were constructed. Since the 1985 Mexico City earthquake, poorer residents have moved in and economic housing has been constructed. Today, the colonia is a mix of old mansions and homes (with over 1,000 categorized as having architectural or historic value), small shops and businesses, tenements and abandoned buildings. The colonia has one major park and two museums. This area was designated as a "Barrio Mágico" by the city in 2011.

== Location ==
The neighborhood is bordered by:

- Av. Ricardo Flores Magón on the north, across which is Colonia Atlampa
- Circuito Interior Avenida Instituto Técnico Industrial on the west, across which is Colonia Agricultura in the Miguel Hidalgo borough
- Av. Ribera de San Cosme on the south, across which is Colonia San Rafael
- Avenida de los Insurgentes Norte on the east, across which is Colonia Buenavista

== Description ==
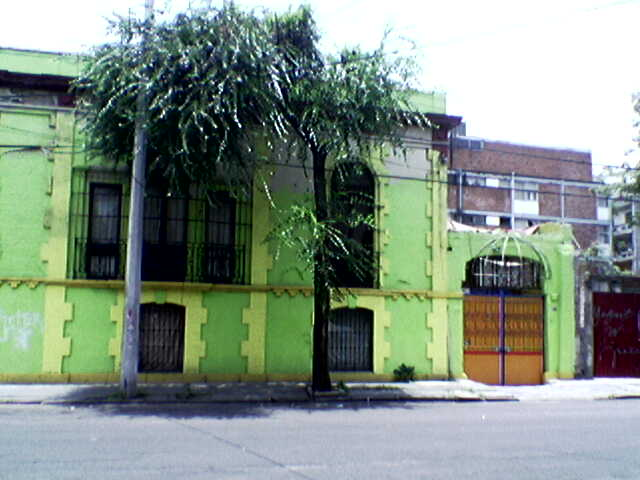
An old house recently painted. Santa María la Ribera, Mexico.

The colonia's borders are marked by the following streets: Avenue Ricardo Flores Magon to the north, Ribera de San Cosme to the south, Insurgentes Norte to the east and Circuito Interior to the west. It consists of 116 city blocks located just west of the historic center of the city.

While the neighborhood was established as an upper class country getaway over 100 years ago, today, it is fully absorbed into Mexico City's center. The oldest structures are mansions from the late 19th century. These and a number of buildings built until about 1930 make up the 1,040 structures which are considered to have architectural and historical value cataloged by the Instituto Nacional de Bellas Artes. Structures built since that time have been for the lower classes such as apartment buildings. Older buildings have also been converted into apartments, tenements and businesses as well.

The neighborhood has a mix of middle and lower class residents, as well as squatters and homeless. The colonia is considered to be a traditional neighborhood, where family owned businesses mix with old houses and monuments. There is a problem with abandoned properties including 25 that are registered as architectural landmarks. Older residents tend to have extremely low frozen rents, which inhibits the care of older buildings. In a number of cases, historically valuable buildings have simply been demolished to make way for new condos.

== Landmarks ==
The center of the colonia is the Alameda Park with its Morisco Kiosk, located at the intersection of Dr. Atl and Salvador Miron Streets, near Metro Buenavista. The kiosk was designed and built in the late 19th century by José Ramón Ibarrola to be the Mexico Pavilion at the World's Fair of 1884 in New Orleans and of the Saint Louis Exposition of 1902. The structure is completely made of cast iron, which was in fashion at that time. It is thought that the iron came from the Carnegie Steel Company of Pittsburgh. It consists of panels that can be disassembled and a glass cupola. After these events, the structure was brought back to Mexico at the beginning of the 20th century and installed on the south side of the Alameda Central. While it was here, it became the site of the national lottery drawing. For the Centennial of the Mexican War of Independence, the kiosk was moved to make way for the Benito Juárez Monument. The residents of the colonia petitioned to have the kiosk moved to this neighborhood.

Since then, a number of myths about the kiosk have been created, such as that it was donated by an Arab chieftain and that the kiosk has astrological and magical aspects due to its octagonal shape and large number of geometrical decorations. Over time, the kiosk deteriorated due to lack of maintenance and even the robbery of pieces. In 2003, the kiosk was completely restored by the McCartney International company, in a three-month effort that involved 85 people. The restoration included stripping old layers of paint, repairing damage and painting the kiosk in its original colors. Modern additions include film to block ultraviolet rays in the cupola and a Teflon coating to protect against acid rain. A number of pieces of the original kiosk had broken off over time and many of these wound up in private homes. Many were recovered as part of the restoration project.

The kiosk and park host cultural activities such as popular bands, chamber orchestras and dance classes. It was named an Artistic Monument of the Nation by the INAH in 1972.

On one side of the park is the Geology Institute on Jaime Bodet Street. This is a sober completed in 1906 as one of the many projects mandated by Porfirio Díaz to celebrate the Centennial of Mexico's independence. Today, the Institute is part of UNAM. It contains a collection of fossils, minerals, flora and fauna from various parts of the world and a small collection of landscapes done by José María Velasco. The building is Art Nouveau and has stained glass windows with typical Mexican scenery. Its facade is made of sandstone and contains reliefs of shell and reptile fossils.

The Museo Universitario del Chopo or Chopo University Museum is an Art Nouveau ironwork and glass construction, which stands out due to its two large metal towers. Due to its appearance, it has been nicknamed the Palacio de Cristal or the Crystal Palace, due to is similarity with the structure in England. Much of the metal and glasswork is from Germany and created in 1902. Then it was brought piece by piece to Mexico. From 1913 to 1964, the building was the site of the Museo Nacional de Historia Natural (National Natural History Museum). The most famous exhibit of this museum was a large dinosaur bone. In the 1960s, it remained abandoned and was almost sold as scrap. In 1975, the museum underwent major reconstructive work for two years and then was re-inaugurated as the Museo Universitario del Chopo. Today it specializes in modern art and experimental projects for marginalized groups and young artists. It is located on Dr. Enrique Gonzalez Martinez Street.

Casa de Mascarones was a residence from the 17th century that belonged to the Counts of the Valle de Orizaba. it is located on the Ribera de San Cosme, which was the principle road connecting Mexico City with then-separate Tacuba in early colonial times. Until the late 19th century, this area was country side and in the mid 19th century, a number of the very wealthy built country homes here. The Casa de Mascarones was the summer home of the Valle de Orizaba family with their official home being the Casa de Azulejos in the historic center. Today, the Casa de Mascarones belongs to UNAM.

== History ==
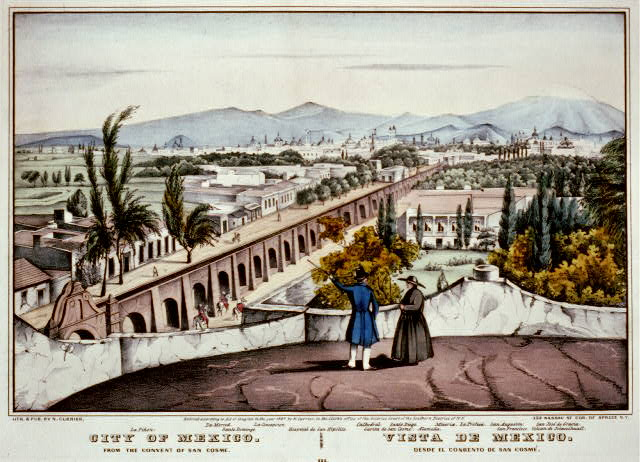
A view of the City of Mexico from the convent of San Cosme. A work of N. Currier.

In the pre-Hispanic period, this area was under a very shallow area of Lake Texcoco and uninhabited. After the Spanish conquest of Tenochtitlan, and soon after the Spanish retraced this island city into Mexico City, the area proved to be too small for the growing population. Various projects were begun to start draining Lake Texcoco and claim more land from the former lakebed starting in 1545 under viceroy Antonio de Mendoza. The first areas to dry sufficiently for habitation were north and west of the city, where Colonia Santa María, Colonia Guerrero and others are now. New streets and neighborhoods were eventually constructed such as Calzada de Tabaqueros (Tobacco Road) which is now Ribera de San Cosme. These lands did not become part of Mexico City, rather they became farms and lands associated with monasteries. The colonia's land was part of a hacienda called Hacienda de la Teja. In the mid 19th century, especially under Benito Juárez, haciendas and church lands were confiscated by the government and eventually broken into smaller farms and ranches. The colonia then was part of a farm called Rancho de Santa María. In the late 19th century, many of these same smaller farms and ranches were broken up again into housing subdivisions as Mexico City began to grow outside of its traditional confines.

The Santa María la Ribera development was created out of lands acquired by the Flores family. The area was one of the first planned subdivisions of the city, with spaces set aside for a park, a church and a market. Although considered old today, it was one of the first "modern" colonias created north and west of Mexico City in the late 19th century. The first houses of the subdivision were constructed along Ribera de San Cosme.

From 1860 to 1930, the area was home to the wealthy, with either country homes or later, city homes, but all large with spacious gardens. At the time of the celebration of Mexico's Centennial in 1910, wealthy residents competed to outdo each other in decoration and events. Some went as far as having exotic animals in their gardens. The Mexican Revolution caused a backlash against the wealthy of the city, and in some cases, residents of this neighborhood had to flee their properties, but the area still remained affluent during the first third of the 20th century. In the first half of the 20th century, several exclusive schools operated in the colonia, such as the Frances de San Cosme. This school was located on Santa María la Ribera Street from 1904 to 1959. The school was run by the sisters of the Saint Joseph of Lyon order of France. It was a girls' school, whose students were referred to as "fine mares" ("les jeunes filles" in French/ "yeguas finas" in Spanish) by the nuns. However, the term was not meant literally but rather as "young miss."

From 1910 to 1930, the colonia was at its height. In the 1920s, the La Rosa trolley passed through here connecting the area with the Zócalo in the city center. However, in the 1930s, the middle class consisting of small business owners, professionals and government employees began to move in, and building in the colonia accelerated. However, these newer homes were still private family homes, with one or two stories, small central courtyards and eclectic decorative details on the windows and doors. New religious constructions included the Josefinos Church in Byzantine style and the Espiritu Santo Parish with its sumptuous roof decoration.

By the 1950s, the city had grown extensively around the colonia. It was bordered to the north by an industrial zone with the trains of the Buenavista station to the east and the new campus of the National Polytechnic Institute to the west. Wealthy residents began to move out and towards newer colonias to the west. Lower classes began to move in with apartment buildings and other co-housing either built from scratch or created by transforming the older mansions. Stage and movie theaters became venues for popular shows and films, with the Rivoli and Majestic theaters eventually closing and demolished. The city's first mall was eventually constructed at the site of the latter theater.

The next wave of new residents was a result of the 1985 Mexico City earthquake. While the structures of the colonia were not heavily affected, the area received a large influx of others from more affected areas. This increased the population, but it also increased pressure to build more affordable housing. Since that time a number of groups representing the poor have pushed for more affordable housing in the area. This has created conflict with older residents who wish to retain the older mansions and other constructions as well as the more traditional feel of the colonia. The Instituto de Vivienda de Distrito Federal has built low income housing in the colonia, both to increase the number of area residents as to provide housing to those with scarce resources. Thirty seven of these new constructions were built in the early 2000s and have led to complaints that they do not fit in with many of the traditional structures.

The influx of lower income resident has caused much of the middle class to leave and many properties abandoned. This has brought in squatters and homeless and the colonia continues to deteriorate. Today, the colonia has one of the highest crime rates in the city. The crime problems in this colonia and others such as Colonia Atlampa and Colonia San Rafael had become so bad, especially drug dealing, that the city expropriated a number of properties. In Santa Maria, three properties on Eligio Ancona and Sor Juana Inés de la Cruz streets were taken. The city has plans to convert at least one of the properties into a youth drug rehabilitation center.

== Transportation ==
=== Public transportation ===
The area is served by the Mexico City Metro and Metrobús. While it is not located in the neighborhood, Buenavista metro station is within walking distance.

Metro stations

- San Cosme

Metrobus stations

- Revolución
- El Chopo
- Buenavista
