= Neo-Mudéjar =

Type of Moorish Revival architecture

Neo-Mudéjar is a type of Moorish Revival architecture practised in the Iberian Peninsula and to a far lesser extent in Ibero-America. This architectural movement emerged as a revival of Mudéjar style. It was an architectural trend of the late 19th and early 20th centuries that began in Madrid and Barcelona and quickly spread to other regions in Spain and Portugal. It used Mudéjar style elements such as the horseshoe arch, arabesque tiling, and abstract shaped brick ornamentations for the façades of modern buildings.

== History ==
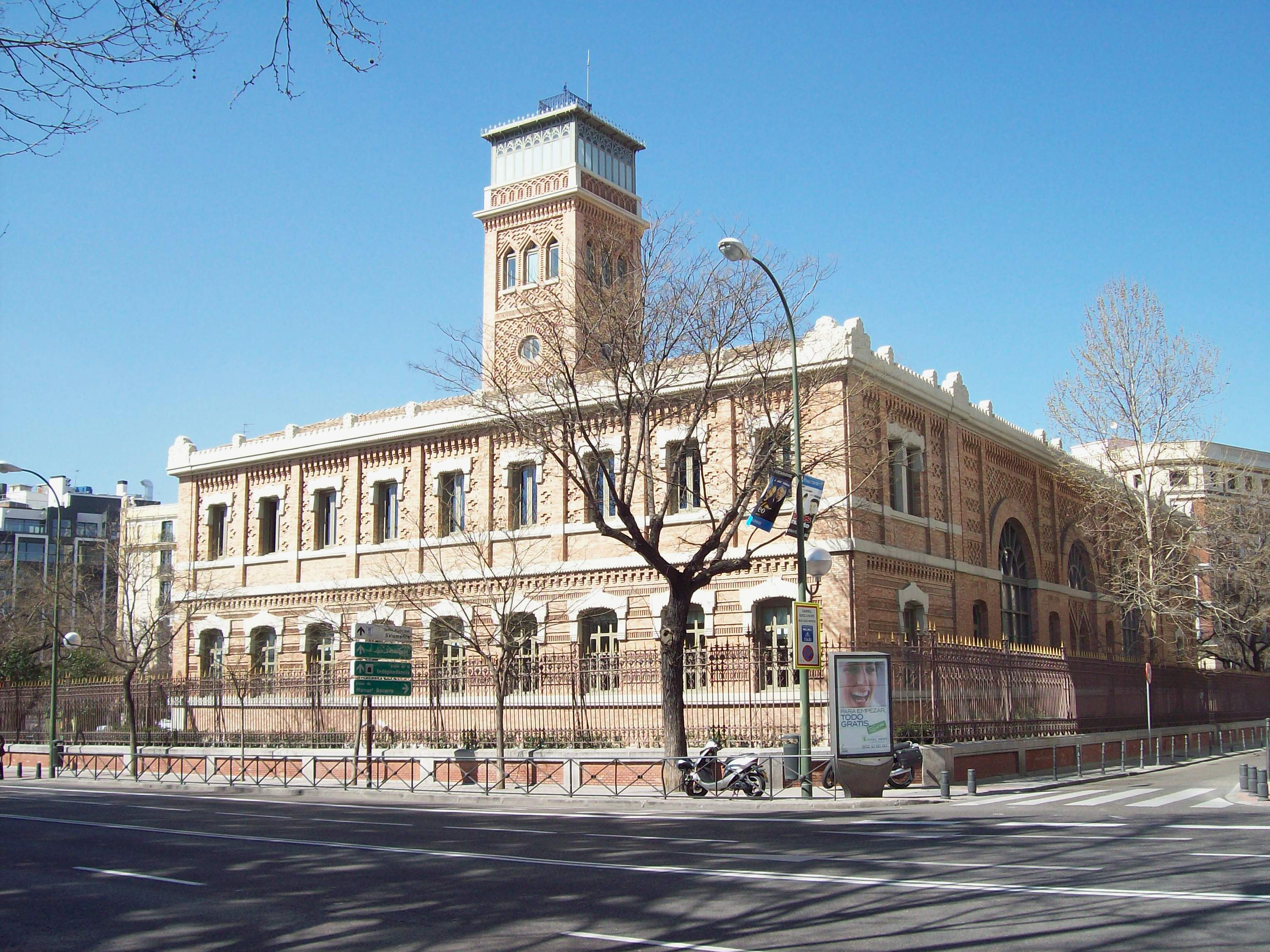
The Aguirre School (now the Casa Árabe)

The first examples of Neo-Mudéjar buildings were the Aguirre School designed by Rodríguez Ayuso, the Plaza de Toros in Madrid built in 1874 (now demolished), and the Casa Vicens by Antoni Gaudí i Cornet. The style then became almost "compulsory" for the construction of bullfight rings all around Spain, Portugal and the Hispanoamerican countries. In Madrid it became one of its most representative styles of the period, not only for public buildings, like the Aguirre School or the bullring of Las Ventas, but also for housing. The use of cheap materials, mainly brick for exteriors, made it a popular style in new neighborhoods.

Neo-Mudéjar was often combined with Neo-Gothic by architects such as Francisco de Cubas, Antonio María Repullés y Vargas and Francisco Jareño. After the Ibero-American Exposition of 1929 in Seville, another stream of Neo-Mudéjar features appeared known as Andalusian Architectural Regionalism. The Plaza de España (Seville) or the ABC newspaper headquarters (Madrid) are examples of this new style that combined traditional Andalusian architecture with Mudéjar features.

== List of notable Neo-Mudéjar buildings ==
- Arenas de Barcelona
- Gran Teatro Falla, Cádiz
- Las Ventas bullring, Madrid
- Casa Vicens, Barcelona
- Monserrate Palace, Sintra
- Church of Santa Cruz, Madrid
- Palacete Conceição e Silva, Lisbon
- Church of La Paloma, Madrid
- Quinta do Relógio, Sintra
- Water tower (now exhibition space) Torre de Canal Isabel II, in Madrid.
- Escuelas Aguirre, Madrid
- Pena Palace, Sintra
- Toledo railway station
- Nazaré Bullring, Nazaré
- Zaragoza Post-Office
- Campo Pequeno bullring, Lisbon
- Morisco Kiosk, Mexico City
- Palacio de Orleans-Borbón (now city hall), Sanlúcar de Barrameda
- Palacio de Doña Trinidad Grund (now town hall), Carratraca
- Hotel Alfonso XIII, Seville

== Gallery ==
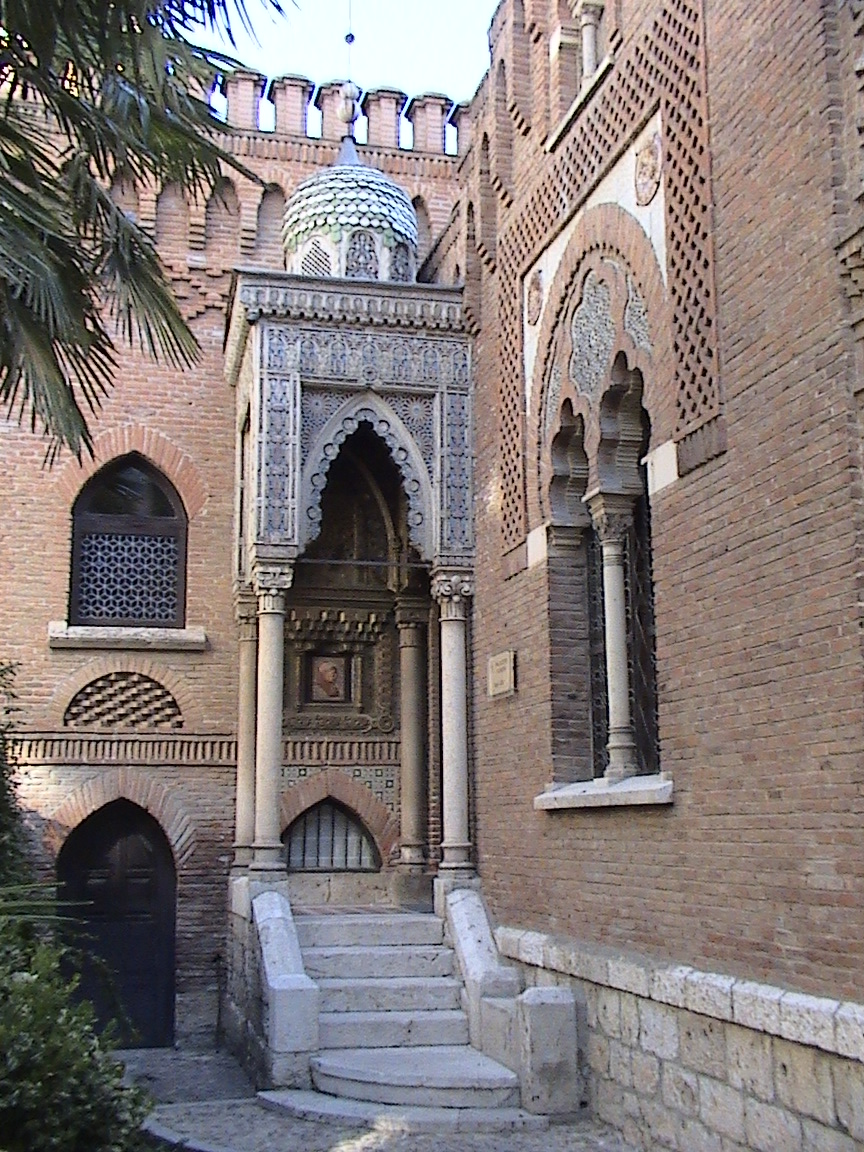
Palacio Laredo in Alcalá de Henares, 1884

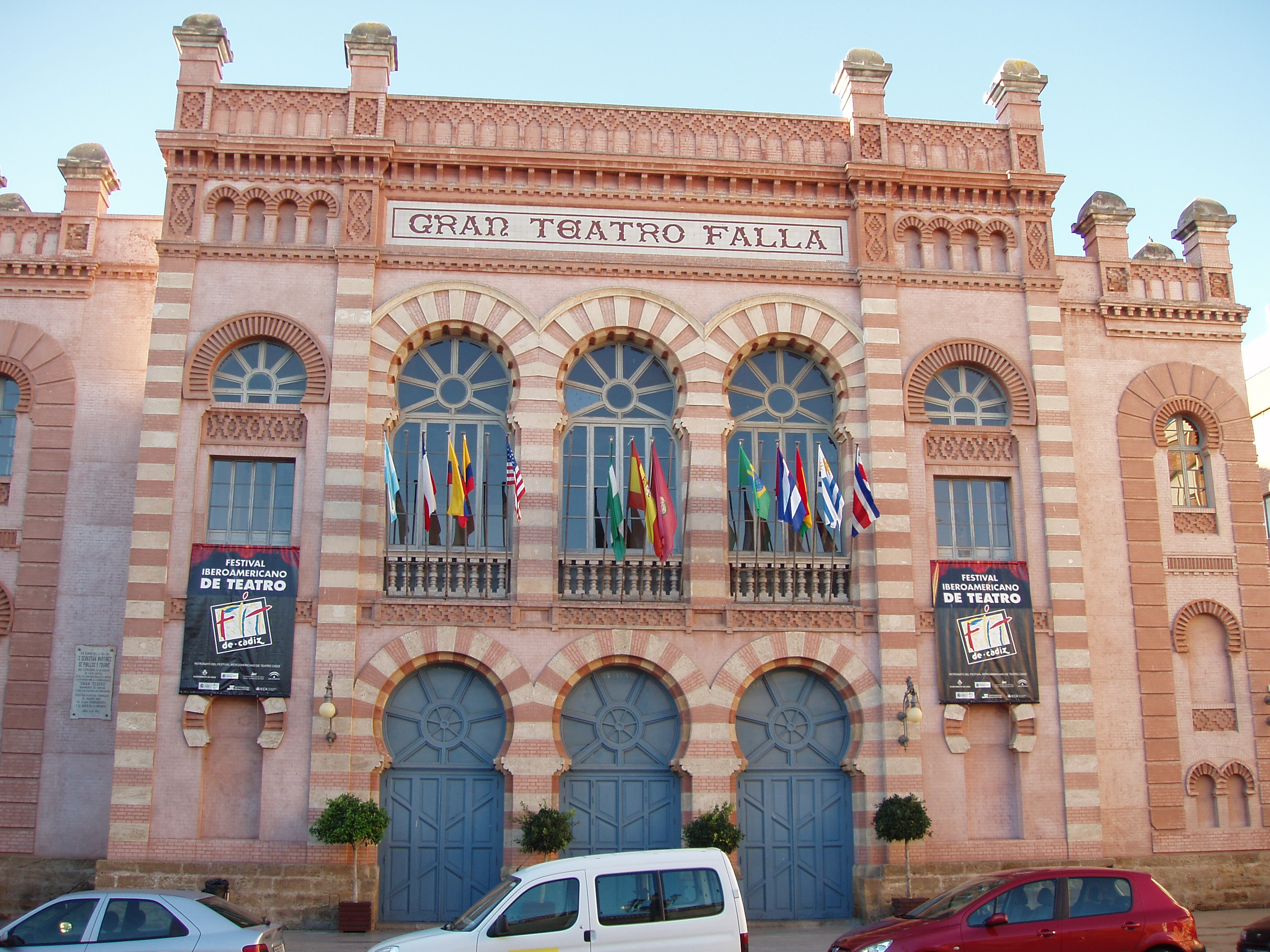
Gran Teatro Falla of Cádiz, 1884

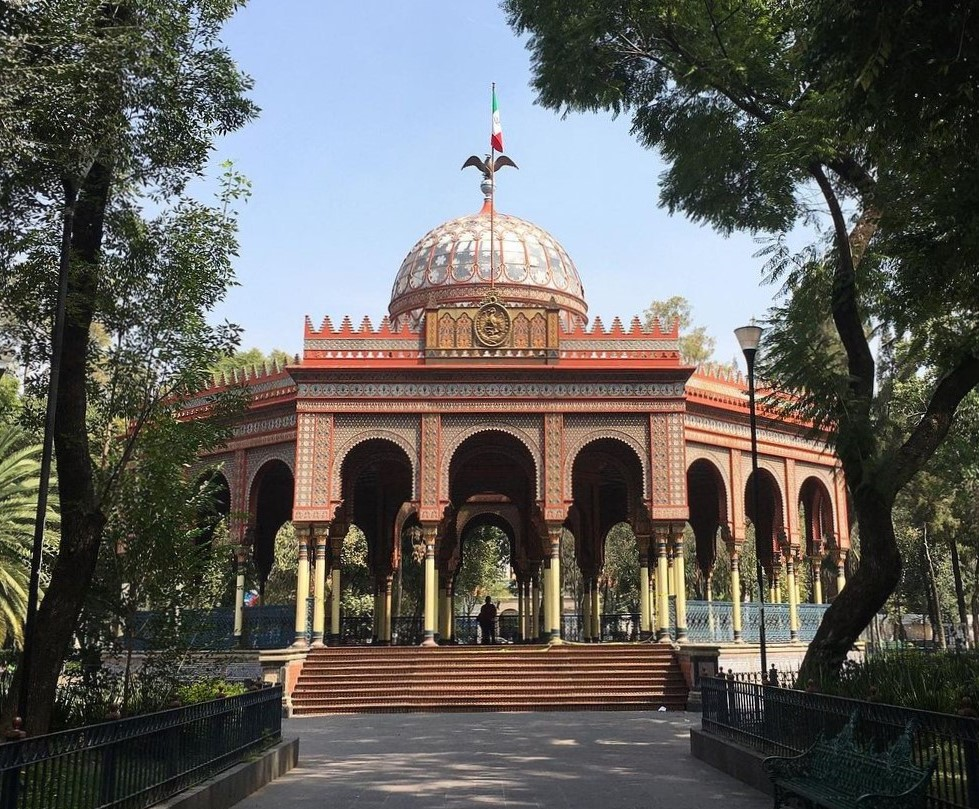
Morisco Kiosk, Mexico City, 1884

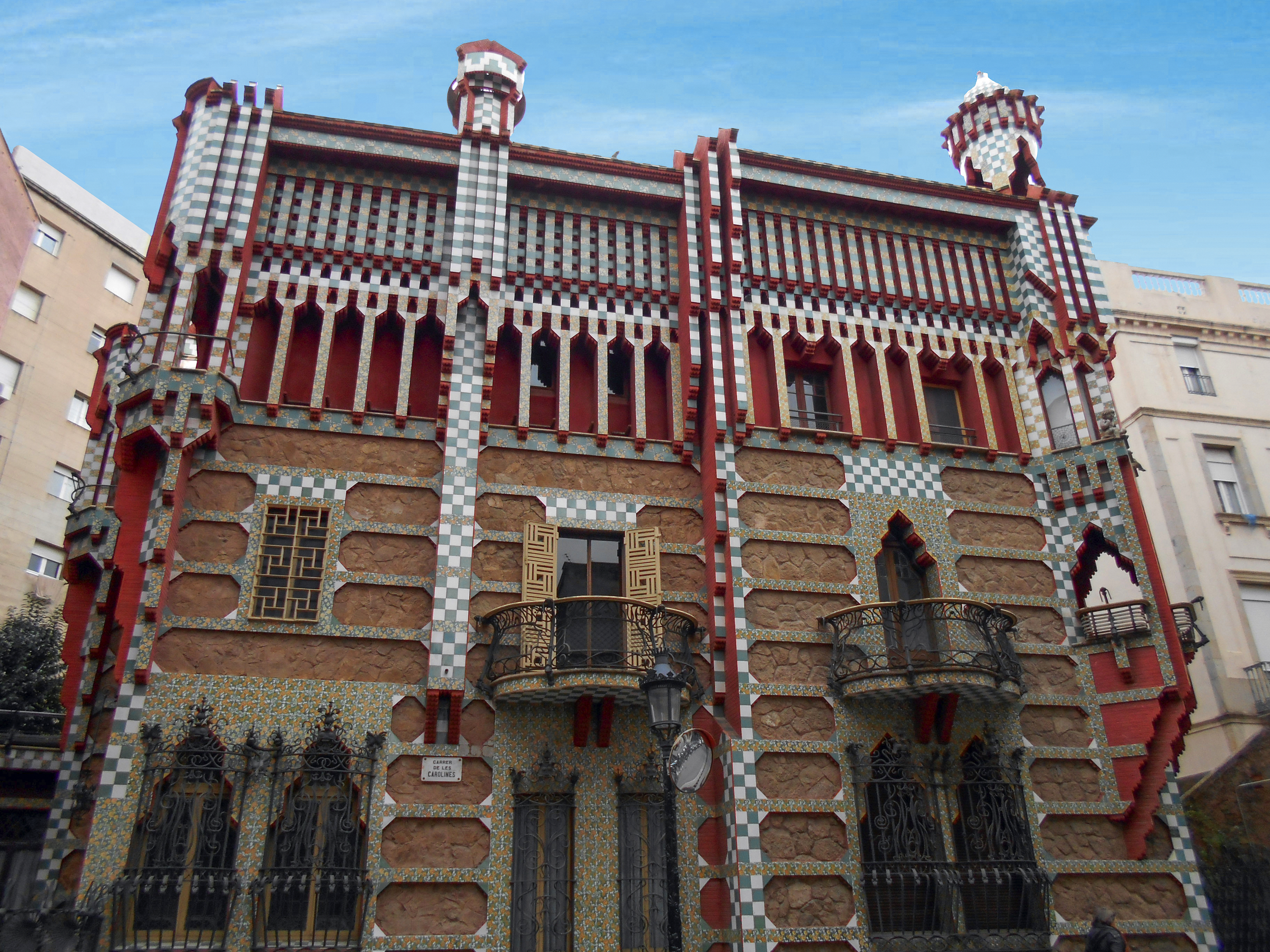
Casa Vicens, Barcelona, 1885

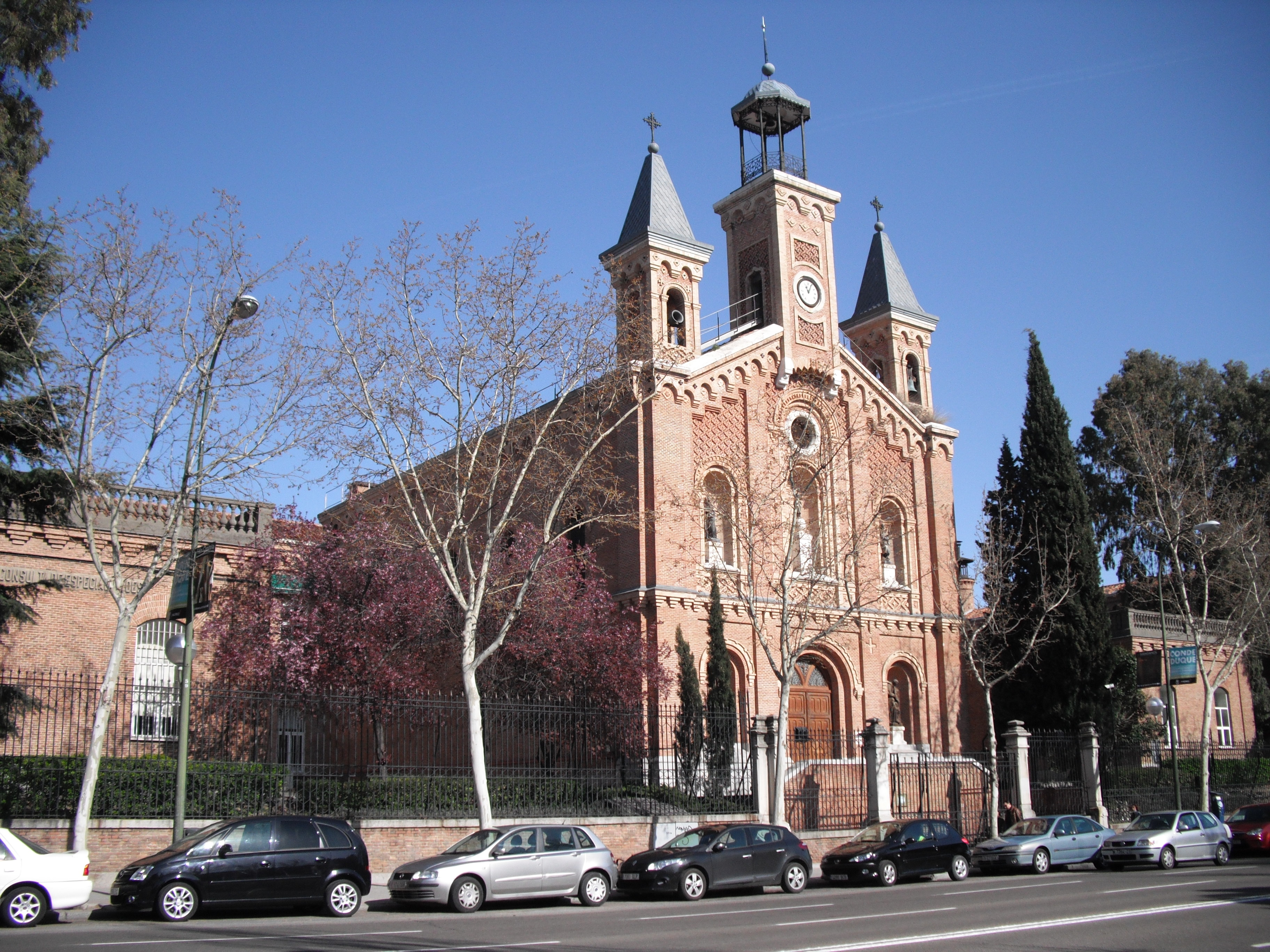
Church of Niño Jesús in Madrid, by Francisco Jareño, 1885

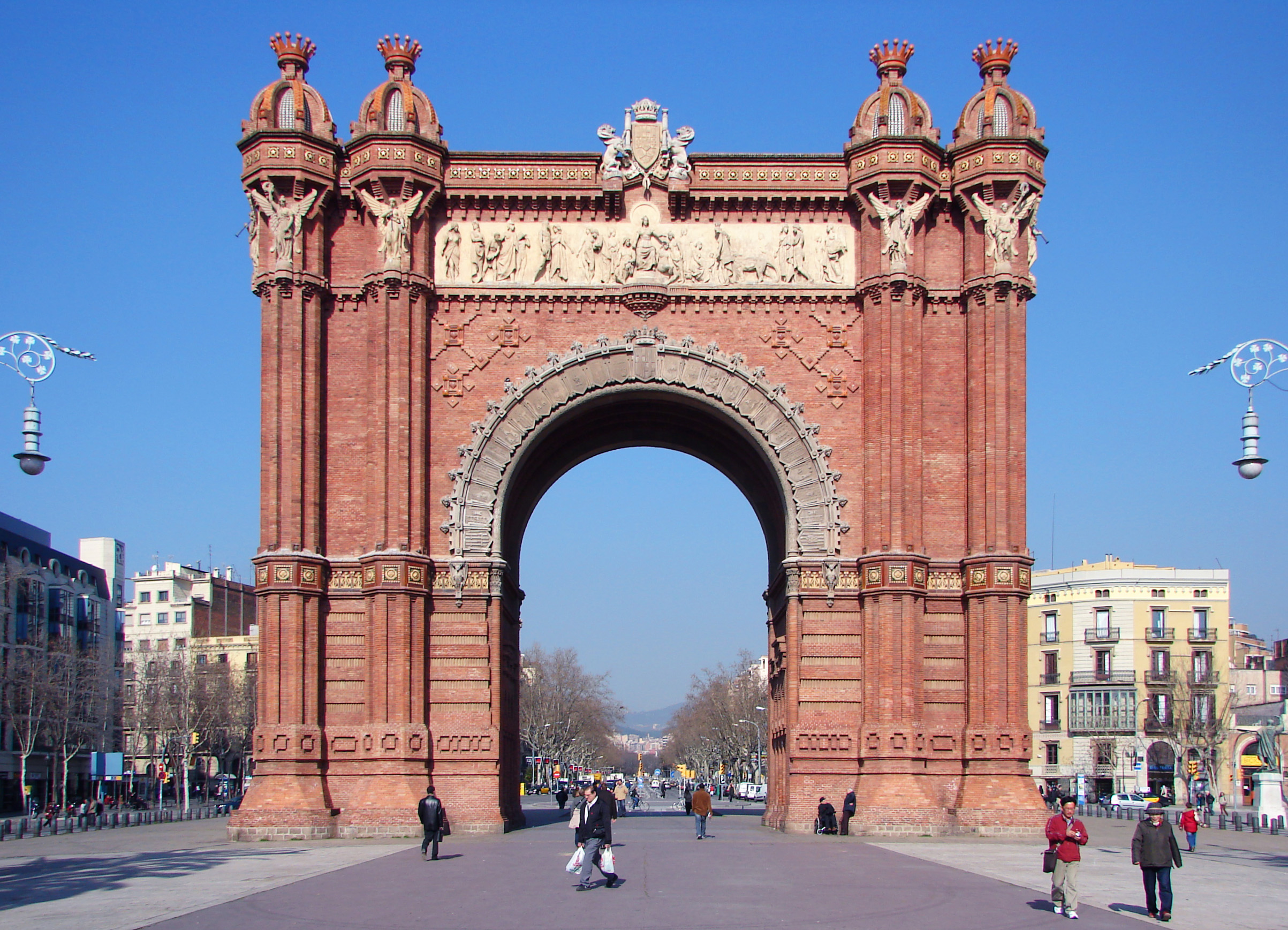
Arc de Triomf, Barcelona, 1888

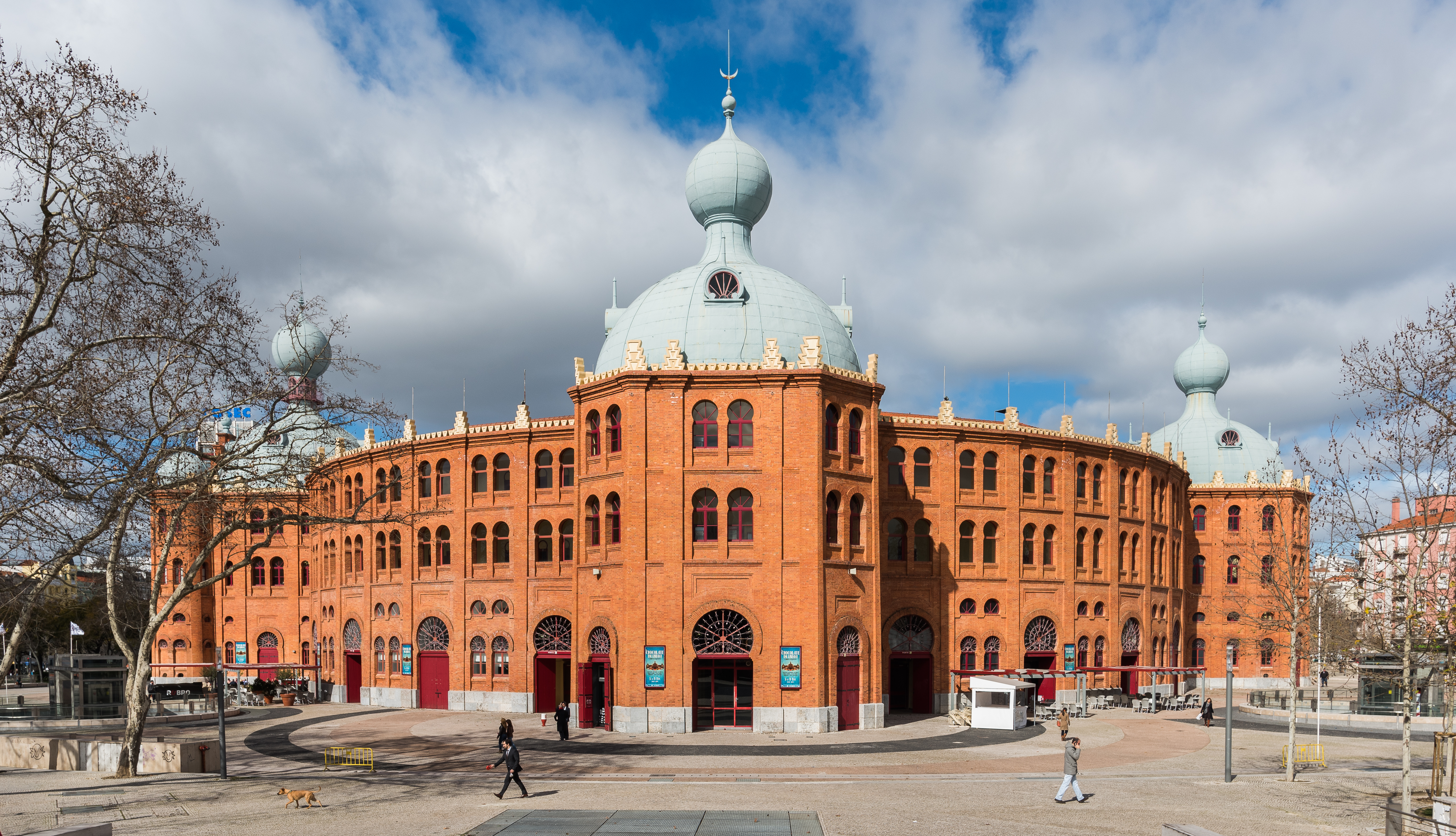
Campo Pequeno bullring in Lisbon (Portugal), 1892

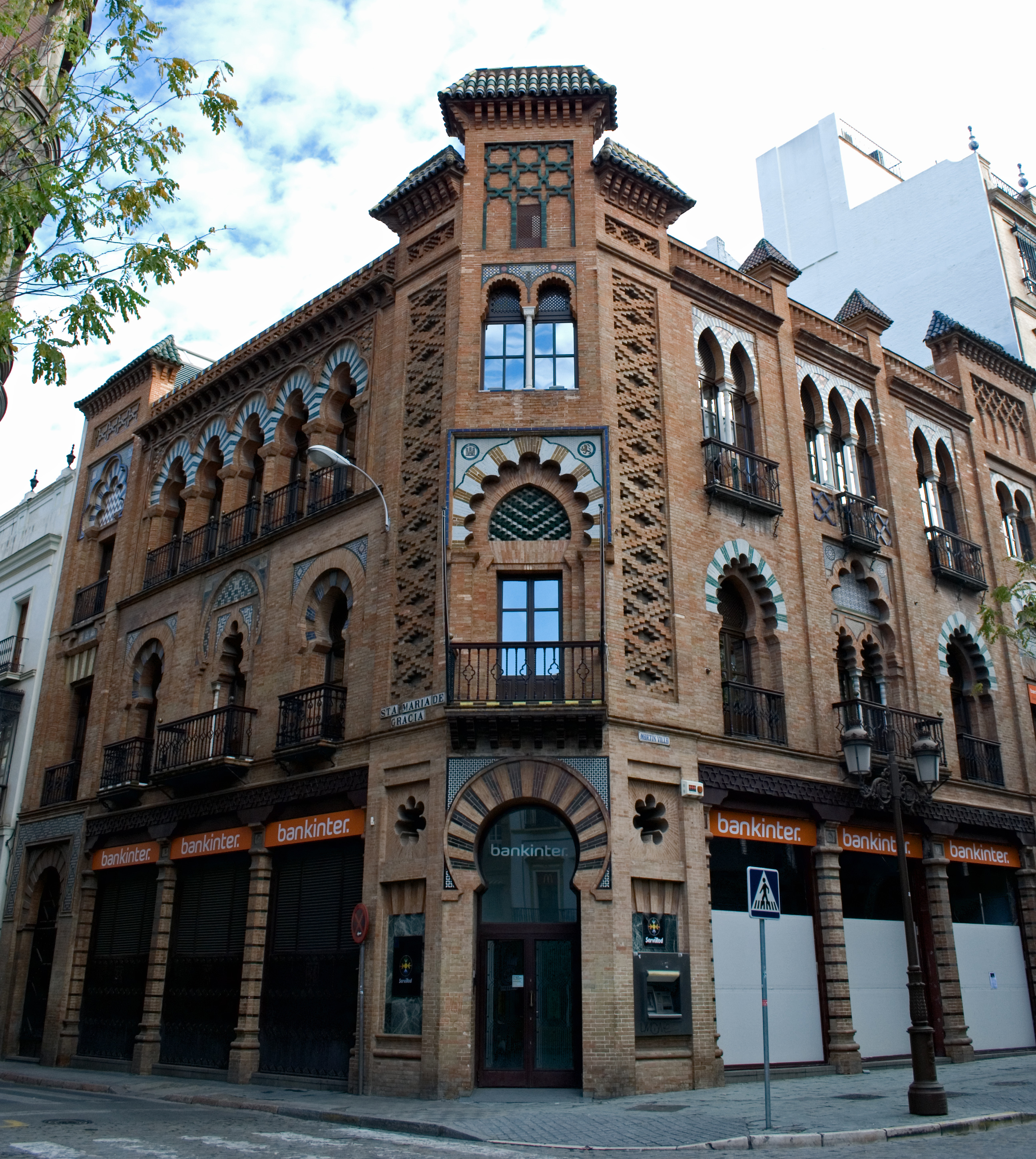
Neo-Mudéjar building in Seville, 1909

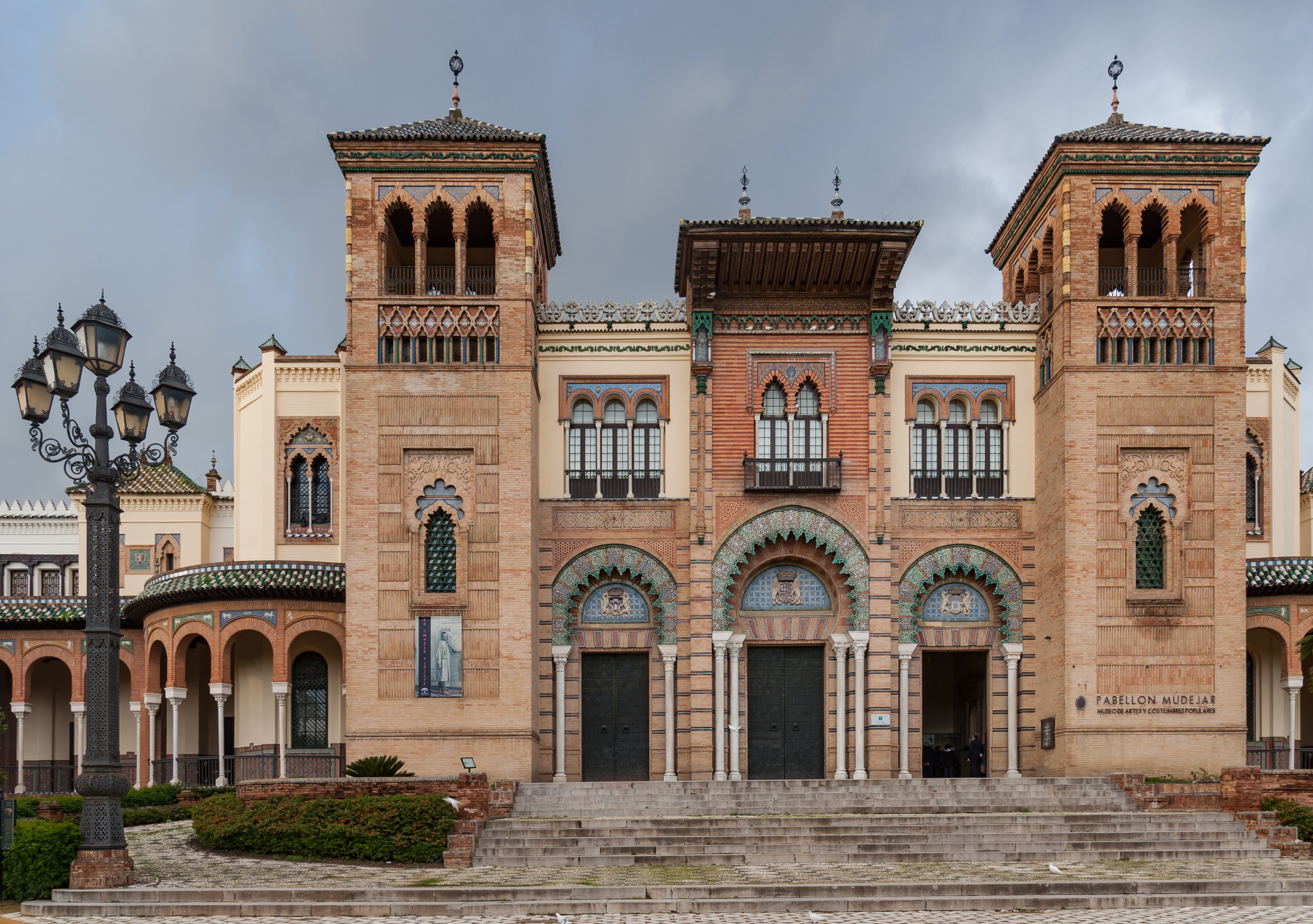
Mudéjar Pavilion, Museum of Arts and Traditions, Seville, 1914

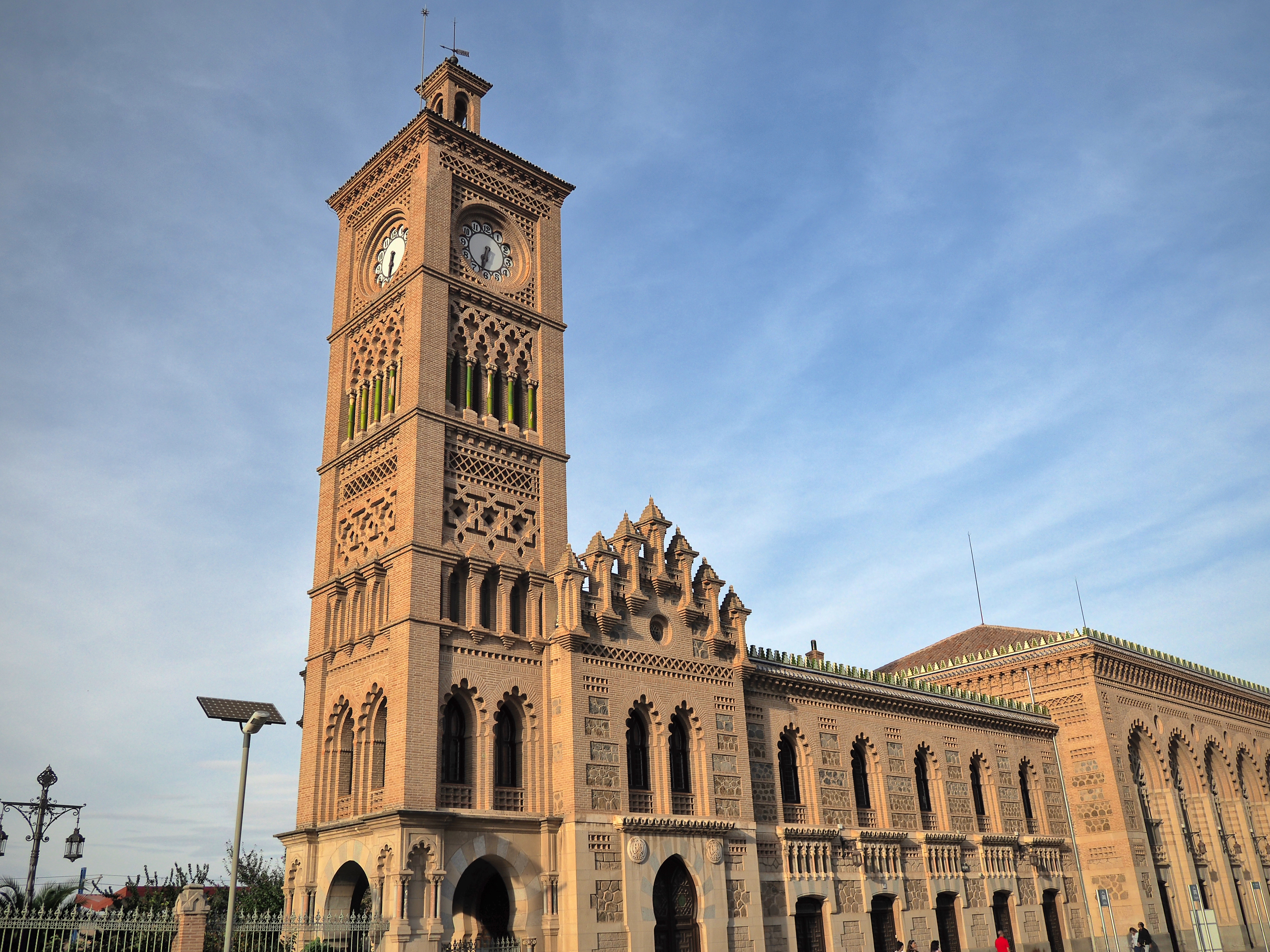
The Toledo railway station, 1919

The Toledo railway station, 1919

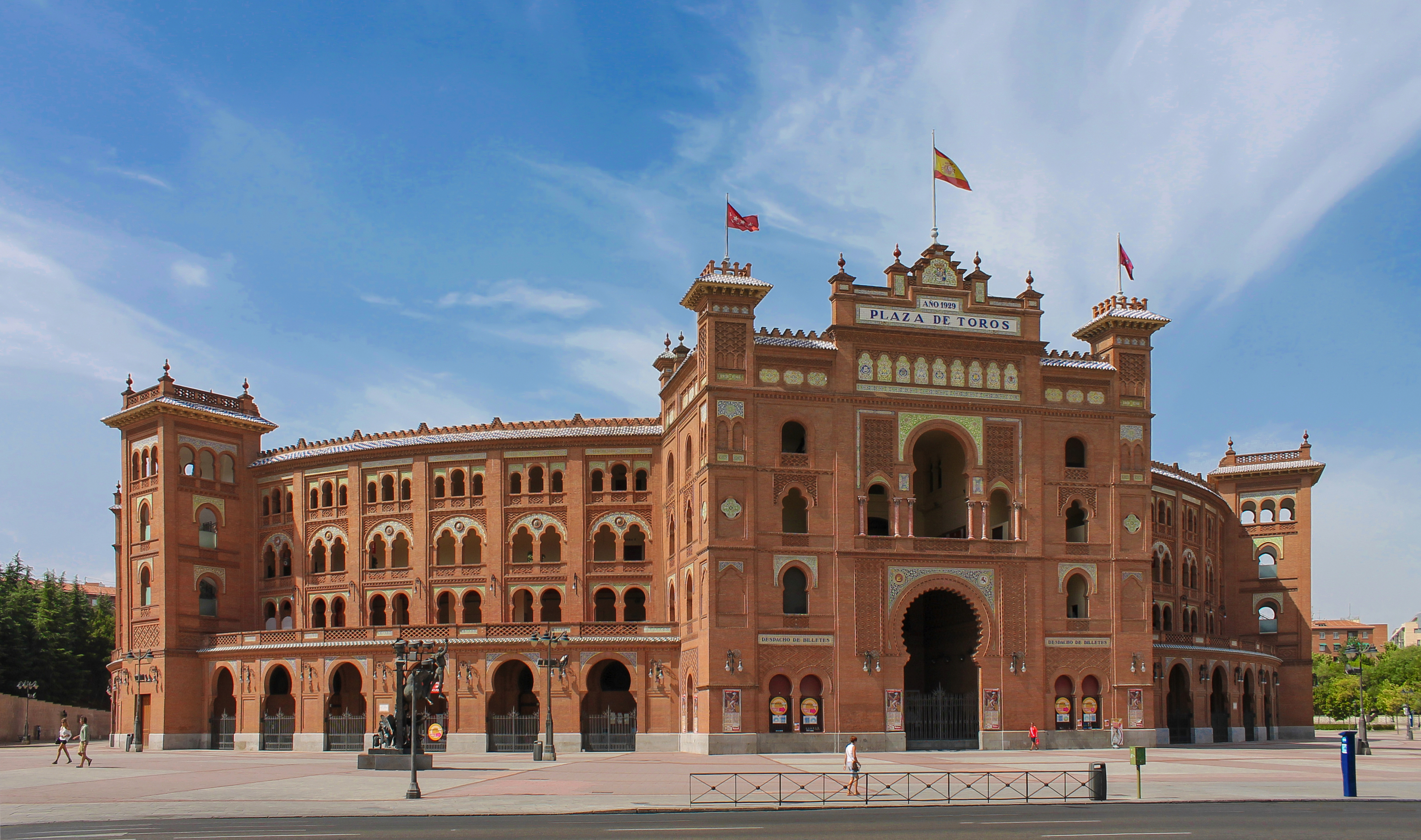
Las Ventas bullring, Madrid, 1929

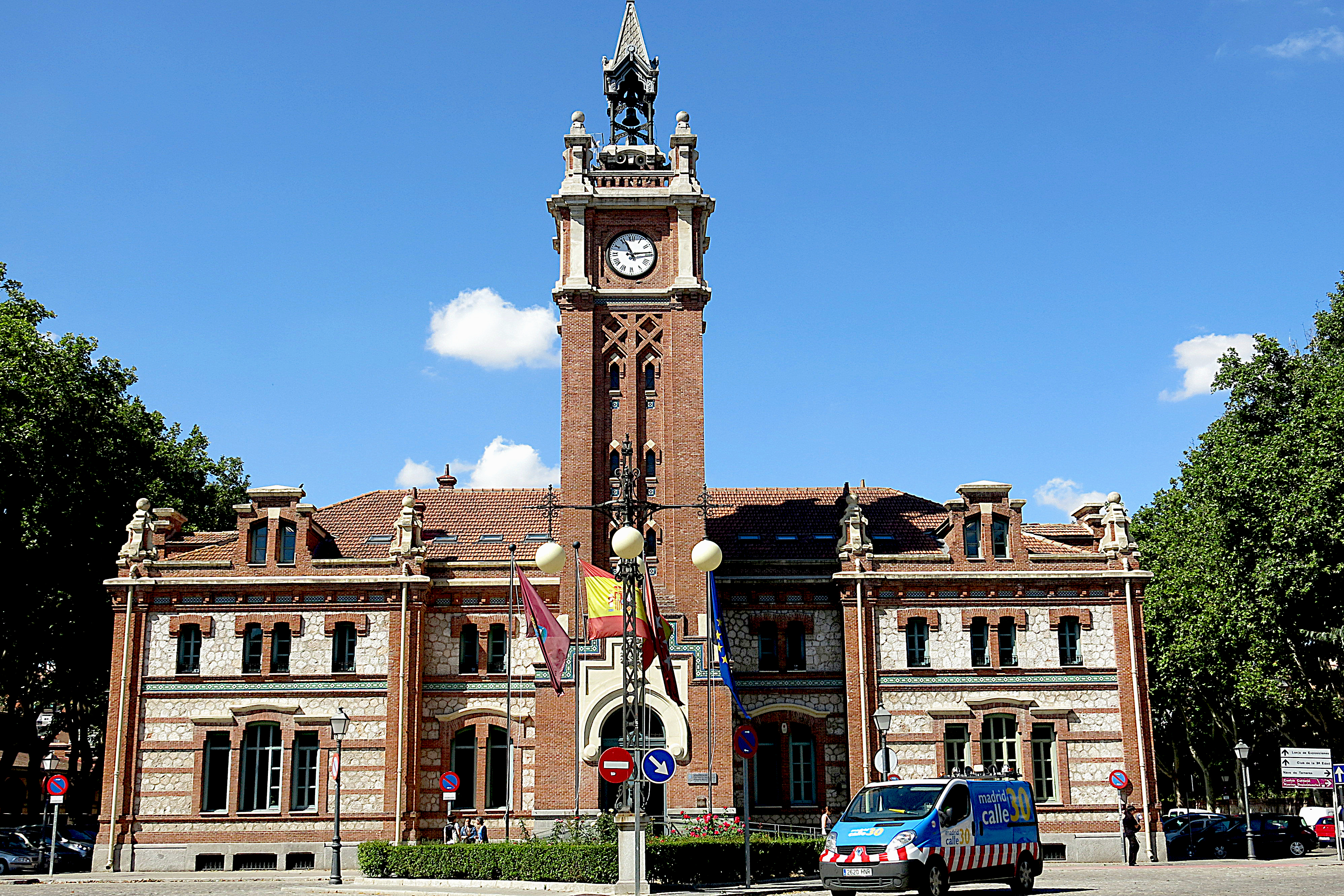
Casa del Reloj, Arganzuela, Madrid, 1933

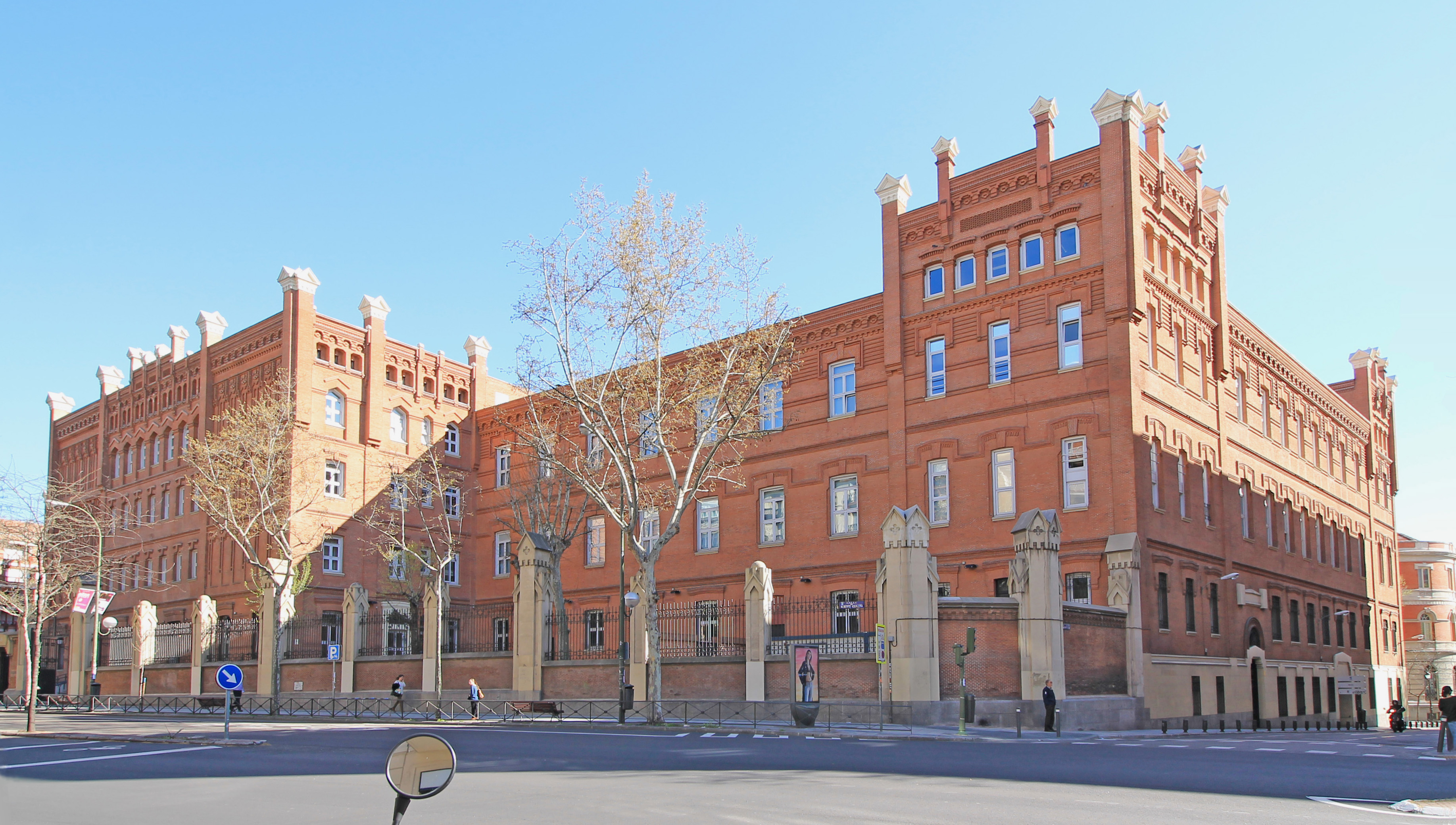
Comillas Pontifical University building in Madrid

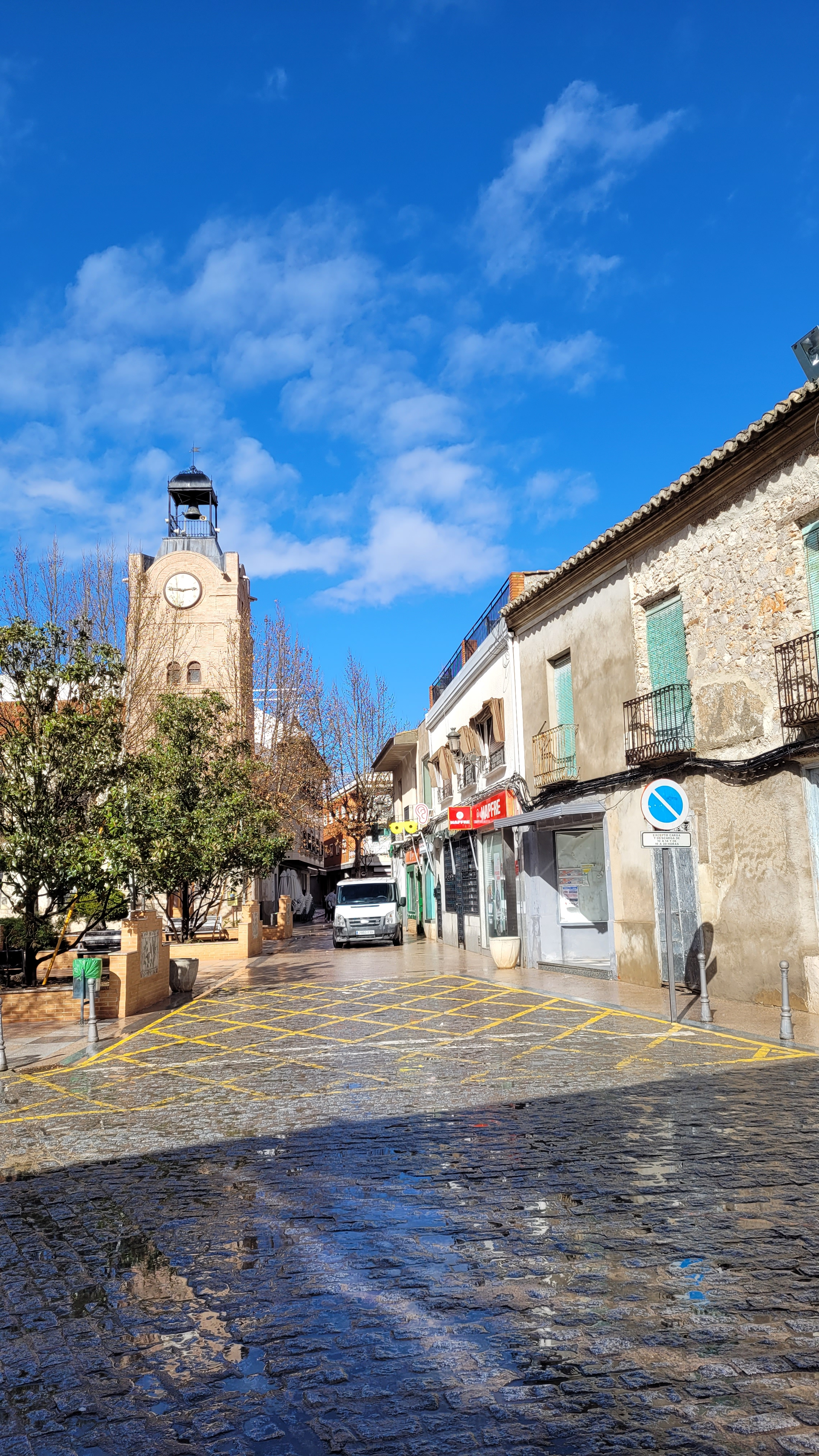
Clock Tower in Villarrubia de los Ojos, Ciudad Real, Spain.

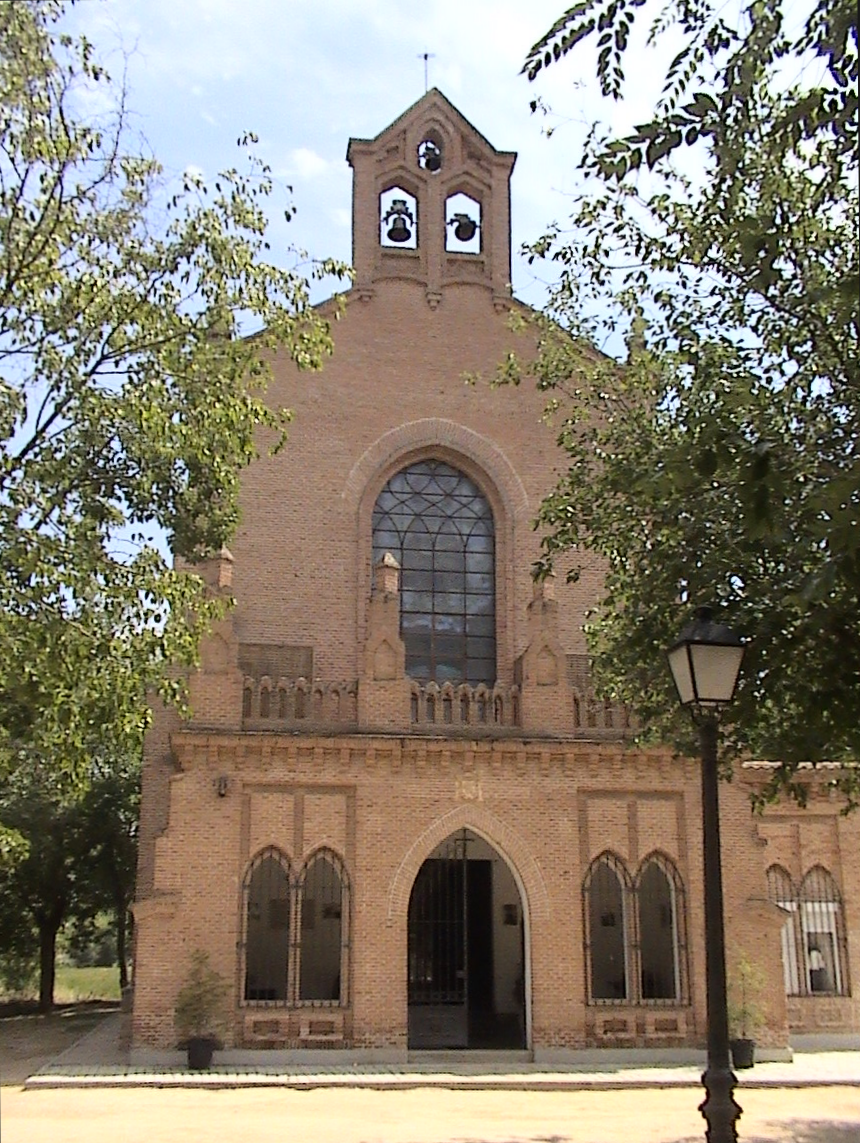
Ermita de la Virgen del Val in Alcalá de Henares, 1926

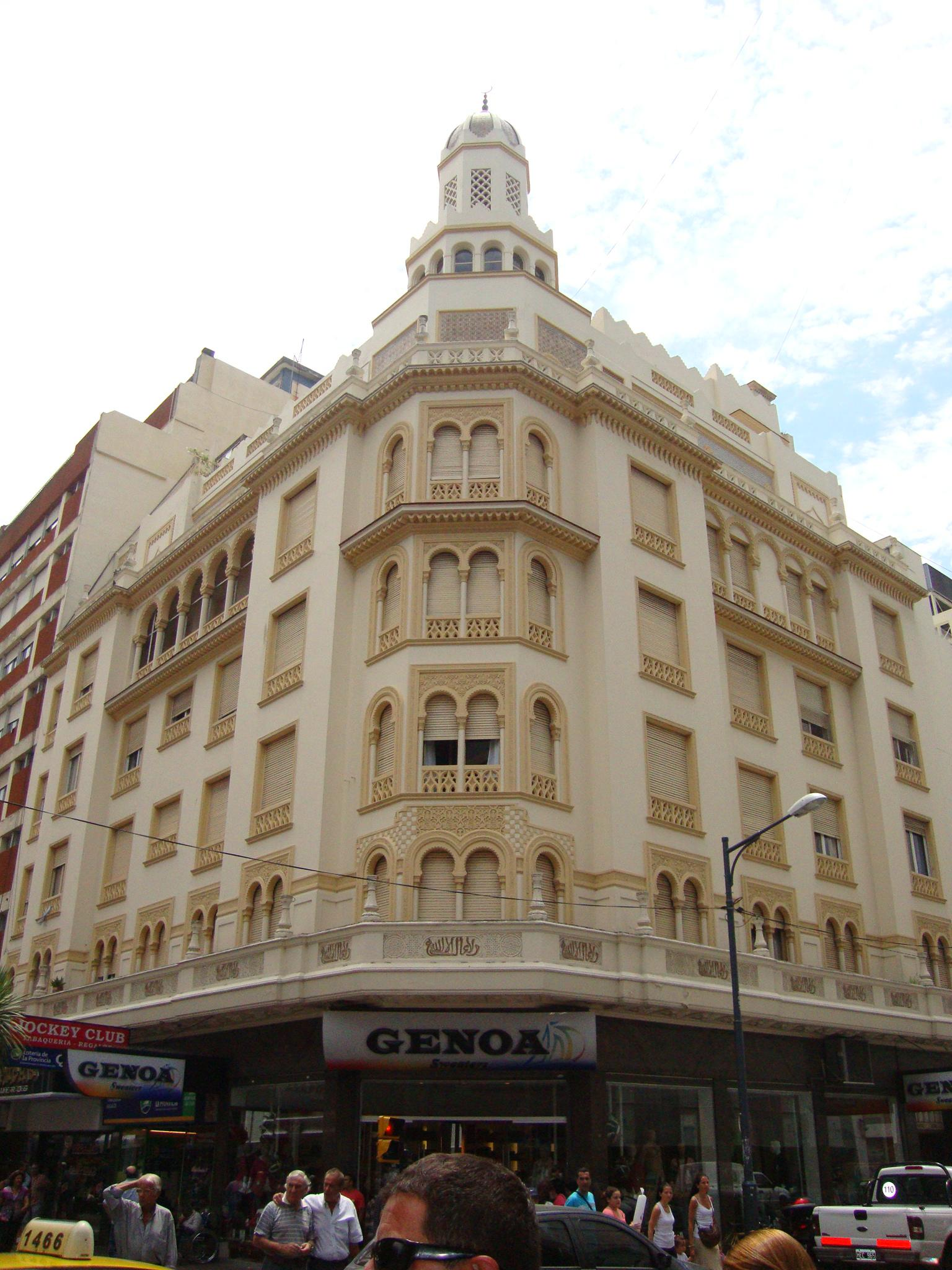
Palacio Arabe, Mar-del-Plata, Argentina, 1949

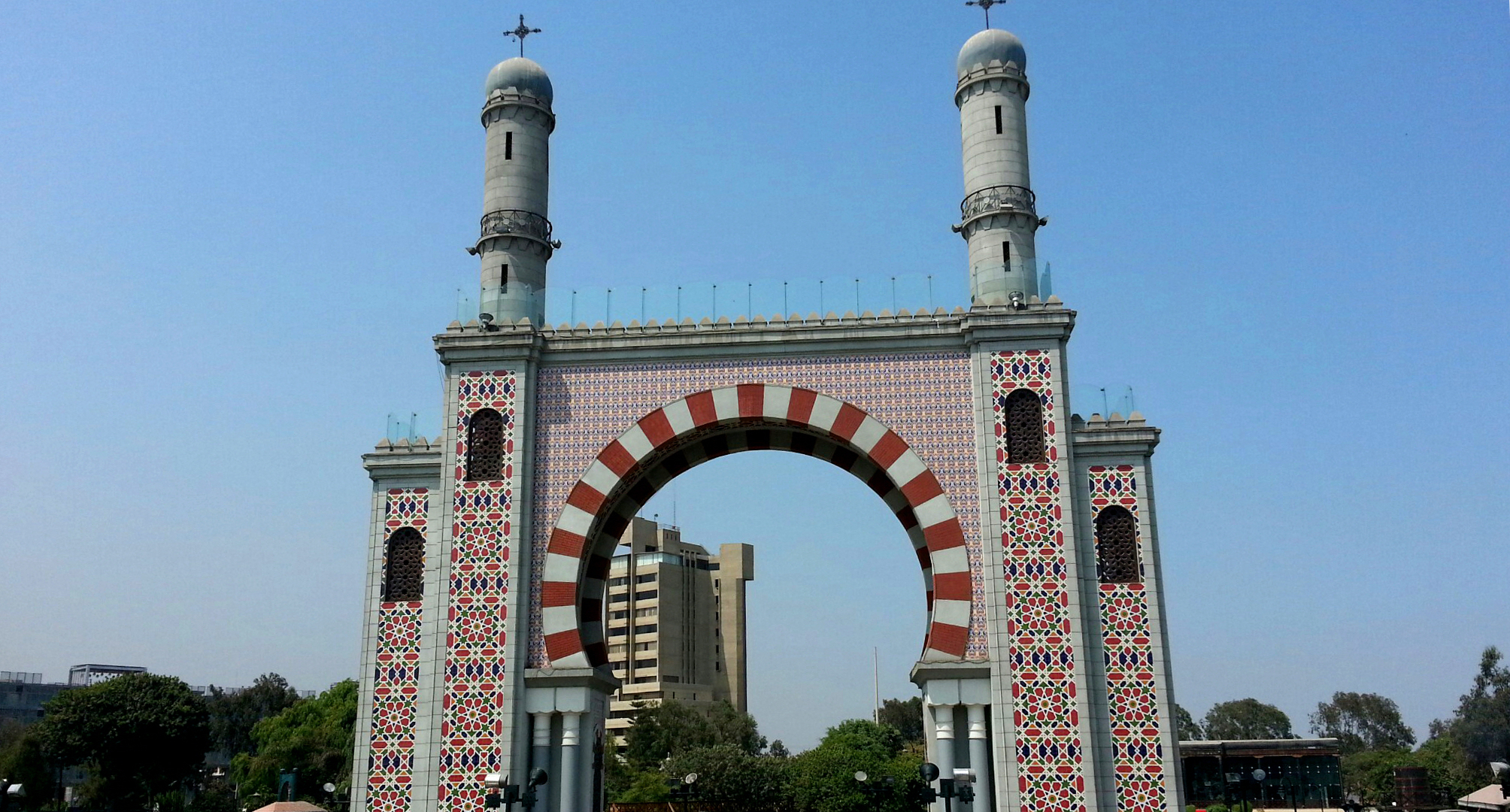
Replica of the Moorish Arch, Lima, 2001

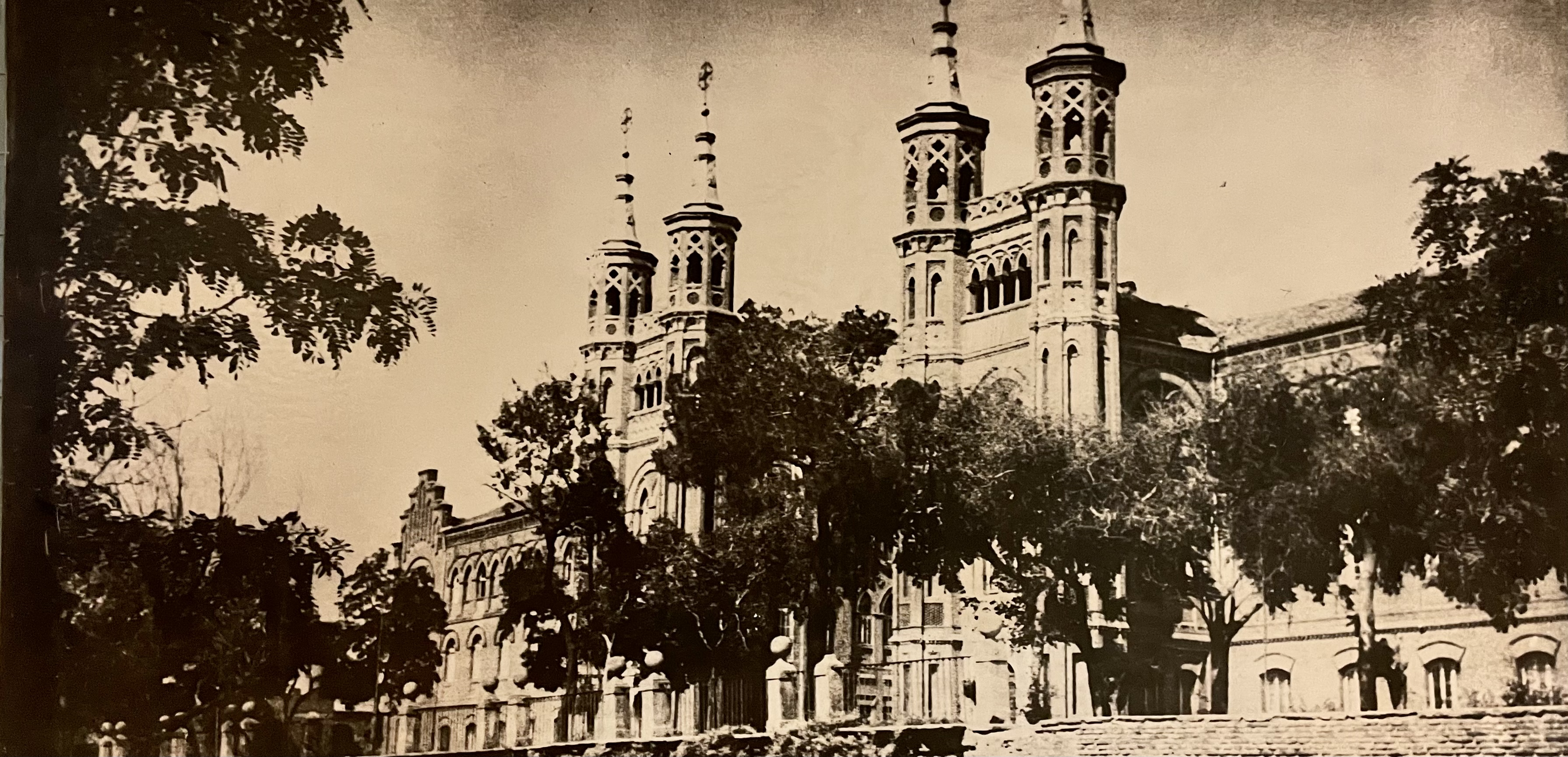
Our Lady of Remembrance College, Madrid, 1880

== See also ==
- Moorish Revival architecture
- Spanish architecture
- Indo-Saracenic architecture
