= Octagonal Mausoleum =

Ancient site in Azerbaijan

Coordinates: 40.416533°N 47.126728°E

Octagonal mausoleum
- Səkkizguşəli türbə
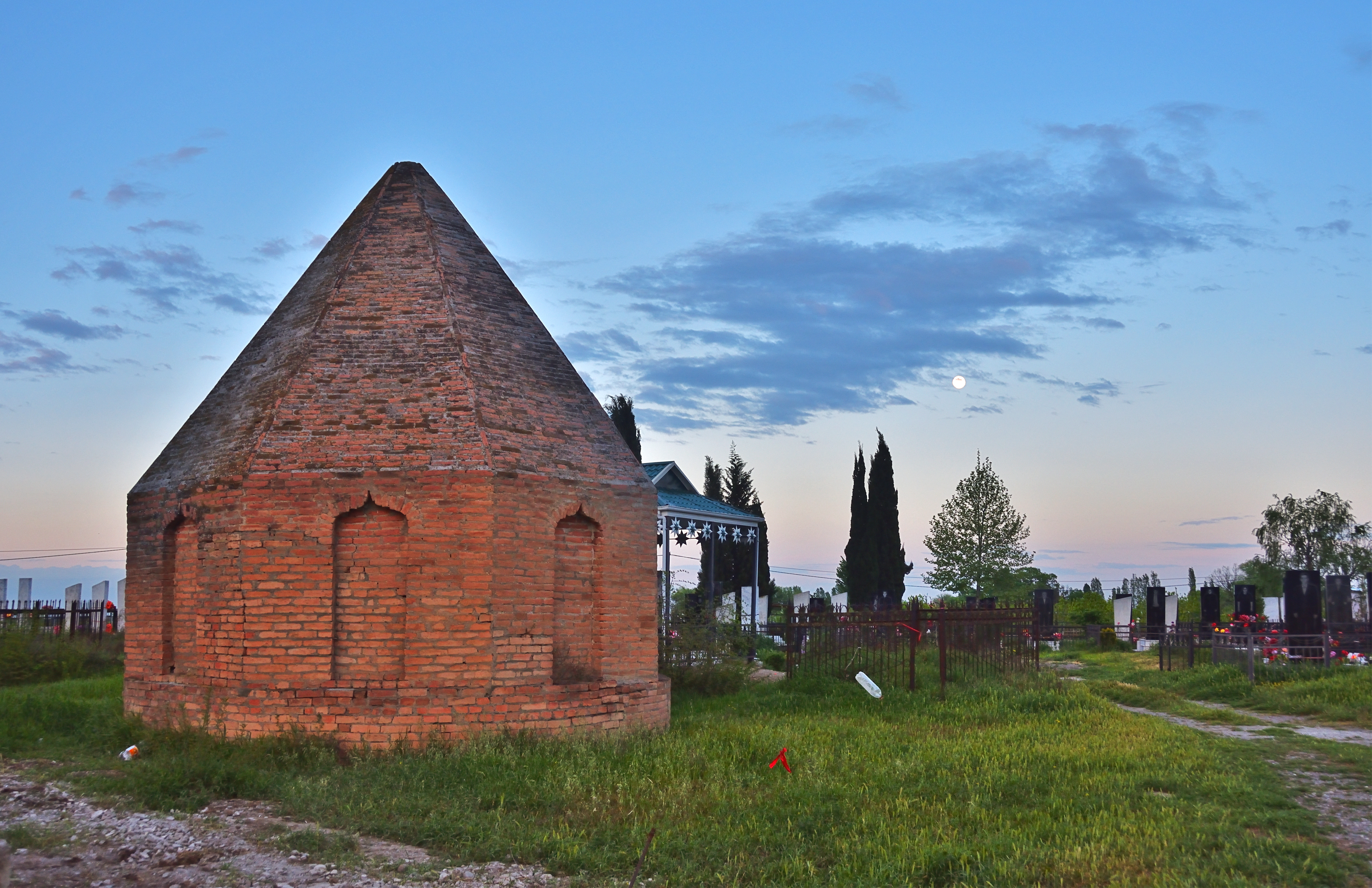
- Interactive map of the Octagonal mausoleum area

General information
- Type: Mausoleum
- Location: Gyuloglylar, Barda, Azerbaijan
- Completed: 18th century

The Octagonal mausoleum or Gyuloglylar mausoleum is a mausoleum located in Gyuloglylar, Barda, in Azerbaijan. It was built in the 18th century.

== See also ==
- Architecture of Azerbaijan
