= Morisco Kiosk =

Pavilion in Mexico City

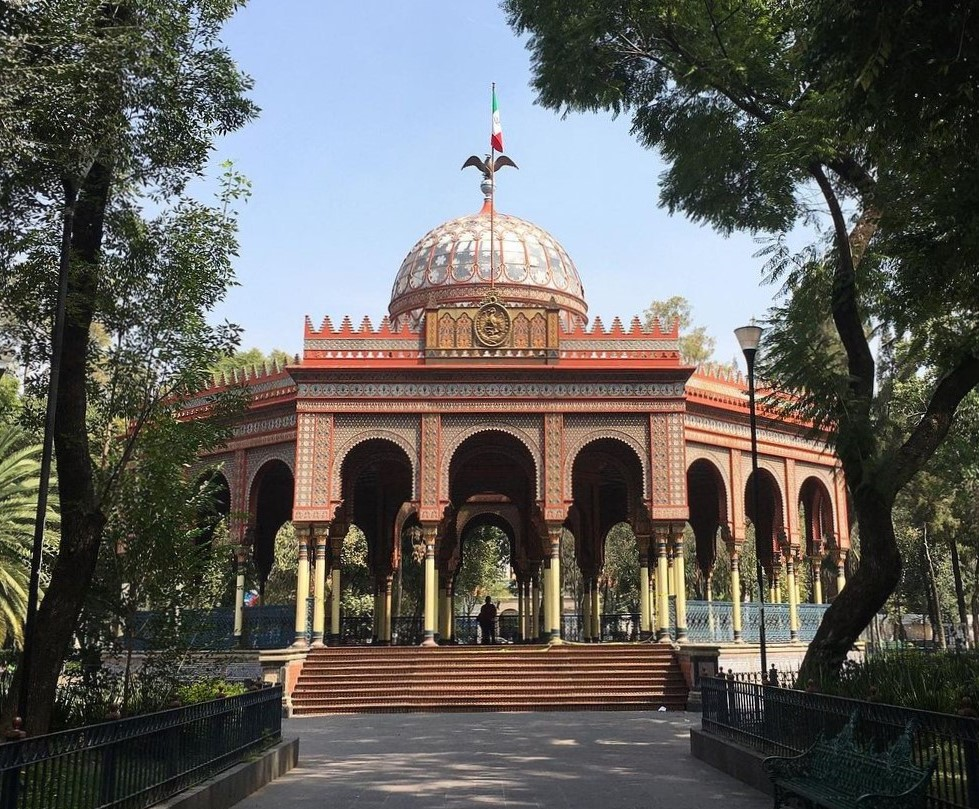
Morisco kiosk in Colonia Santa María la Ribera neighborhood.

The Morisco Kiosk (Local: Kiosco Morisco, English: Moorish Kiosk) is a kiosk structure in Colonia Santa María la Ribera in Mexico City, Mexico. It is situated in the Alameda Park in the center of the Colonia neighborhood, at the intersection of Dr. Atl and Salvador Miron Streets, near Metro Buenavista. The kiosk is built in the neo-Mudejar architectural style that was prevailing in Spain in the 19th century. It is completely made of wrought iron with a glass cupola dome at the top. The kiosk is made of panels that can be disassembled and moved if needed.

== History ==
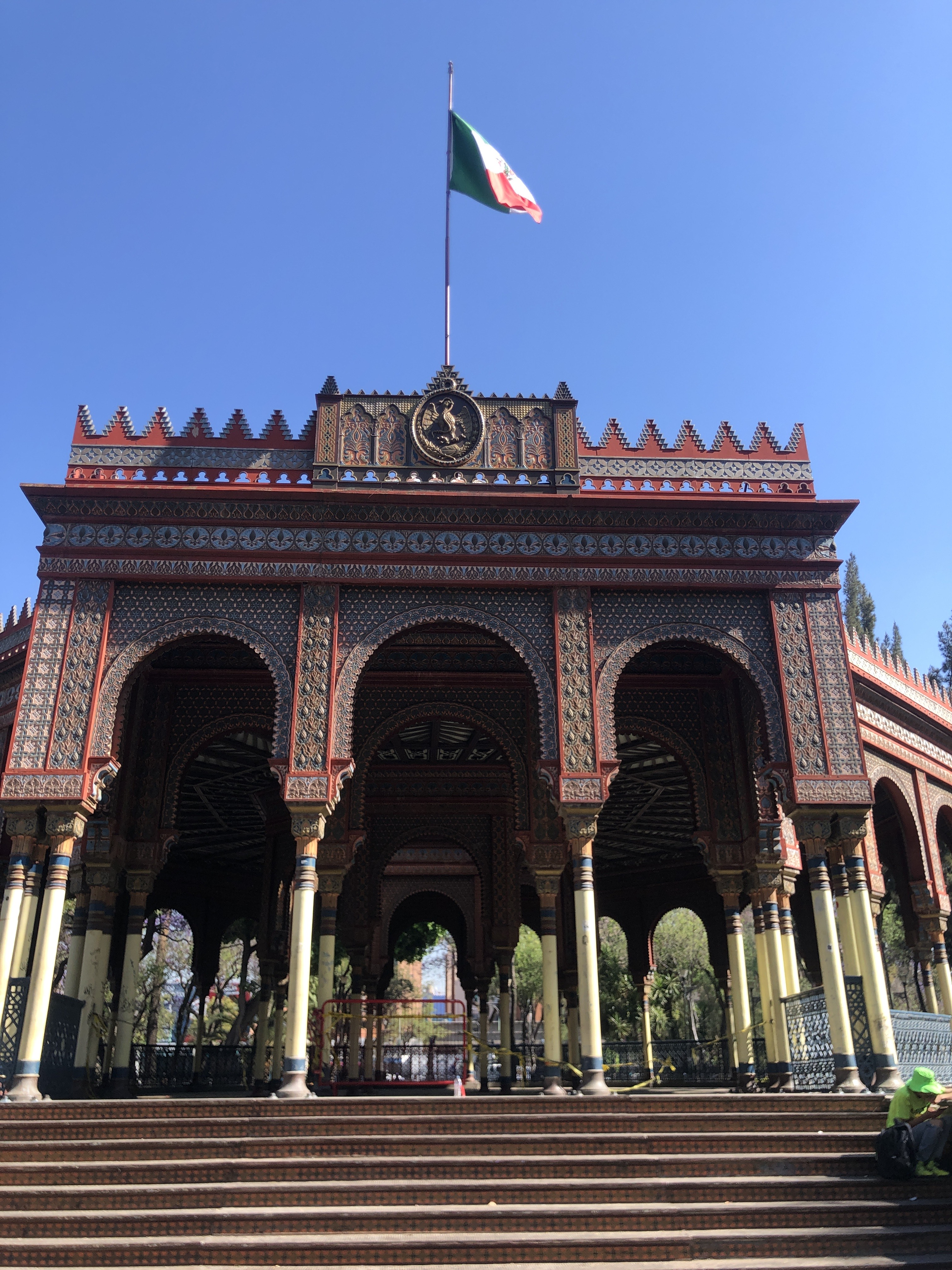

The Morisco Kiosk was built by José Ramón Ibarrola as the Mexico Pavilion at the 1884 World’s Fair in New Orleans. It was then used for the Saint Louis Exposition in 1902. The Kiosk was brought back to Mexico after the events, and first installed on the south side of the Alameda Central in Mexico City. During the Centennial of the Mexican War of Independence it was decided to be moved to make way for the Benito Juárez Monument. Colonia residents petitioned for it to be moved to its present location.

== Architecture ==
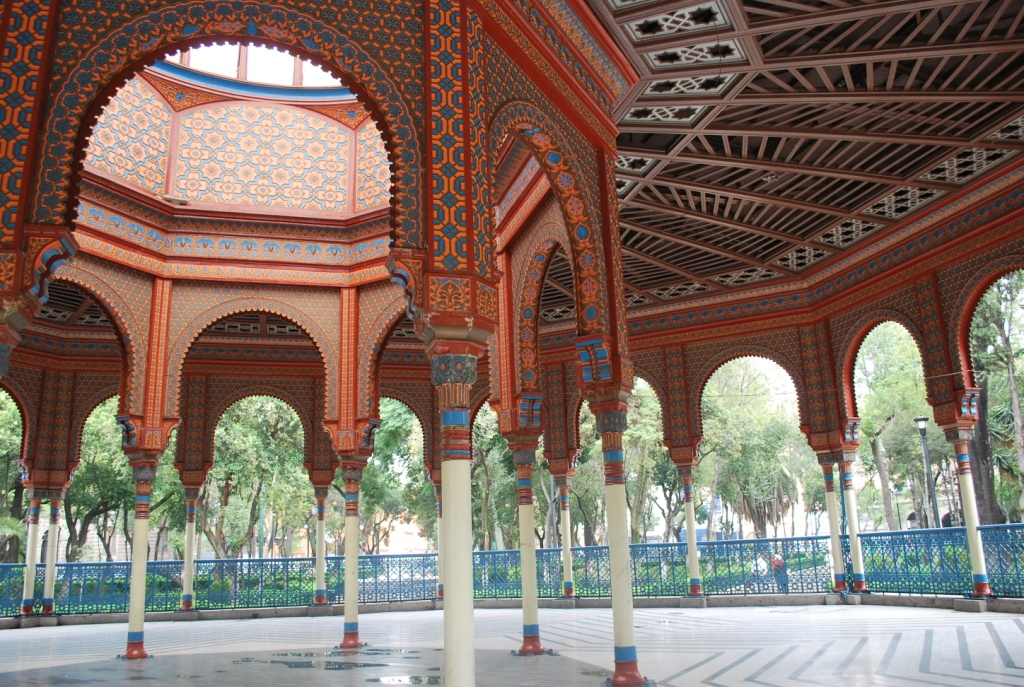
The interior of the kiosk.

The kiosk is built in the neo-Mudejar architectural style which was popular in Spain when this Kiosk was designed in the 19th century. Its neo-Mudejar style is a revival of the older Moorish influenced Mudejar architectural style. The Kiosk made of wrought iron with a glass cupola dome at top. The kiosk is designed for disassembling and moving when needed.
