= Octagon Chapel =

Octagon Chapel in England may refer to:

- Octagon Chapel, Bath, Somerset
- Octagon Chapel, Liverpool, Merseyside
- Octagon Chapel, Norwich, Norfolk
- Octagon Church a.k.a. Octagon Chapel, Wisbech, Isle of Ely

== See also ==
- List of octagonal buildings and structures
- Octagonal churches in Norway
