= Octagon, Virginia =

Unincorporated community in Virginia, United States

Coordinates: 36°54′11″N 77°53′55″W

Octagon is an unincorporated community located in Brunswick County, in the U.S. state of Virginia.
