= Oktogon =

Oktogon may refer to:

- Oktogon (intersection), a major street junction in Budapest, Hungary, octagonal in shape
  - Oktogon (Budapest Metro), a metro station near the aforementioned intersection
- Oktogon (Zagreb), a passageway in central Zagreb, Croatia
