= The Octagon (Heidelberg University) =

Historic house in Ohio, United States

- U.S. National Register of Historic Places
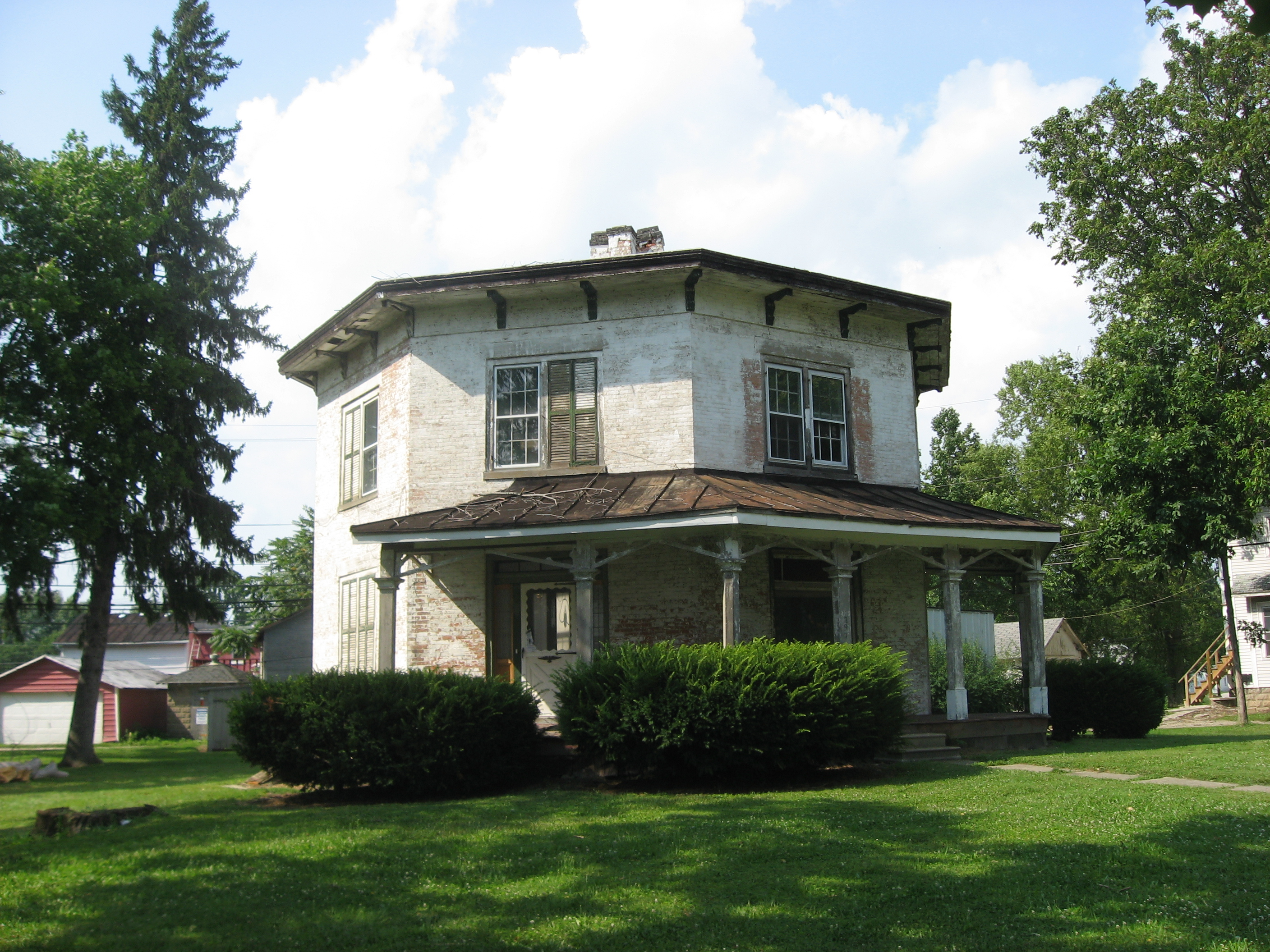
- Southern and southwestern sides of the house

- Location within Ohio Location within the United States
- Location: 297 E. Perry St., Tiffin, Ohio
- Coordinates: 41°7′1″N 83°10′7.5″W
- Area: Less than 1 acre (0.40 ha)
- Built: 1852
- Architect: Jeremiah R. Good
- Architectural style: Octagon Mode
- MPS: Heidelberg College MRA
- NRHP reference No.: 79002764
- Added to NRHP: February 12, 1979

The Octagon is a historic octagon house on the campus of Heidelberg University in Tiffin, Ohio, United States. Built in the mid-19th century, it has been used for residential purposes throughout its history, and while it has experienced over a century of gradual deterioration, it has been named a historic site, and the 21st century has seen plans to restore it to its original integrity.

The Octagon was constructed in 1852, and other than Founders Hall, it was the first building constructed on Heidelberg's campus. Constructed along with the President's House and the Gerhart-Rust Residence, it was, like the others, intended to be used as faculty housing. Its builder and earliest resident was polymath Jeremiah Good, the college's professor of mathematics and also the man responsible for designing Founders Hall. During and after Good's lifetime, he and his family owned the house; since that time, it has passed through a succession of owners, most of whom have been connected to the college in some way. Little upkeep has been performed on the house for many years, permitting it to fall into disrepair; already by 1910 it had been subdivided into a pair of apartments, and during the 1960s it was rented by the college and used as a student dormitory. The university finally purchased the house in 2007, after a wealthy man from New Bremen gave a large sum of money to the institution. Since that time, students, faculty, and administrators have discussed the proper method of using the Octagon; a class of students studying concepts of space and place conducted a small informal archaeological excavation, finding nothing substantial, while officials have debated restoring the property.

Built of brick on a stone foundation, the two-story house features a second-story window on each side, while the first story segments are occupied either by a door or a window. A wrap-around porch surrounds several of the sides, but it does not continue to the house's rear. The house is covered with a hip roof that rises only a small distance from the edges to the center; it is made of tin.

In 1979, the Octagon was listed on the National Register of Historic Places, qualifying because of its historically significant architecture. It was one of twelve buildings on the campus added to the Register at the same time, all as part of a multiple property submission known as the "Heidelberg College Multiple Resource Area".
