= The Octagon at Amherst College =

Building at Amherst College

Coordinates: 42°22′17.1″N 72°31′8.7″W

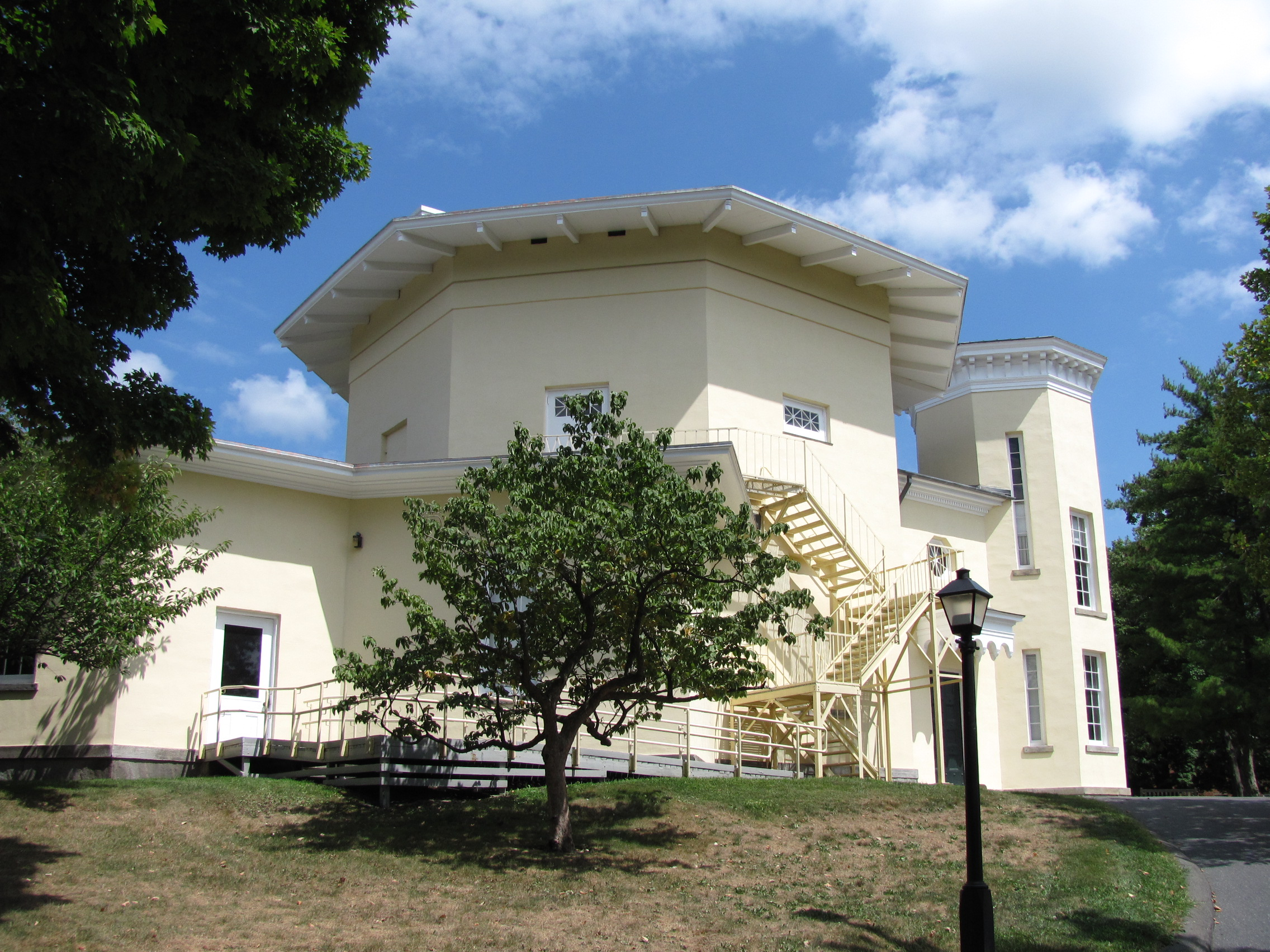
The Octagon at Amherst College

The foundation thus laid by Andrew Lawrence will hereafter sustain the instruments of modern society to draw from the skies a knowledge of the stars - to demonstrate to men the Glory of God, and the magnificence of His works, - and to show to their wondering minds that "the thousand brilliant worlds which circle round Him, are governed by one law, and that in wisdom 'He has made them all'"

The Octagon at Amherst College was the first natural history museum and observatory on campus. Edward Hitchcock (President of Amherst College in 1845) hired Henry A. Sykes to build it. It was intended to be unusual, with its elegant dome observatory and the collection of materials ranging from meteorites to animals and fossils. The Octagon was constructed in 1847–48.
