= Plain, Wisconsin =

- Village
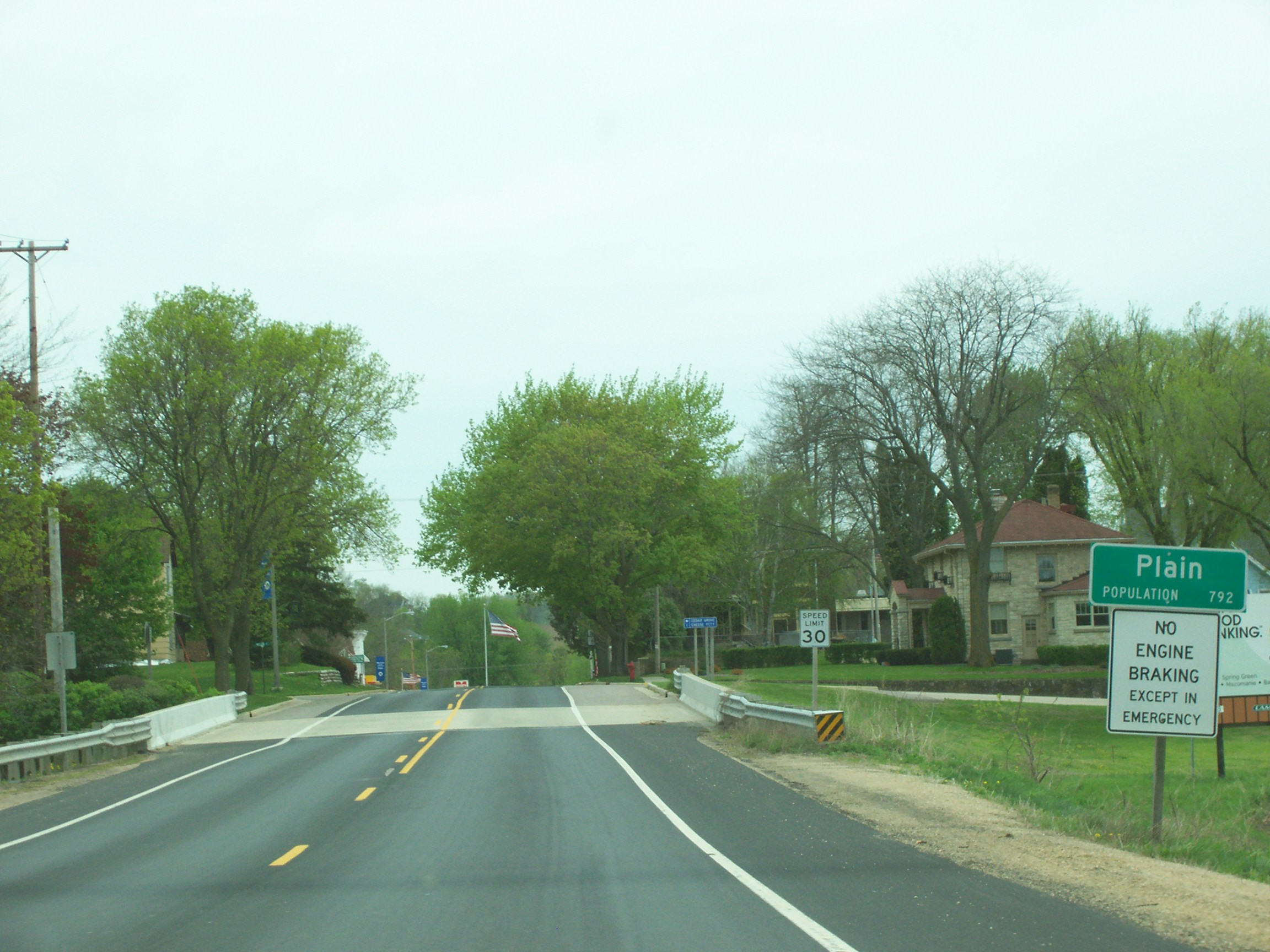
- Looking south at Plain on Wisconsin Highway 23

- Location of Plain in Sauk County, Wisconsin.
- Coordinates: 43°16′39″N 90°2′40″W
- Country: United States
- State: Wisconsin
- County: Sauk

Area
  - Total: 0.83 sq mi (2.16 km^{2})
  - Land: 0.83 sq mi (2.16 km^{2})
  - Water: 0 sq mi (0.00 km^{2})
- Elevation: 810 ft (247 m)

Population (2020)
  - Total: 749
  - Density: 898/sq mi (347/km^{2})
- Time zone: UTC-6 (Central (CST))
  - Summer (DST): UTC-5 (CDT)
- Area code: 608
- FIPS code: 55-63125
- GNIS feature ID: 1571574

Plain is a village in Sauk County, Wisconsin, United States. The population was 749 at the 2020 census.

== Geography ==
Plain is located at 43°16′39″N 90°2′40″W (43.277580, -90.044563).

According to the United States Census Bureau, the village has a total area of 0.83 square miles (2.15 km^{2}), all land.

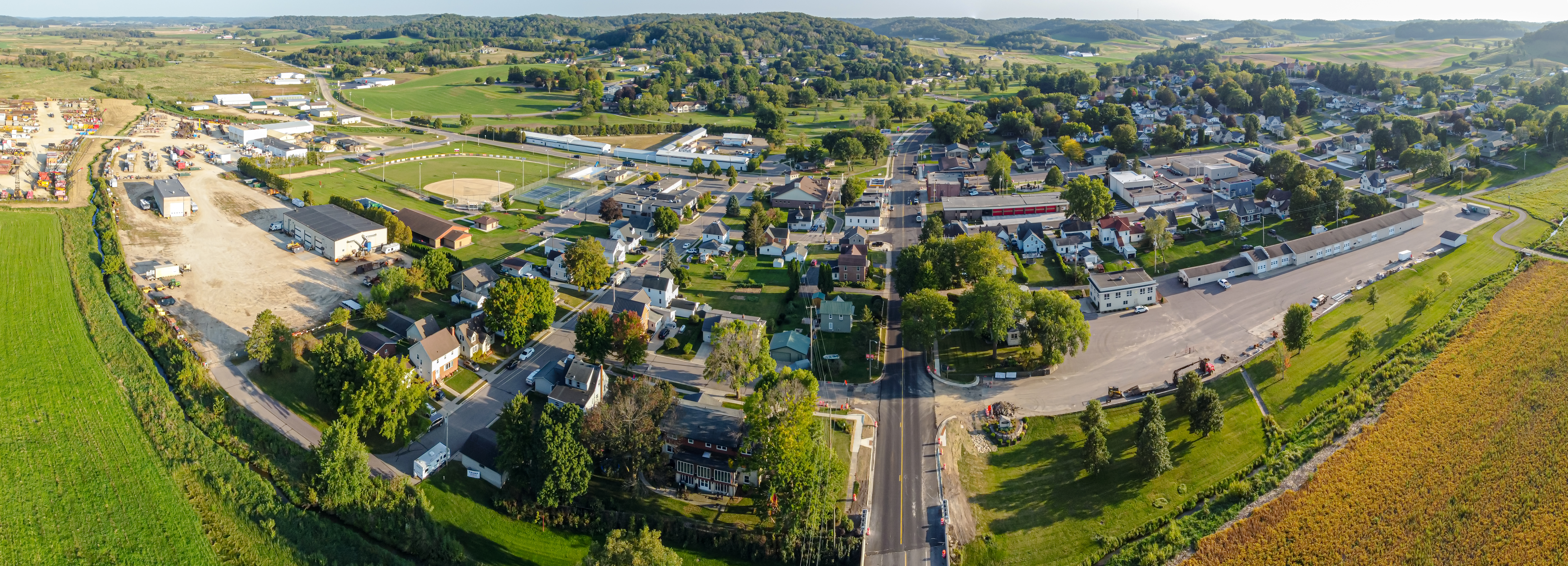

== History ==
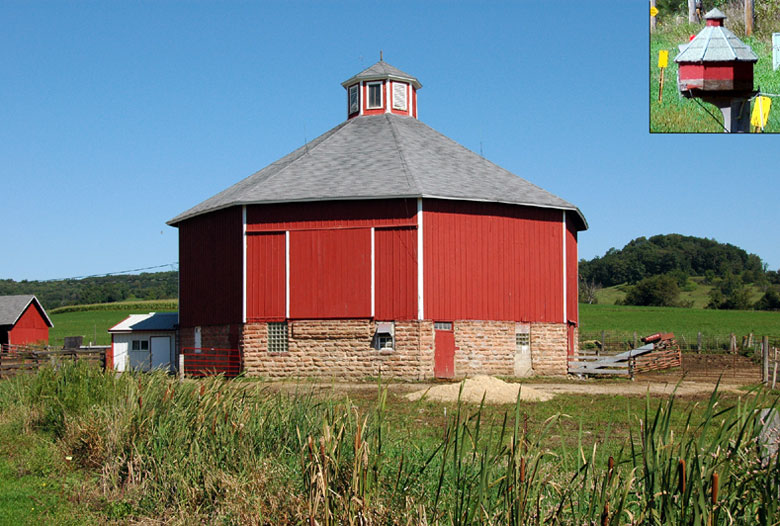
Octagon Barn and owner's mailbox near Plain, Wisconsin

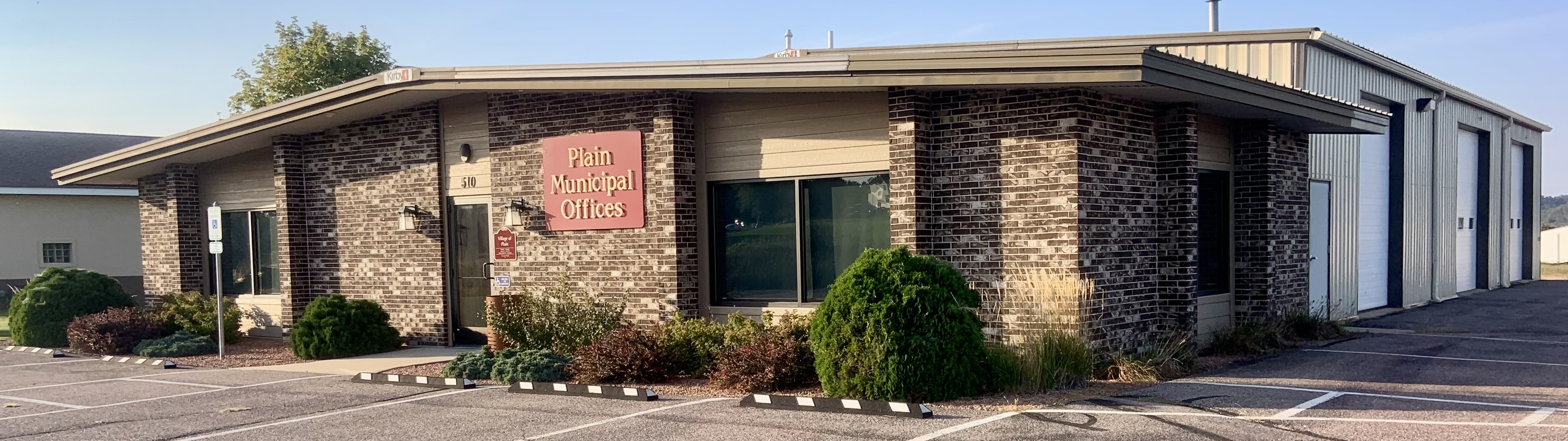
Plain Village Hall

The village of Plain is located on Wisconsin Highway 23 and County Road B in the Township of Franklin. The area of Plain was originally known as Cramer's Corners after four Cramer brothers (John, Jeremiah, Adam and Solomon, Sr.) moved to the Plain area in the early 1850s. They came from Troy Township in Richland County, Ohio and Morrow County, Ohio. Joseph Cramer was originally from Letterkenny Township, Pennsylvania.

The Cramers are listed as land owners in the 1859 Town of Franklin map. This Cramer family should not be confused with the Kraemer [Krämer] family from Irlach, Bavaria, Germany, who settled in Plain, Wisconsin, in 1867. Several rough buildings were erected and the area acquired the nickname of Logtown (also spelled Log Town).

A post office was proposed to be established at Plain on March 31, 1858, with B. V. Bunnel as postmaster. The proposed mail route was Prairie du Sac, Sauk City, Harrisburg, Plain, Maqua to Sextonville in Richland County. Plain formally became a village in 1912.

The origin of the village's name is widely rumored to have been selected as an homage to the Shrine of the Virgin Mary at Maria Plain on the hill known as Plainberg in the village of Bergheim, Austria outside Salzburg, Austria. There are, however, no known documents, newspaper articles or books of the time to support this claim, and writings of the time indicate a less colorful origin. Plain was "called Plain because the inhabitants were plain people".

In September 1915, a subscriber of the local newspaper wrote of his desire to have Plain re-christened as the town had expanded and improved so much over the past three years that it had outgrown the "plain"-ness of its name. The unnamed author wrote: "Within a few weeks very strong efforts will be made at proper headquarters to have the name of Plain changed, as that name does not agree with the rushing strides our burg is making. First of all there is no meaning to the word Plain, as it is an adjective; we must have at least a noun and why not put a 'ville' or 'city' to it."

Old Franklin Township Historical Society (OFTHS) in Plain, Wisconsin, was organized in 2004 in the former Town Hall of Franklin, Sauk County, Wisconsin located on Highway 23 at 915 Wachter Avenue. Museum exhibits are open to the public during open house events and by special request.

== Sister cities ==
Plain is twinned with:

- Remlingen (Unterfranken) and the expellees from the former Sudeten-German villages of Schwansdorf and Tschirm, Kreis Troppau, now the Czech Republic. Since February 9, 1999
- Waldmünchen since December 13, 2022

== Demographics ==
Historical population
Census	Pop.	Note	%±
1920	324		—
1930	331		2.2%
1940	405		22.4%
1950	512		26.4%
1960	677		32.2%
1970	688		1.6%
1980	676		−1.7%
1990	691		2.2%
2000	792		14.6%
2010	773		−2.4%
2020	749		−3.1%
U.S. Decennial Census

=== 2010 census ===
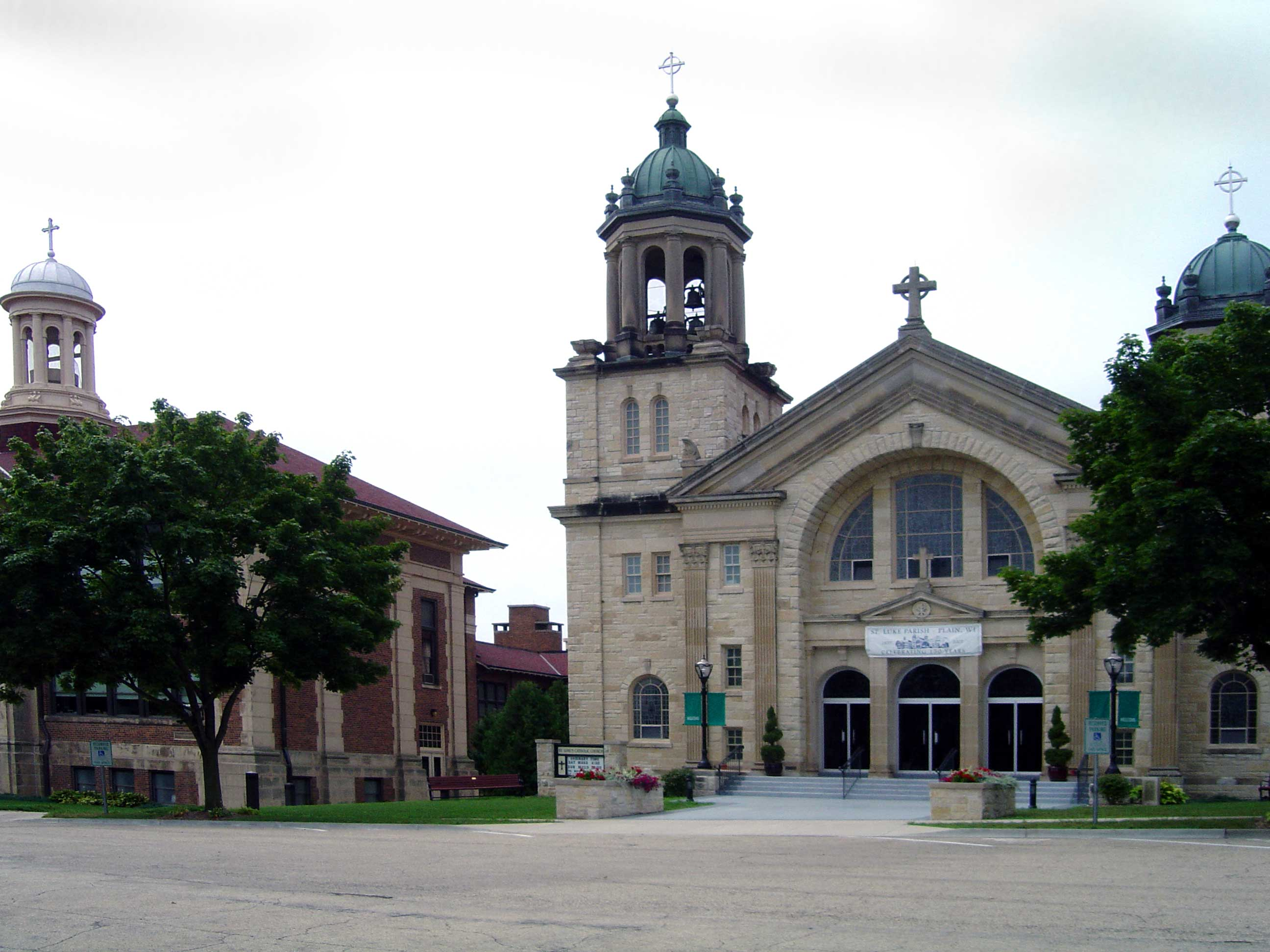
St. Luke's Catholic Church

As of the census of 2010, there were 773 people, 321 households, and 224 families living in the village. The population density was 931.3 inhabitants per square mile (359.6/km^{2}). There were 358 housing units at an average density of 431.3 per square mile (166.5/km^{2}). The racial makeup of the village was 97.2% White, 0.1% African American, 0.9% Native American, 0.3% Asian, 0.5% from other races, and 1.0% from two or more races. Hispanic or Latino of any race were 1.8% of the population.

There were 321 households, of which 31.5% had children under the age of 18 living with them, 56.4% were married couples living together, 7.2% had a female householder with no husband present, 6.2% had a male householder with no wife present, and 30.2% were non-families. 25.9% of all households were made up of individuals, and 12.1% had someone living alone who was 65 years of age or older. The average household size was 2.41 and the average family size was 2.86.

The median age in the village was 40.8 years. 24.2% of residents were under the age of 18; 8.4% were between the ages of 18 and 24; 21.9% were from 25 to 44; 27.8% were from 45 to 64; and 17.7% were 65 years of age or older. The gender makeup of the village was 50.8% male and 49.2% female.

=== 2000 census ===
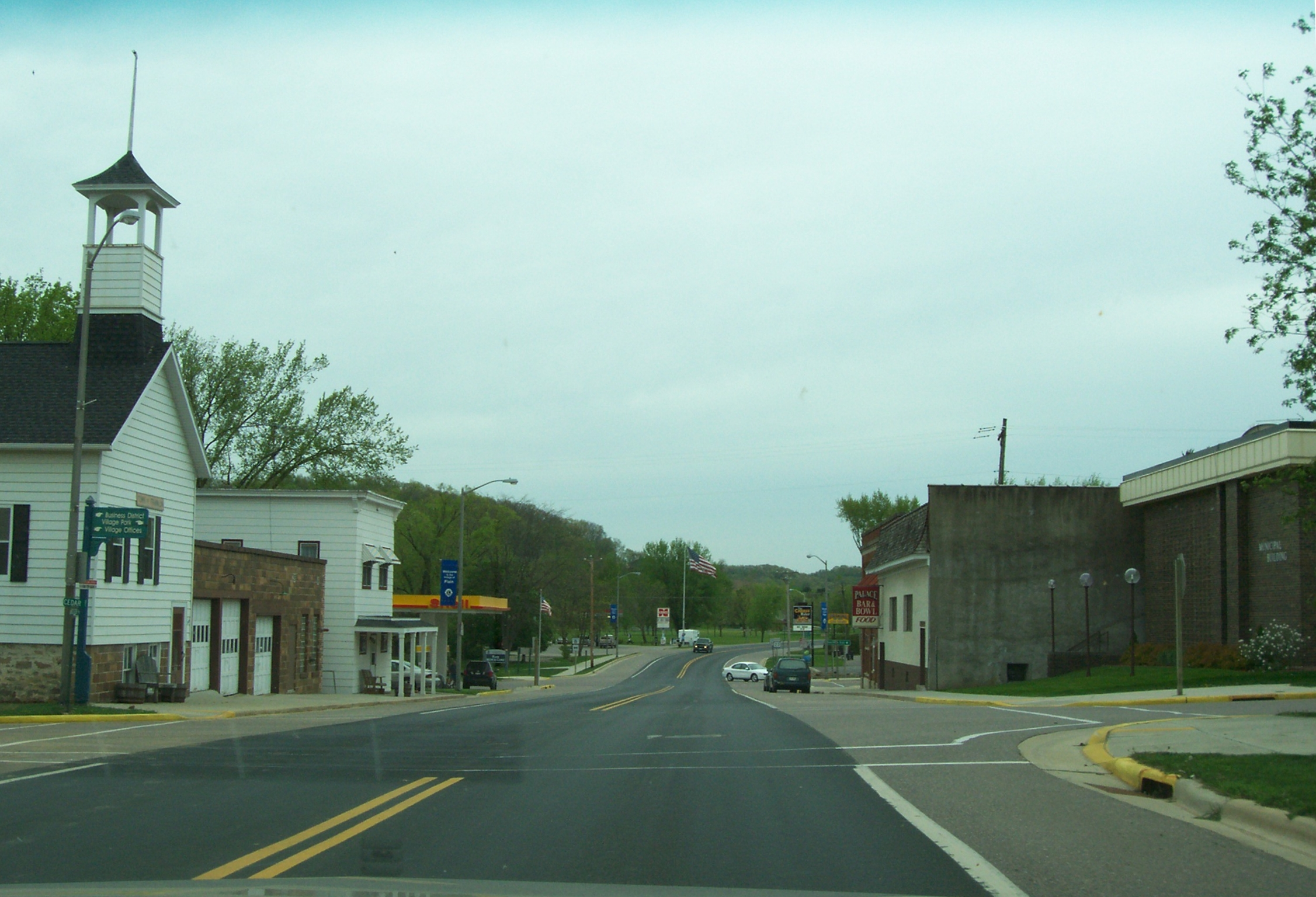
Looking south at downtown Plain on Highway 23

As of the census of 2000, there were 792 people, 333 households, and 224 families living in the village. The population density was 1,083.4 people per square mile (418.9/km^{2}). There were 339 housing units at an average density of 463.7 per square mile (179.3/km^{2}). The racial makeup of the village was 98.61% White, 0.25% African American, 0.63% Native American, 0.38% from other races, and 0.13% from two or more races. Hispanic or Latino of any race were 0.88% of the population.

There were 333 households, out of which 31.8% had children under the age of 18 living with them, 58.9% were married couples living together, 5.7% had a female householder with no husband present, and 32.7% were non-families. 28.5% of all households were made up of individuals, and 14.1% had someone living alone who was 65 years of age or older. The average household size was 2.38 and the average family size was 2.96.

In the village, the population was spread out, with 26.3% under the age of 18, 5.3% from 18 to 24, 27.4% from 25 to 44, 21.2% from 45 to 64, and 19.8% who were 65 years of age or older. The median age was 39 years. For every 100 females, there were 102.0 males. For every 100 females age 18 and over, there were 96.6 males.

The median income for a household in the village was $44,028, and the median income for a family was $51,094. Males had a median income of $34,236 versus $25,385 for females. The per capita income for the village was $24,658. About 0.9% of families and 2.6% of the population were below the poverty line, including 2.1% of those under age 18 and 4.0% of those age 65 or over.

== Festivals ==
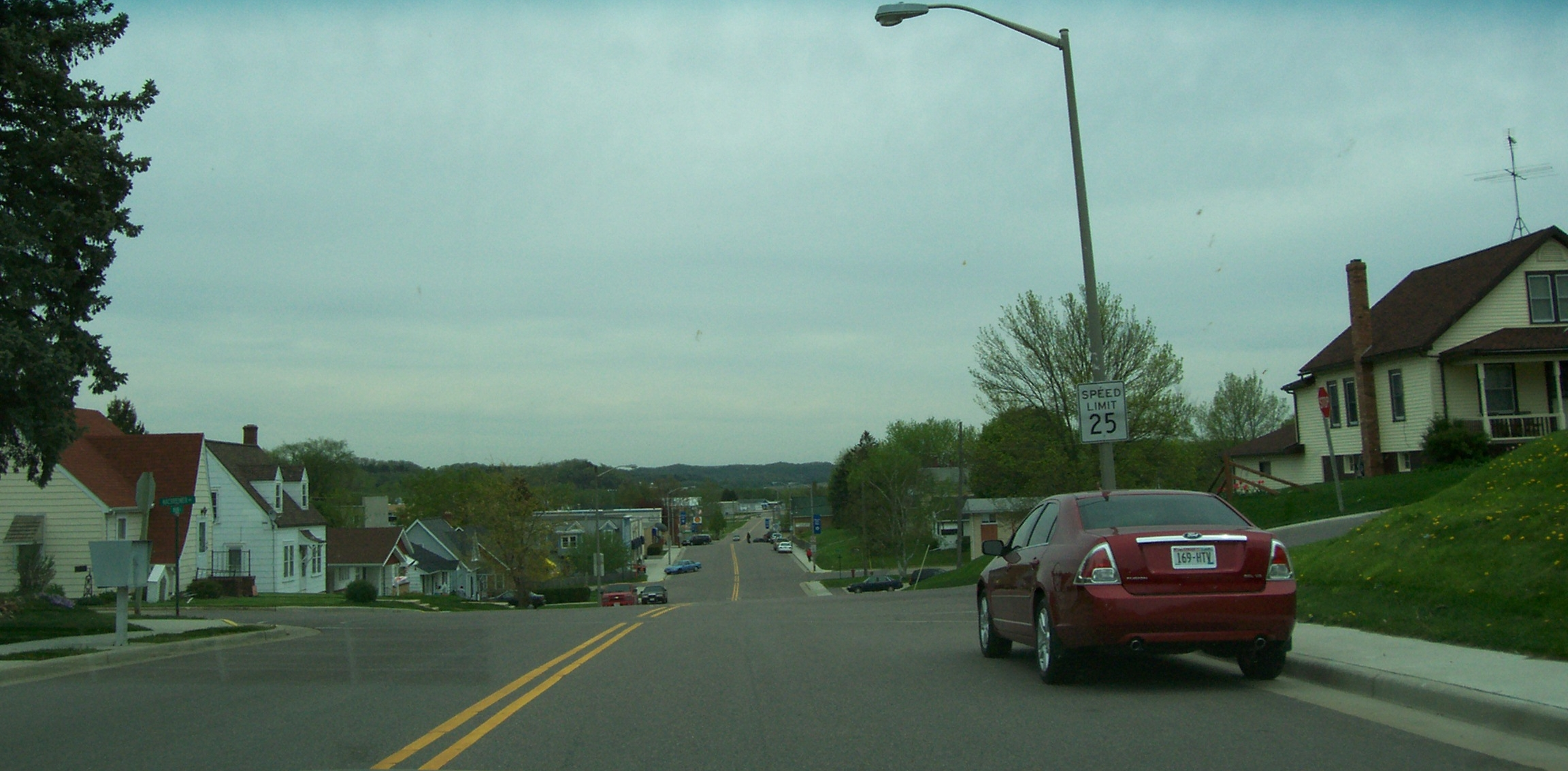
Looking east at the residential area of Plain

Festivals in Plain include the following

- St. Luke's Parish Festival called "Sommerfest" is held annually on a weekend in June.
- The Plain Fire Department and EMS service sponsors a 3-day celebration in July which includes such activities as kickball, baseball, entertainment for children, a parade, and fireworks on Saturday night.
- "Strassenfest" is held on the first Saturday in October when the village of Plain showcases local businesses with music, food, and crafts with a focus on the community's early Bavarian heritage.
- "Christkindlmarkt" is a German festival held on the weekend following Thanksgiving with events for all ages including horse and carriage rides, a visit with Santa, an Elf workshop, open house of the local history museum, craft market and holiday vendors, and an evening procession to St. Luke's church with German hymns.

== Notable people ==
- Rose Thering (1920-2006), of the Racine Dominican Sisters, was a professor of Catholic-Jewish dialogue at Seton Hall University. A film about Sister Rose's life, Sister Rose's Passion, was nominated for the 2005 Academy Award for Best Documentary Short.

== See also ==
- List of villages in Wisconsin
- Franklin, Sauk County, Wisconsin - surrounds the Village of Plain
