= Sławomir Grünberg =

Documentary producer

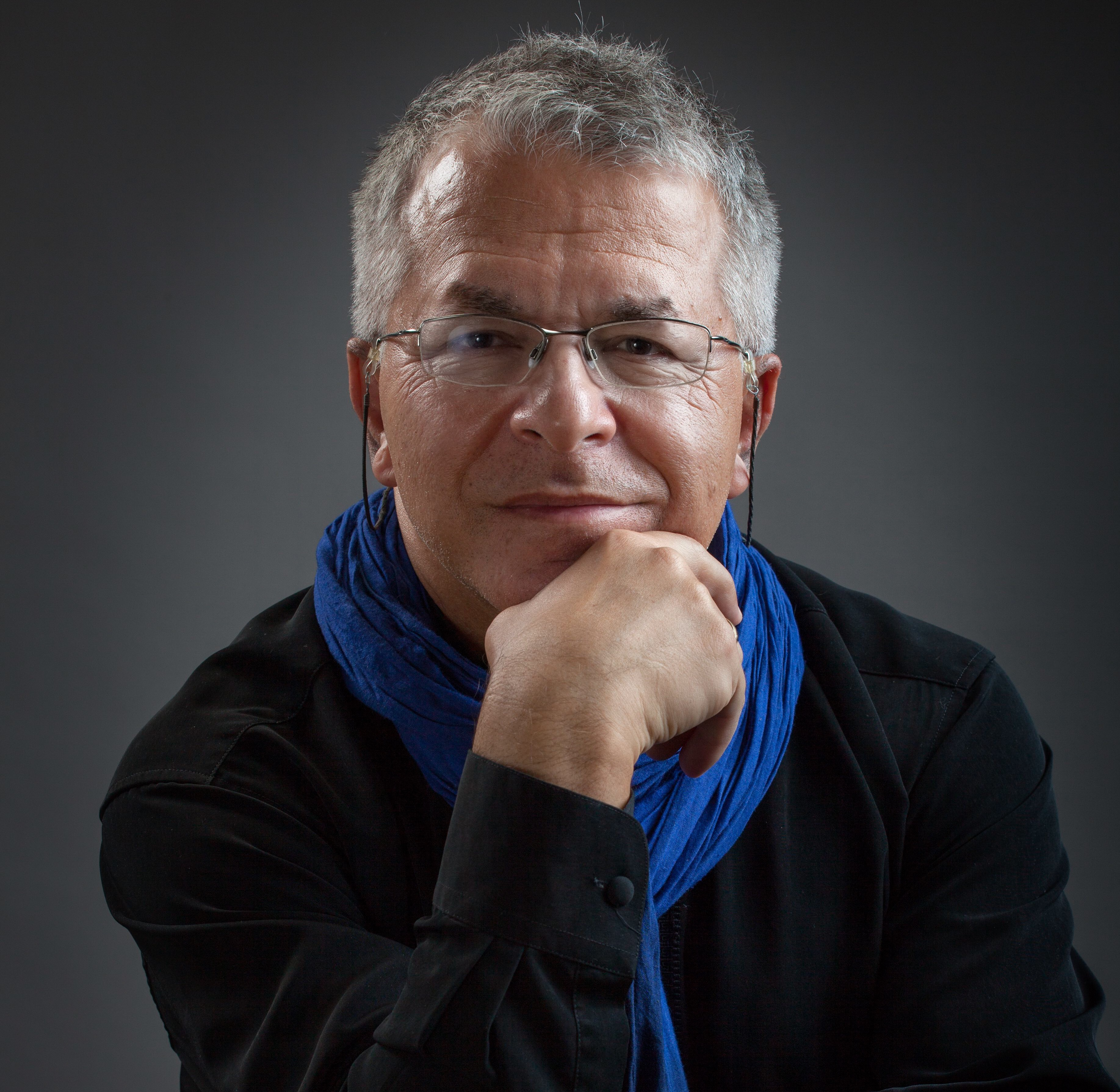
Sławomir Grünberg

Sławomir Grünberg is a Polish-born naturalized American documentary producer, director, and cameraman.

== Early life and education ==
Sławomir Grünberg was born to a Jewish family in Lublin, Poland.

He isgraduate of the Polish Film School in Łódź.

== Career ==
Grünberg immigrated to the United States in 1981, and has since directed and produced over 45 documentaries. He is the founder and president of LOGTV, Ltd.

Grünberg's film School Prayer: A Community At War (1999), screened on PBS, received an Emmy Award. It also won the Jan Karski Award in a competition which recognizes outstanding television documentaries produced on the theme of moral courage.

In 2004, Grünberg received the Dream Catcher Award, to recognize his commitment to documentary filmmaking.

Sławomir Grünberg's independent works focus on critical social, political, environmental issues, with a special interest in Jewish themes and threatened identities, and have won him international recognition.Chelyabinsk: The Most Contaminated Spot on the Planet, was awarded the Grand Prix at the International Nature & Environmental Film Festival, in Grenoble, France in 1996. In 1998, another documentary, which deals with environmental issues, From Chechnya to Chernobyl, was awarded a Grand Prix at the International Environmental Film Festival in Prague, Czech Republic and a prestigious Golden Cine Award in the US. "Fenceline: A Company Town Divided" is another environmental documentary film, awarded Best Documentary Feature by Environmental Media Association in 2003. In 2006, "Saved by Deportation: An Unknown Odyssey of Polish Jews] won Grunberg The Audience Award for Best Documentary at the Washington Jewish Film Festival.

Films directed by Sławomir Grünberg include: Still Life in Lodz; Karski & The Lords of Humanity, 2016 Lavr Award - the Russian “Oscar”; Grand Prix at the International Historical Film Festival, Warsaw, Poland; Nomination for The Eagles Awards - the Polish “Oscar”, Best Polish documentary – "Jewish Motives" at International Film Festival, Warsaw, Poland, Don't Cry When I'm Gone, Shimon's Returns, Santa Rosa, Castaways (co-directed with Tomasz Wiśniewski), Magda(co-directed with Katka Reszke), Coming Out Polish Style (co-directed with Katka Reszke), Trans-Action (HBO Central Europe), The Peretzniks, which premiered at Lincoln Center's Walter Reade Theater, NYC 2010, Paint What You Remember, premiered at Toronto Jewish Film Festival 2010, and Portraits of Emotion, a film about autism, which won him many international awards including: an Expression Award at Brazil's Disability Film Festival, Grand Prix at the International Film Festival "Integration - You and Me", Koszalin, Poland 2008, and Grand Prix at the Belgrade International Film Festival, 2010. In 2010, Sławomir co-produced and shot In the Name of Their Mothers: The Story of Irena Sendler by Mary Skinner. Docboat 2009 - Warsaw Nonfiction E-Festival, granted Sławomir a prestigious award for Internationally Acclaimed Documentary Filmmaker with Polish Roots.

Grünberg's director of photography credits include: HBO's Legacy, which received an Academy Award Nomination for the best documentary feature in 2001, and HBO's Sister Rose's Passion, which won Best in Documentary Short at the Tribeca Film Festival in 2004 and received an Academy Award Nomination for best documentary short in 2005. As a principal director of photography Sławomir shot over 70 documentaries, seven of which received Emmy Nominations and two of which received Emmy Awards. Sławomir has also been a contributing director of photography for the PBS series: Frontline; AIDS Quarterly, American Masters, NOVA, Health Quarterly, Inside Gorbachev’s USSR with Hedrick Smithand People’s Century, ABC, NBC, HBO, Lifetime, Discovery, Lifetime and HBO. Sławomir had worked with such filmmakers as: Tod Lending (Legacy), Roger Weisberg (Breaking the Cycle), Lee Grant (Confronting the Crisis) and Albert Maysles.

Grünberg is a recipient of Guggenheim, New York Foundation for the Arts, and Soros Justice Media Fellowships.

Documentary films by Grünberg have been screened and some of them made their way to permanent collections of various prestigious institutions, including: Lincoln Center's Walter Reade Theater; the U.S. Holocaust Memorial Museum; Museum of Jewish Heritage in New York; Museo Memoria y Tolerancia, Mexico City; Johannesburg Holocaust & Genocide Centre, South Africa; Menachem Begin Heritage Center in Jerusalem; POLIN Museum of the History of Polish Jews in Warsaw; Museum of Modern Art in New York City; and Yad Vashem in Jerusalem.

Grünberg was a subject of two documentary films by TVP: Movie Stories of Slawek Grünberg (2004, 56 min.) and It All Started with Hillside Ave (2008, 53 min.).

In April 2015, Grünberg completed the production of a partially animated documentary on Jan Karski - Karski & The Lords of Humanity.

In 2018, Grünberg was a subject of a book by Barbara Grünberg titled Slawomir Grünberg: A Man with a Camera.

In June 2019, Grünberg defended his doctoral thesis at Łódź Film School, on the subject "Animated Documentary, effective forms of breaking the rules of documentary filmmaking."

In October 2019, Grünberg completed the production of a partially animated documentary titled Still Life in Lodz.

Later films include I, Kaya – A Girl from Silesia, about Kaya Mirecka-Ploss, scheduled to premiere in 2021; and Hidden Heritage: A Jewish Awakening in Krakow, wscheduled to premiere in 2022.

== Personal life ==
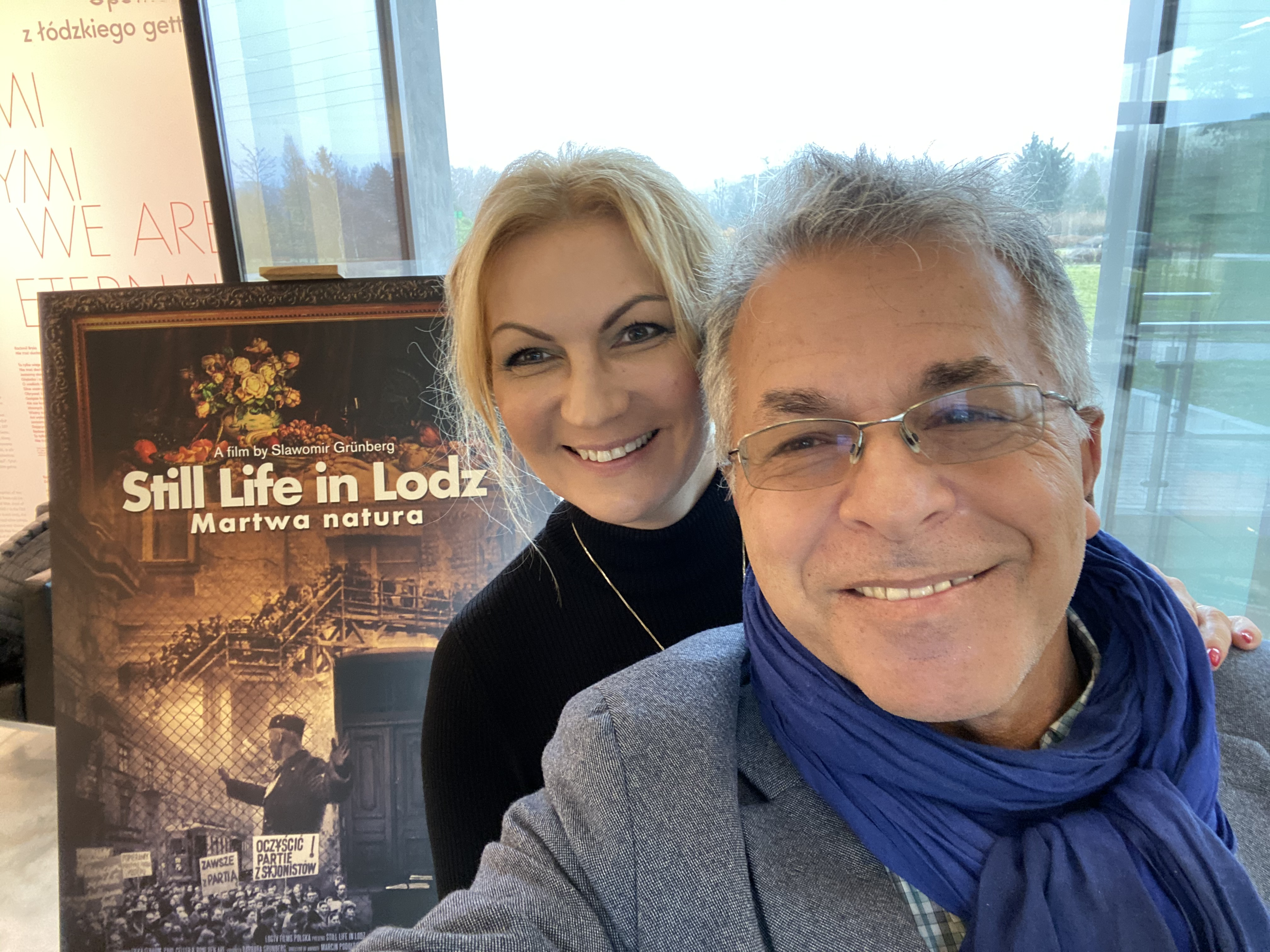
Barbara and Sławomir Grünberg

He is married to Barbara Grünberg.

== Filmography ==
- Still Life in Lodz (Director/Co-Producer/Director of Photography) A large still-life painting hung on the wall above Lilka Elbaum’s childhood bed in Lodz, Poland. It was the first thing she saw when she woke up, and the last thing she saw before she fell asleep. This painting hung on this very spot perhaps since the building was first inhabited in the late 1890s. Until the war these were Jewish families, then during the war, a German family, and then after the war, Lilka’s Jewish family. Hence, the painting ultimately became a silent witness to the tragic history of Lodz’s Jews. 2019, 75 min.
- Don't Cry When I'm Gone (Director/Co-Producer/Director of Photography) This film tells the fascinating story of Wanda, a young woman who survived the Holocaust to become a celebrated Polish poet, songwriter and a TV personality. An insightful psychological portrait of a bohemian artist who loved life, loved to party and adored the attention of men. The Best Documentary Ekran 2018 award (November 22, 2018). 2016, 56 min.
- Karski & The Lords of Humanity (Director/Co-Producer/Director of Photography) A feature-length partially animated documentary project. The film tells the story of Jan Karski, the Polish underground courier who traveled across occupied Europe to inform the Allied powers of Nazi crimes against the Jews of Europe in an effort to prevent the Holocaust. LOGTV, Ltd/APPLE FILM. The Lavr Award – (Russian Film “Oscar”), Grand Prix, International Historical Film Festival, Warsaw; Nomination for the Best Documentary – The Eagles Awards (Polish Film “Oscar”), Best Polish documentary – "Jewish Motives" at International Film Festival, Warsaw, Poland. 2015, 72 and 52 min.
- Shimon's Returns (Co-Director/Producer/Director of Photography) The documentary shot in Poland, Ukraine and Israel tells the story of Shimon Redlich, a Holocaust survivor who returns to places from his childhood as well as different hiding places in his struggle to survive. A collector of memories and a seeker of good will, Shimon takes us on a journey through Poland and Ukraine, uncovering the brighter sides of the darkest of times. 2014, 56 min.
- Castaways (Co-Director/Producer) In the summer of 1943 the Nazis began the last transportation of Jews from the Bialystok region to the Treblinka death camp. Cattle trains with transports of Jews would slow down significantly in Lapy or even stop for a few minutes while the tracks were being adjusted. This is how the idea of trying to save small children by throwing them off the train was born. New York Jewish Film Festival and Gold (Zahav) Award in 2013 Robinson International Short Film Competition. 2013, 18 min.
- Santa Rosa: An Odyssey in the Rhythm of Mariachi. (Director/Co-Producer/Director of Photography) In 1943 a group of 1434 Polish refugees from the Soviet Russia, including a few hundred orphans, arrived in an abandoned ranch of Santa Rosa at the invitation of the Mexican President. Santa Rosa, near Leon, Mexico became their home for the few years to come. 2013, 56 min.
- The Red Button (Co-Producer/Director of Photography) This film that tells the story of Stanislav Petrov, the Russian officer who, in 1983, saved the world from atomic war. As a result of the publicity, he was rewarded by The Association of World Citizens based in San Francisco with $1000 and given a plaque: ‘The World Citizen Award.’ Stanislav Petrov died in 2017. Nominated at the Uranium Film Festival in Rio de Janeiro for the Yellow Oscar 2012, for the best feature film of the festival. 2013, 52 min.
- Coming Out Polish Style (Co-Director/Co-Producer/Director of Photography) Documentary about gay and lesbian life in contemporary Poland in light of ongoing social changes. RAGUSA Film/Polish Film Institute. 2011, 60 min.
- Trans-Action (Director/Director of Photography) Documentary about the intimate process of transsexual transformation of Anna Grodzka, currently the only transgender MP in the world. HBO Central Europe. 2009, 72 min.
- In the Name of Their Mothers: The Story of Irena Sendler by Mary Skinner (Co-Producer/Director of Photography) Irena Sendler, a Polish Catholic social worker, led an underground operation to rescue 2,500 Jewish children out of the Warsaw Ghetto. TVP 1, 2010, 58 min.
- The Peretzniks (Perecowicze) (Director/Co-Producer/Director of Photography) The film tells the story of a Jewish school in Lodz, Poland. The school was shut down following the Communist anti-Semitic campaign, which took place in Poland in 1968. TVP1, 2009, 52 and 90 min.
- Paint What You Remember (Director/Producer/Director of Photography) Mayer was born in 1916 in a small shtetl: Opatow and immigrated to Canada at age 17. Mayer's photographic memory and painting skills allowed him to meticulously recreate Jewish life in Opatow, as it was before the war. 2009, 30 min.
- Portraits of Emotion: The Story of an Autistic Savant (Director/Producer/Director of Photography) This film follows 14-year-old Jonathan Lerman, an artistic prodigy who is diagnosed with autism, an Expression Award at Brazil's Disability Film Festival, 2007, the Grand Prix at the Int. Film Festival "Integration - You and Me", Koszalin, Poland 2008, Grand Prix at the 2010 Belgrade Int. Film Festival, Serbia. 2009, 56 and 79 min.
- Saved by Deportation - An Unknown Odyssey of Polish Jews (Director/Co-Producer/Director of Photography) First feature-length documentary film to tell the dramatic story of Polish Jews who escaped the Holocaust through deportation to the Soviet Union. The Audience Award, Washington Jewish Film Festival, 2006, A Special Award, Jewish Film Festival, Warsaw, ‘Jewish Motifs’. 2009, 56 and 79 min.
- Borderline: The People v. Eunice Baker (Director/Producer/Director of Photography) Documentary about a borderline retarded woman who was sentenced to 15 years to life in prison for the alleged murder of a young child, despite evidence that the death was accidental. Best Documentary Award on a Theme on Disability at the Picture This ...Festival in Calgary, Canada. PBS, Free Speech TV, Link TV, Denmark TV2, Planete Poland, 2005, 56 and 77 min.
- The Legacy of Jedwabne (Director/Producer/Director of Photography) A documentary about the 1941 pogrom in Jedwabne, Poland, explores the implications of the past for present constructions and negotiations of personal, national and religious identity. Special Award at the Crossroads Film Festival, Lublin 2007; PBS, Link TV, Free Speech TV, Danish TV 2, Planete Poland, Polish TV Kultura, Al Jazeera TV, 2005. 56 and 75 min.
- Sister Rose’s Passion (Director of Photography/Line Producer) The film talks about Christian-Jewish relations and Sister Rose Thering passion to educate Christians about the Jews. Oren Jacoby - Director, Best Documentary Short at the Tribeca Film Festival, Academy Award Nomination for the best documentary short in 2005, HBO. 2005, 40 min.
- Fenceline: A Company Town Divided (Co-Producer/Director/Director of Photography). Film depicts the struggle of an African-American community in Louisiana s Cancer Alley to be relocated from under the shadow of a Shell refinery. 2002 San Francisco International Film Festival Award, A Winner of Vermont International Film Festival. PBS/POV, 2002, 57 min.
- Legacy (Co-Director of Photography). Filmed over five years lives of three generations of African-American family. Academy Award Nomination for the best documentary feature in 2001. HBO, 2000, 90 min.
- School Prayer: A Community at War (Co-Producer/Director/Director of Photography) Lisa Herdahl, a Mississippi mother of five, is forced to sue her School District in order to remove the Bible from her children s classrooms. National Emmy Award, The Jan Karski Competition Award, PBS/ P.O.V. 1999, 57 min.
- Shtetl (Second Unit Producer/Director of Photography) Memories of Jewish life in a small town in Poland and a bold look at Jewish/Polish relationship. Silver Baton for Excellence in Radio/Television Journalism by Dupont-Columbia University, Grand Prix at the Cinema du Reel Film Festival in Paris, France in 1996. PBS-Frontline. 1996, 3 hours.
- Chelyabinsk - The Most Contaminated Spot on the Planet (Producer/Director/Editor/Director of Photography). A journey into the horror of nuclear contamination in the Ural region of Russia. Grand Prix - Int. Nature & Environmental Film Festival, in France, 1996, Journalistic Achievement Award, Int. Ecological Film Festival, Germany; 1995. NHK Japan, NOS the Netherlands, SWF Germany, TVP Poland, 1996, 60 min.
- Messenger to Poland (Co-Producer/Editor/Director of Photography) for WTTW s Journal - PBS. Emmy Award (local). 1989, 57 min.
