= Sister Rose's Passion =

2004 film

- DVD cover
- Directed by: Oren Jacoby
- Produced by: Oren Jacoby
- Cinematography: Slawomir Grunberg
- Edited by: Melissa Hacker; Elgin Smith
- Music by: Joel Goodman
- Production company: Storyville Films
- Distributed by: New Jersey Studios
- Release date: 2004
- Running time: 39 minutes
- Country: United States
- Language: English

Sister Rose's Passion is a 2004 American short documentary film directed by Oren Jacoby. It celebrates Sister Rose Thering, for 67 years a Dominican nun, whose passion was combating anti-Semitism. It was nominated for an Academy Award for Best Documentary Short and won the Best Documentary Short Award at the 2004 Tribeca Film Festival.

== Plot ==
Using archival footage, the film traces the life of Rose Thering. Born on August 9, 1920, as the sixth of eleven children, she grew up in Wisconsin and became a Dominican nun at the age of 16. During her upbringing, particularly within her Catholic environment, she was confronted with the narrative that Jews were Christ-killers. She earned her bachelor's degree from the Dominican College in Racine in 1953, followed by a master's degree from the College of St. Thomas in 1957, and finally a doctorate from Saint Louis University four years later.

During her higher education, she encountered Catholic textbooks that she now evaluated critically, and she was shocked by their depiction of Jews. She gathered as much instructional material as possible and analyzed it scientifically, research that was ultimately reflected in her 1961 doctoral dissertation. Her findings contributed directly to the publication of Nostra aetate ("In our time"), a declaration promulgated in 1965 by Pope John XXIII during the Second Vatican Council. From that time forward, her life's mission was to combat antisemitism. The film concludes with a critique of Mel Gibson's The Passion of the Christ.
