= Rose Thering =

American activist (1920–2006)

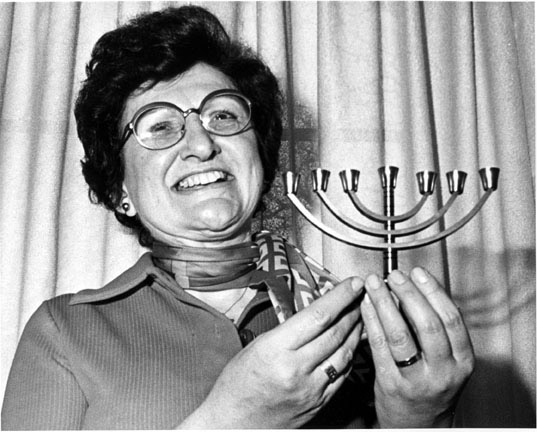

Rose Thering (August 9, 1920 in Plain, Wisconsin – May 6, 2006 in Racine, Wisconsin) was a Roman Catholic Dominican religious sister, who gained note as an activist against antisemitism, educator and a professor of Catholic-Jewish dialogue at Seton Hall University in New Jersey. She played a crucial role in the implementation of the landmark Vatican II document Nostra Aetate, which repudiated anti-Semitism and laid the groundwork for improved relations between Catholics and Jews. A strong advocate for interfaith dialogue and understanding, she participated in numerous conferences, lectures, and seminars aimed at promoting mutual respect and cooperation between people of different faiths. In recognition of her interfaith work, Seton Hall established the Rose Thering Endowment for Jewish-Christian Studies, which provides scholarships for teachers to take courses in this department.

== Biography ==
Rose Elizabeth Thering was born in Plain, Wisconsin, the sixth of 11 children in a German-American farm family that prayed together daily. She entered St. Catherine of Siena Convent of the Racine Dominican Sisters in Racine, Wisconsin at age 16. After taking her permanent vows in the Congregation, she earned a bachelor's degree from Dominican College in Racine in 1953, then a master's degree from the College of St. Thomas in St. Paul, Minnesota in 1957 and, finally a doctorate at Saint Louis University four years later.

Her doctoral dissertation at the Jesuit-run Saint Louis University concerned the treatment of Jews in Catholic textbooks. She was shocked by her findings. The film, Sister Rose's Passion, depicts her recalling how she "almost got ill" reading texts that were used across the country to educate school children. Her work was published later in an anthology, Faith and Prejudice.

In 1962, when Pope John XXIII convened the Second Vatican Council, Cardinal Augustin Bea used Thering's study to draft portions of the 1965 Vatican II document “Nostra aetate” (“In Our Age”), which declared of Christ's death that “what happened in his passion cannot be charged against all the Jews, without distinction, then alive, nor against the Jews of today”. Regarding how this issue was to be handled in catechetical instruction, it added, “The Jews should not be presented as rejected or accursed by God.”

As she recalled later, "They were 15 lines in Latin, but they changed everything.

In 1974, Thering presented a menorah to Pope Paul VI at the Vatican. In 1986, she went to Austria to protest the inauguration of President Kurt Waldheim, the former U.N. secretary-general, who had served in a Nazi army unit implicated in the deportation of Jews from Greece during World War II. In 1987, she went to the Soviet Union to protest the government's treatment of Russian Jews.

At Seton Hall, where she joined the faculty in 1968, she established workshops on Judaism for church leaders and teachers, and led student groups on 54 tours of Israel. Following her teaching career, she was named Professor Emerita at Seton Hall. As a member of a Commission appointed by Gov. Thomas Kean, she helped write a 1994 law mandating the teaching of the Holocaust and genocide in all elementary and high schools in New Jersey.

Later in life, Thering remained an active and vigorous opponent of antisemitism. She received numerous recognitions for her work including; The Woman of Valor Award from the Anti-Defamation League (1993), Cardinal Bea Interfaith Award from the Anti-defamation League (2004), The B'nai B'rith's "Flame of Abraham Award" (1975) as well as a woodland of 2,500 trees presented by the Jewish National Fund, Eleanor Roosevelt Humanities Award, and Myrtle Wreath awarded by N.J. Region of Hadassah. She died, aged 85, from kidney failure in 2006 at her motherhouse in Racine, Wisconsin.

Rabbi Alan Brill continues Sister Rose Thering's work toward interfaith understanding in his role as chair of the Department of Jewish-Christian Studies at Seton Hall University. A documentary film about her activism, Sister Rose's Passion was made in 2004. It was nominated for an Academy Award.

I know the power of teachers. It is my deepest wish that teachers in our public and parochial schools, with scholarship assistance, will be able to enroll in Jewish-Christian studies at Seton Hall University to stem the tide of ignorance in our schools and in society. To be a better Christian you need to find out where you are rooted. Take a good look at Judaism. Our roots are in Judaism. Jewish people have much to teach us. We must learn from our elder brothers and sisters. Read one of Elie Wiesel's books—if you've read Night, read it again. You will find things in there that you didn't understand. Begin with the Hebrew Scriptures, the First Testament. Read a little bit each day, if possible.

On the film, The Passion of the Christ:

In that film there is so much hatred, so much violence you almost forgot what Jesus did. Jesus should have been dead by the time he got to the cross with all that they did to him. In that film you see little Jewish boys turned into devils, and the Jews were all wearing prayer shawls. The whole thing was made as if the Jews killed Jesus, and Pilate came off a saint. from: New York Times obituary
