= Franklin, Sauk County, Wisconsin =

Franklin, Wisconsin
- Town
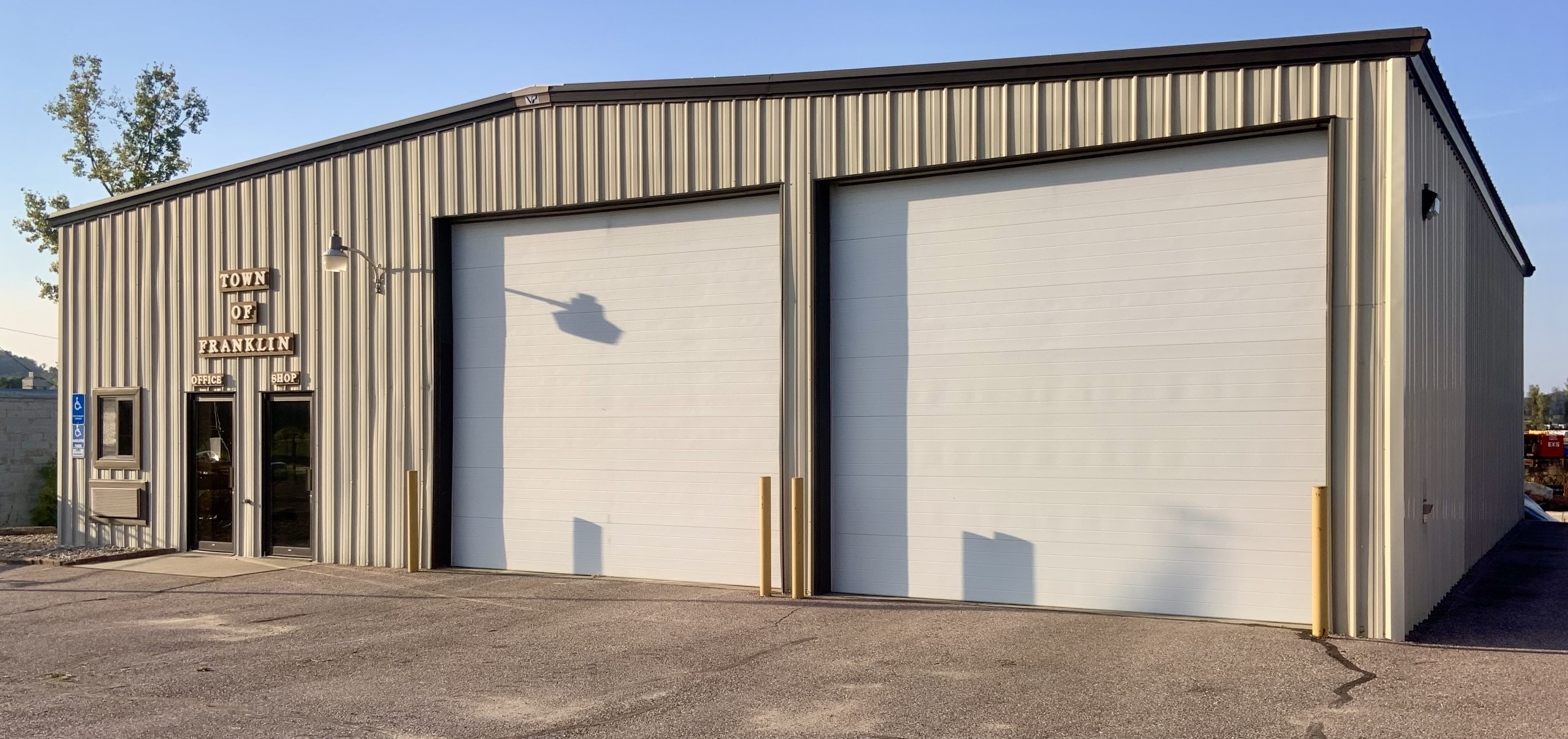
- Town hall in Plain, Wisconsin

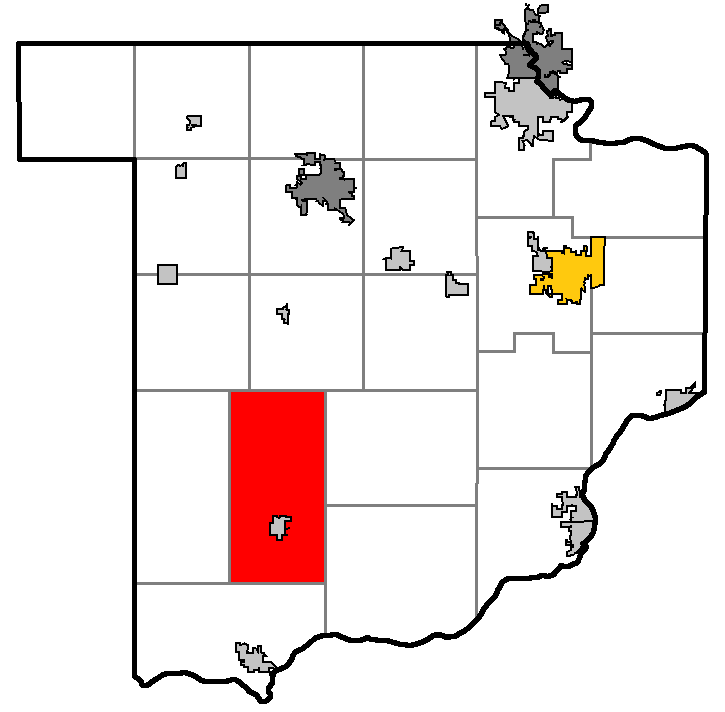
- Location of Franklin, Sauk County, Wisconsin

- Location of Sauk County, Wisconsin
- Coordinates: 43°19′36″N 90°3′2″W
- Country: United States
- State: Wisconsin
- County: Sauk

Area
  - Total: 49.3 sq mi (127.8 km^{2})
  - Land: 49.2 sq mi (127.4 km^{2})
  - Water: 0.15 sq mi (0.4 km^{2})
- Elevation: 810 ft (247 m)

Population (2020)
  - Total: 668
  - Density: 13.6/sq mi (5.24/km^{2})
- Time zone: UTC-6 (Central (CST))
  - Summer (DST): UTC-5 (CDT)
- Area code: 608
- FIPS code: 55-27350
- GNIS feature ID: 1583235
- Website: https://townoffranklinsauk.wixsite.com/town-of-franklin

Franklin is a town in Sauk County, Wisconsin, United States. The population was 668 at the 2020 census.

The town of Franklin was established in November 1854 from part of the town of Honey Creek. In September 1858, the town of Bear Creek was formed from the western part of the town of Franklin. Towns to the north are Westfield and Washington, on the south is Spring Green, on the east are Honey Creek and Troy, and on the west is Bear Creek. In 1899, a town hall building was built by Rob and Albert Nachreiner and was located at 915 Wachter Avenue in Plain, Wisconsin. The building replaced a wagon maker shop owned by Moses Tunstall. The upper floor of the new town hall building was used for town activities while the basement housed a small jail room and fire station for the Village of Plain use. On the top of the town hall was an alarm bell which was later moved to the front of the new fire station about 1980. After the original town hall building was no longer being used, the Old Franklin Township Historical Society (OFTHS) was organized in 2004, and shortly thereafter, used the building to store Plain and Franklin area memorabilia, genealogy, and artifacts in their museum.

The town of Franklin may have been named by early settlers named Cramer who lived previously in Franklin County, Pennsylvania. One source suggested it was named after Benjamin Franklin.

== Geography ==
According to the United States Census Bureau, the town has a total area of 49.3 square miles (127.8 km^{2}), of which 49.2 square miles (127.3 km^{2}) is land and 0.2 square mile (0.4 km^{2}) (0.34%) is water.

== Demographics ==
As of the census of 2000, there were 696 people, 250 households, and 198 families residing in the town of Franklin. The population density was 14.2 people per square mile (5.5/km^{2}). There were 267 housing units at an average density of 5.4 per square mile (2.1/km^{2}). The racial makeup of the town was 98.71% White, 1.01% Native American, and 0.29% from two or more races. Hispanic or Latino of any race were 0.72% of the population.

There were 250 households, out of which 38.4% had children under the age of 18 living with them, 71.6% were married couples living together, 2.8% had a female householder with no husband present, and 20.4% were non-families. 17.2% of all households were made up of individuals, and 7.2% had someone living alone who was 65 years of age or older. The average household size was 2.78 and the average family size was 3.18.

In the town, the population was spread out, with 29.2% under the age of 18, 5.0% from 18 to 24, 31.0% from 25 to 44, 23.6% from 45 to 64, and 11.2% who were 65 years of age or older. The median age was 37 years. For every 100 females, there were 109.0 males. For every 100 females age 18 and over, there were 110.7 males.

The median income for a household in the town was $45,982, and the median income for a family was $49,250. Males had a median income of $30,917 versus $22,500 for females. The per capita income for the town was $18,494. About 4.0% of families and 4.3% of the population were below the poverty line, including 5.6% of those under age 18 and 9.8% of those age 65 or over.
