= Racine Dominican Sisters =

Catholic religious institute for women in Racine, Wisconsin, USA

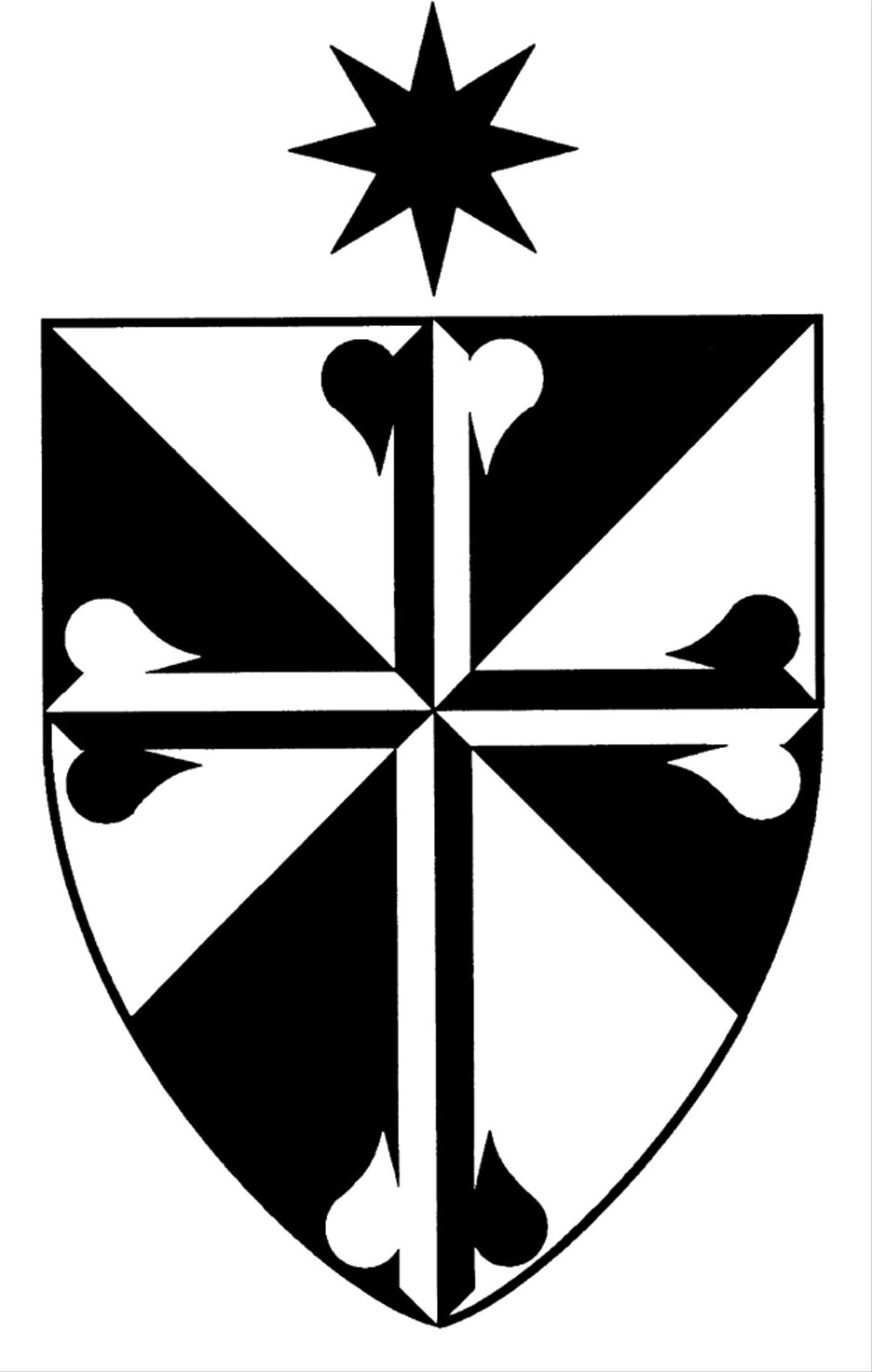
Official shield and banner of St. Catherine's High School, Racine, Wisconsin.

The Congregation of Sisters of St. Dominic of St. Catherine of Siena is a Catholic religious institute for women founded in 1862 in Racine, Wisconsin, USA, in the Archdiocese of Milwaukee.

The Racine Dominicans, as they are known, are a community of vowed women religious and lay associates who live according to the mission: "Committed to truth, compelled to justice". A broader statement of mission is: Commitment to truth in the light of the Gospel compels us to consecrate whatever power we have, personally and as community, to sustain the fundamental right of every person to pursue the fullness of life and to share in the common good. – Constitution - Article 8 (partial).

== Work ==
The religious sisters work or have worked in a variety of ministries throughout the United States and abroad. Ministries have included vocations as prison ministers, counselors, chaplains, social workers, teachers, pastoral associates, musicians, health care workers, artists, attorneys, bakers, spiritual directors, writers, activists, and neighborhood outreach coordinators. Prayer and study are integral to the lives of all Racine Dominican sisters.

Dominicans are considered to be preachers signified by an "OP" (order of preachers) after their names. Dominicans strive to emulate St. Dominic in all of their various ways of preaching and prayer. Racine Dominicans also align themselves with the holiness and wisdom of St. Catherine of Siena. In fact, S. Suzanne Noffke, OP, a foremost authority of St. Catherine of Siena, is a member of the Racine Dominicans. She has written numerous books on St. Catherine of Siena.

Founded in 1862 by Mother Benedicta Bauer and Mother Thomasina Ginker, both from the monastery of Heilig Kreuz in Regensburg, Bavaria, their original mission was to establish a school mainly for German immigrant children.

Their home is Siena Center on the shore of Lake Michigan just north of Racine, Wisconsin and south of Milwaukee. Siena became home to the order in 1962, and they share the campus with Siena Retreat Center, and Shorelight Memory Care, a recently opened ministry (2016).

The Racine Dominicans have begun many significant ministries/organizations, sponsoring them financially and through participation calling them 'sponsored ministries'. Many have become obsolete as the need for a particular service diminished, and many were transferred to other organizations in the greater community as it made sense to do so. The Racine Dominicans currently have six sponsored ministries:

- St. Catherine's High School (est.1864)
- Siena Retreat Center (est. 1966)
- Senior Companion Program (est. 1978)
- Catherine Marian Housing, known as Bethany Apartments (est. 1990)
- Eco-Justice Center or "Rooted in Hope" (est. 2004)
- HOPES Center of Racine (est. 2008)

The more well known Racine Dominican sisters include Rose Thering, professor of Catholic-Jewish dialogue at Seton Hall University and Suzanne Noffke, a scholar and author on Catherine of Siena.

== See also ==
- Dominican nuns
- Sinsinawa Dominican Sisters
