= Santo Hospital of Comillas =

- Santo Hospital de Comillas
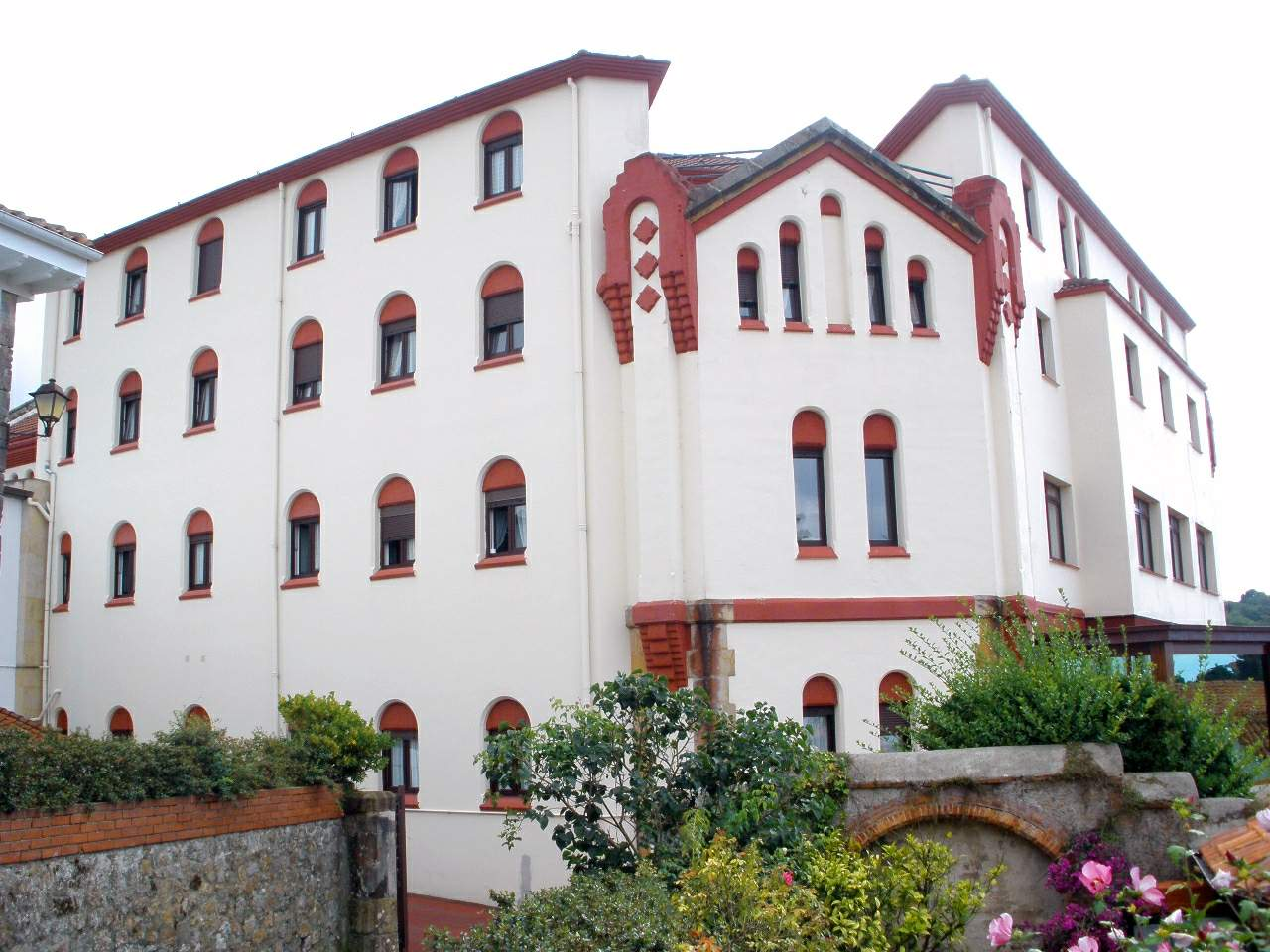
- Santo Hospital of Comillas, designed by Cristóbal Cascante (1885–1888)

General information
- Type: Hospital (now residential home for the elderly)
- Architectural style: Modernisme
- Location: Comillas, Cantabria, Spain
- Client: Claudio López y López and Benita Díaz de Quijano

Design and construction
- Architect: Cristóbal Cascante Colom

The Santo Hospital of Comillas, also known as the Asilo Hospital de Comillas, is a Modernista building located in Comillas, Cantabria, Spain. It was designed by architect Cristóbal Cascante Colom and built between 1885 and 1888 on the commission of Claudio López y López and his wife Benita Díaz de Quijano, who financed its construction as a hospital for the sick and poor of Comillas. Today the building functions as a residential home for the elderly, managed by the Sisters of San José, and is considered part of the remarkable concentration of Modernista architecture in Comillas.

== History ==
Claudio López y López was the brother of Antonio López y López, 1st Marquess of Comillas, the shipping magnate who transformed Comillas into a centre of Catalan Modernisme architecture in the late 19th century. Following the example set by his brother's ambitious building projects in the town — including the Palacio de Sobrellano and the Chapel-Pantheon of Sobrellano Palace — Claudio López y López commissioned Cristóbal Cascante Colom to design a hospital to replace the older Hospital de Santa Cruz, on whose site the new town hall (Ayuntamiento Nuevo) was later built.

Construction took place between 1885 and 1888, with Plácido Díaz de La Campa serving as master builder (maestro constructor). The building is the only major work in Comillas designed independently by Cascante, as opposed to his role as site director for buildings designed by Joan Martorell and Antoni Gaudí. The original architectural plans have not been preserved.

In 1888, a bust of Claudio López y López was installed in the main hall, sculpted by Agapito Vallmitjana.

== Architecture ==
The building is constructed around a central courtyard and reflects the Modernista style, with notable similarities in composition to the nearby Palacio de Sobrellano. The main façade features a stepped porch leading into the chapel of Nuestra Señora del Carmen, which contains a mahogany Neo-Gothic altarpiece. A wooden gallery on the front façade echoes the traditional Cantabrian architectural style (estilo montañés). Two extended sections on the north façade give movement to the composition.

Although the building has undergone several later renovations that altered its original appearance, the wooden gallery and stepped porch remain as characteristic elements of Cascante's design.

== Context ==
The Santo Hospital forms part of the Modernista architectural ensemble of Comillas, which includes the Palacio de Sobrellano (1881–1888) and its Chapel-Pantheon (1881), both by Joan Martorell; El Capricho (1883–1885) by Antoni Gaudí; the Monument to the 1st Marquess of Comillas (1890) by Cascante and Lluís Domènech i Montaner; the Fountain of the Three Spouts (1899) by Domènech i Montaner; and the Pontifical University of Comillas (1882–1892) by Martorell and Domènech i Montaner.
