= Cristóbal Cascante =

Spanish architect (1851–1889)

Cristóbal Cascante Colom
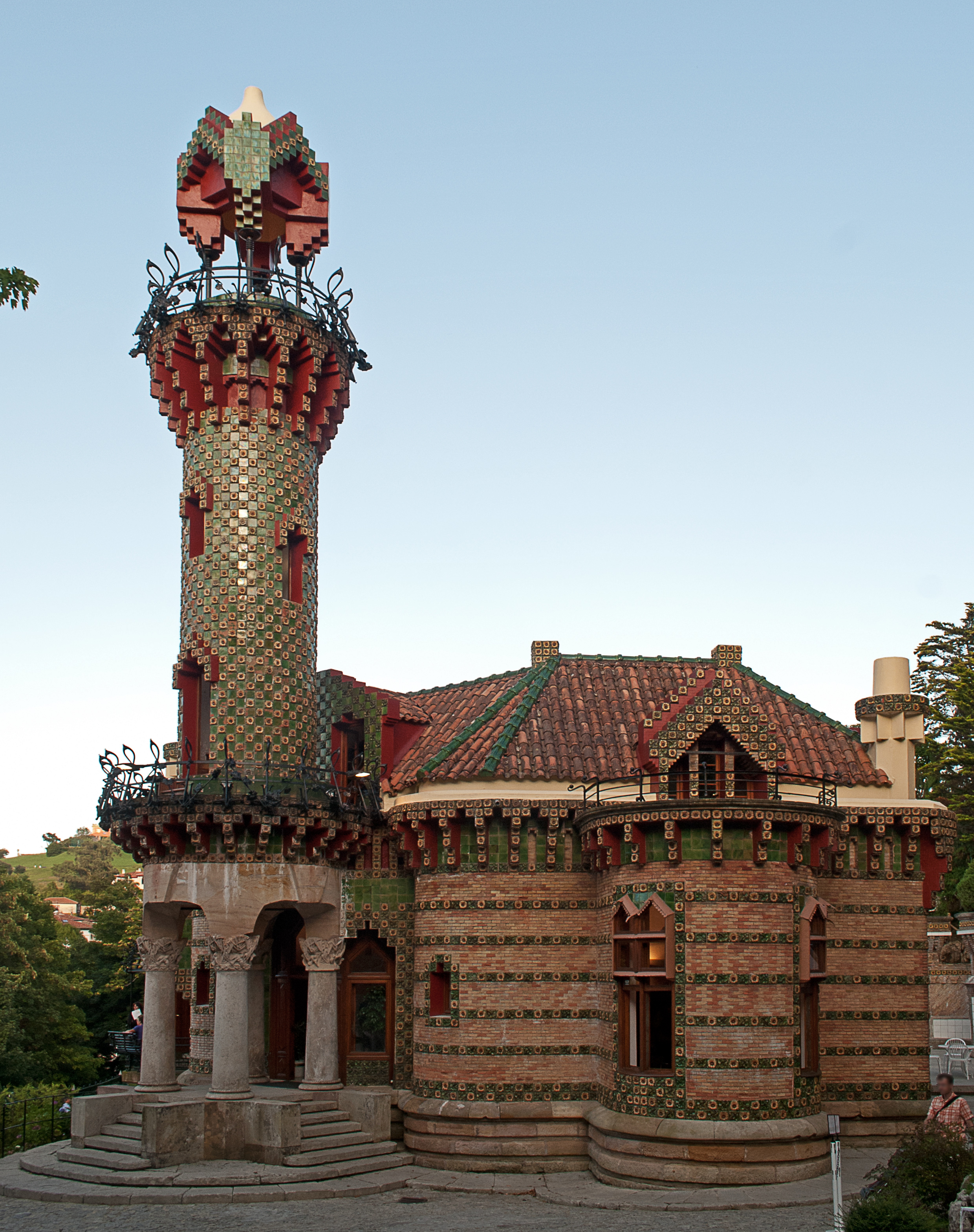
- El Capricho, Comillas, one of the buildings Cascante supervised for Antoni Gaudí
- Born: November 1, 1851; Esparreguera, Catalonia, Spain
- Died: July 12, 1889 (aged 37); Barcelona, Spain
- Occupation: Architect
- Known for: Director of works at Palacio de Sobrellano and El Capricho; classmate and collaborator of Antoni Gaudí

Cristóbal Cascante Colom (November 1851 – July 12, 1889) was a Catalan Modernista architect, best known for his close collaboration with Antoni Gaudí and Joan Martorell on a concentration of late 19th-century architecture in Comillas, Cantabria. He graduated in the same class as Gaudí from the Barcelona School of Architecture in 1878, and the two maintained a close friendship until Cascante's death at the age of 37.

== Early life and education ==
Cascante was born in Esparreguera in November 1851, the son of Cristóbal Cascante Llopart (1810–1891), a textile manufacturer from Monistrol de Montserrat, and María Colom Castells (1809–1879). The family had established a cotton factory in Esparreguera, which burned down in the mid-19th century, forcing the father to work as a manager at the Molí Vell factory owned by the Mercader family in Martorell.

Between 1871 and 1873, Cascante enrolled at the Universitat Literària de Barcelona before entering the Barcelona School of Architecture, from which he graduated on March 15, 1878. His teachers included leading architects of the Renaixença movement, such as Elies Rogent, August Font i Carreras, and Francisco de Paula del Villar. His graduating class included Antoni Gaudí, Eduard Mercader, Pere Falqués, Camil Oliveras, and Leandre Serrallach. While studying, Cascante worked in the sculpture workshop of Venanci Vallmitjana and Agapit Vallmitjana, professors at the Escola de la Llotja in Barcelona, and in the cabinetry workshop of Eudald Puntí.

As early as December 14, 1876, while still a student, Cascante and Gaudí worked together on the restoration of the Virgin's chapel at the Montserrat monastery, under the direction of Francisco de Paula del Villar.

== Career ==
After graduating, Cascante briefly shared an office with Eduard Mercader i Sacanella, with whom he undertook the renovation and extension of the Colegio de Loreto in Barcelona (1878–1890, destroyed by fire in 1909) and the first restoration of the church of Sant Pere de les Puel·les (1883), also in Barcelona.

He soon began collaborating with Joan Martorell and Antoni Gaudí, who entrusted him with the supervision of their works in Comillas, Cantabria, commissioned by Antonio López y López, 1st Marquess of Comillas, and members of his circle including Eusebi Güell and Máximo Díaz de Quijano. Cascante moved permanently to Comillas to oversee these projects, which together represent a remarkable concentration of Catalan Modernisme architecture outside Catalonia.

His most significant works in Comillas include:

- Palacio de Sobrellano (1881–1888): site director for Joan Martorell's Neo-Gothic palace commissioned by the Marquess of Comillas, completed after the death of both the Marquess (1883) and Cascante himself (1889).
- Chapel-Pantheon of Sobrellano (1881): site direction of the adjacent funerary chapel, also designed by Martorell.
- El Capricho (1883–1885): Gaudí, working from Barcelona, entrusted Cascante with the on-site direction of this pavilion commissioned by Máximo Díaz de Quijano.
- Comillas Hospital (Santo Hospital) (1885–1888): designed and built by Cascante on commission from Claudio López Bru, 2nd Marquess of Comillas.
- Monument to the 1st Marquess of Comillas (1885/1890): Cascante designed the monument, which was ultimately executed in 1890 by Lluís Domènech i Montaner following Cascante's death, retaining the basic design with some modifications.
- Pontifical University of Comillas (1882–1889): co-designed with Martorell; Cascante directed construction until his death, after which Domènech i Montaner completed the building.

== Final work and death ==
Cascante's last project was Can Casas (also known as Cellers Müller), a winery in el Bruc, begun in 1888 during one of his stays in Catalonia. He did not live to see it completed; he died suddenly in Barcelona on July 12, 1889, at the age of 37.

== Legacy ==
Cascante's career, though brief, was representative of the medievalist strand of the Catalan Renaixença. His architectural output reflects the direct influence of Elies Rogent and, through his collaborations, the broader orbit of Gaudí and Martorell. His work in Comillas — carried out far from the Catalan cultural milieu in which it originated — made the town a unique showcase of Catalan Modernista architecture and contributed to Comillas's later designation as a site of outstanding architectural heritage.

The buildings he supervised, including the Palacio de Sobrellano, the Chapel-Pantheon, and El Capricho, were collectively declared Bien de Interés Cultural (Assets of Cultural Interest) by the Government of Cantabria.
