= Chapel-Pantheon of Sobrellano Palace =

Neo-Gothic chapel-pantheon in Comillas, Cantabria, Spain

- Capilla-Panteón del Palacio de Sobrellano
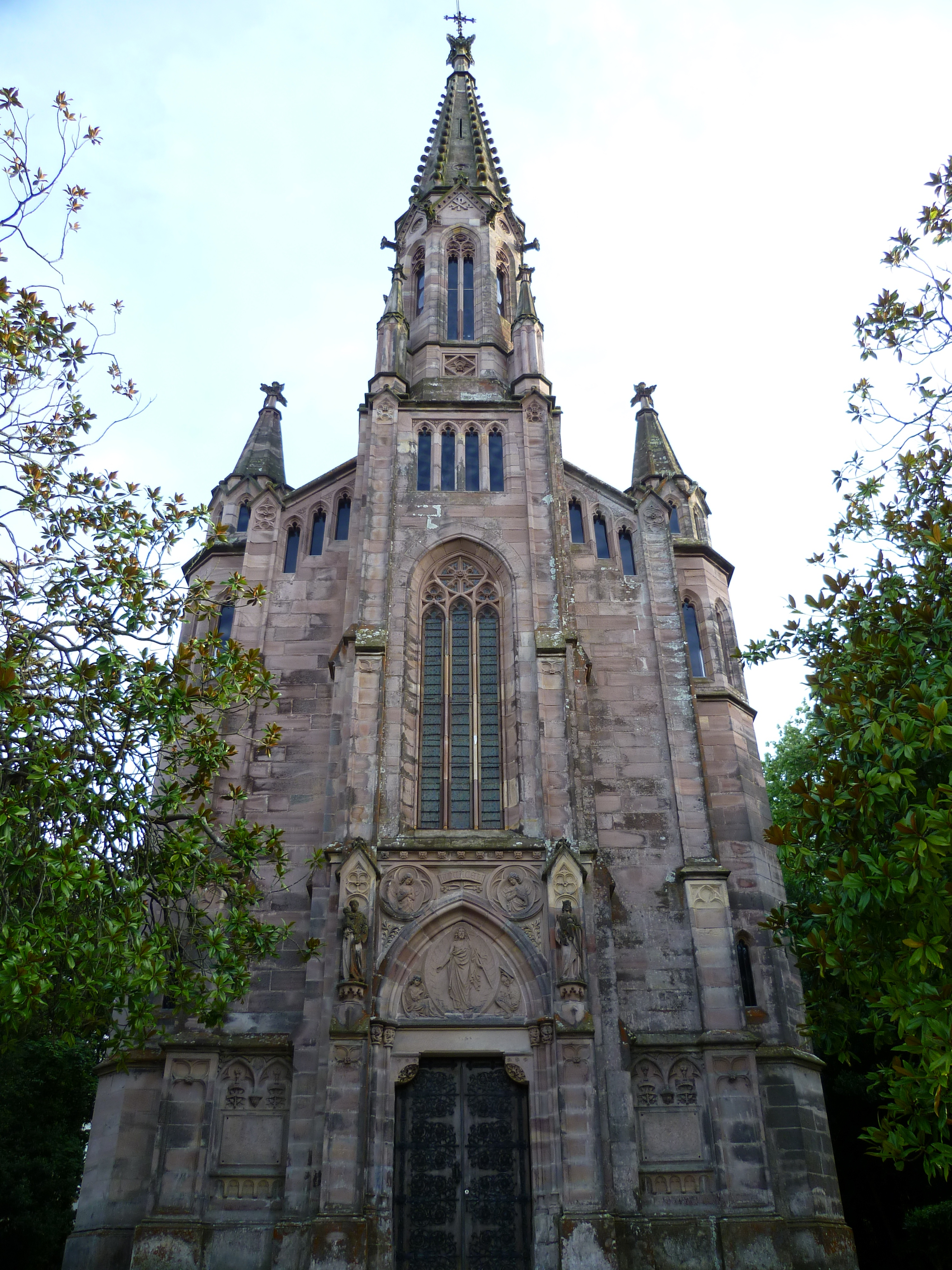
- Facade of the Chapel-Pantheon

Religion
- Affiliation: Roman Catholic

Location
- Location: Comillas, Cantabria, Spain
- Country: Spain
- Interactive map of Chapel-Pantheon of Sobrellano Palace
- Coordinates: 43.3836°N 4.2935°W

Architecture
- Architect: Joan Martorell
- Groundbreaking: 1880
- Completed: 1881
- Designated: 2002

The Chapel-Pantheon of Sobrellano Palace is a Neo-Gothic funerary chapel located in Comillas, Cantabria, Spain, adjacent to the Palacio de Sobrellano. It was designed by Catalan architect Joan Martorell and built between 1880 and 1881 on the commission of Antonio López y López, the first Marquess of Comillas. In 2002 the chapel, together with the adjacent palace and park, was declared a Bien de Interés Cultural (Asset of Cultural Interest) with the category of Monument.

Despite its small size, the building was conceived as a miniature cathedral and functions both as a family mausoleum and as a chapel for religious services. It contains furniture designed by Antoni Gaudí and sculptural works by leading Catalan Modernista artists. Today it is owned by the Government of Cantabria and is open to the public through guided tours.

== History ==
Antonio López y López, born into a humble fishing family in Comillas, amassed a vast fortune in Cuba before returning to Spain and being ennobled as the first Marquess of Comillas in 1878. Seeking to adapt his properties to his new social position, he commissioned architect Joan Martorell to design both a chapel-pantheon and a palace in Comillas, with the aim of attracting King Alfonso XII to make the town a royal summer destination.

The chapel-pantheon was the first of the two buildings to be completed. Martorell's project dates from July 1878, and construction began in 1880. The premature death of the Marquess's eldest son, Antonio López y Bru, in 1876, followed shortly by that of his sister María Luisa, had made the construction of a family mausoleum particularly urgent. The building was consecrated on 28 August 1881 during a royal visit to Comillas by Alfonso XII and Queen María Cristina, and was blessed by the Marquess's family chaplain, the poet Jacinto Verdaguer.

The adjacent Palacio de Sobrellano, also designed by Martorell, was built between 1881 and 1888. Both buildings form part of a remarkable concentration of Catalan Modernisme architecture in Comillas, alongside El Capricho by Antoni Gaudí and the Pontifical University of Comillas.

== Architecture and fittings ==
The building follows the style of English and Central European Perpendicular Gothic, designed to evoke a cathedral in miniature, complete with a full ambulatory (girola). The exterior features gargoyles and characteristic Neo-Gothic stonework. Site supervision during construction was shared by Cristóbal Cascante and Camil Oliveras, both classmates of Antoni Gaudí.

The interior is notable for several outstanding works:

- Furniture by Antoni Gaudí: the choir stalls (sitiales), prayer stools (reclinatorios), and pews were all designed by Gaudí, representing some of his earliest commissioned works.
- Stained glass: the polychrome stained glass windows were made in the workshops of Eudald Ramon i Amigó.
- Altar: crafted in the workshops of Francisco Paula Isaura y Fragas.
- Organ: the chapel organ is the work of Cayetano Vilardebó.

== Pantheon ==
The ambulatory houses the funerary monuments of the López family, executed by leading Catalan sculptors:

- The pantheon of Claudio López y López and his wife Benita Díaz de Quijano features the sculptures La Plegaria (The Prayer) and La Resignación (Resignation) by Josep Llimona.
- The pantheon of Claudio López Bru, 2nd Marquess of Comillas, features a recumbent Christ by Agapito Vallmitjana.
- The pantheon of Antonio López y López, 1st Marquess of Comillas, and his wife María Luisa Bru Lassús, features a relief by Venancio Vallmitjana, based on a design by Joan Martorell.
