= Cascante (surname) =

De La Torre
- Language: Spanish

Origin
- Meaning: "Waterfall"
- Region of origin: Spain, Colombia, Ecuador, Costa Rica

Other names
- Variant form: de Cascante

Cascante is a Spanish surname meaning "waterfall". It may refer to:

== People ==
- Álvaro Cascante (born 1945), Costa Rican footballer
- Cristóbal Cascante (1851–1889), Catalan architect
- Francisco Cascante (1920–1999), Cuban gymnast
- Haydee Gómez Cascante (1926–2024), Costa Rican nurse and educator
- Hermidio Barrantes Cascante (born 1964), Costa Rican footballer
- Julio Cascante (born 1993), Costa Rican footballer
- Rodrigo Hernández Cascante (born 1996), Spanish footballer
- Nazareth Cascante (born 1990), Costa Rican model
