= Sant Esteve de Castellar del Vallès =

Sant Esteve de Castellar
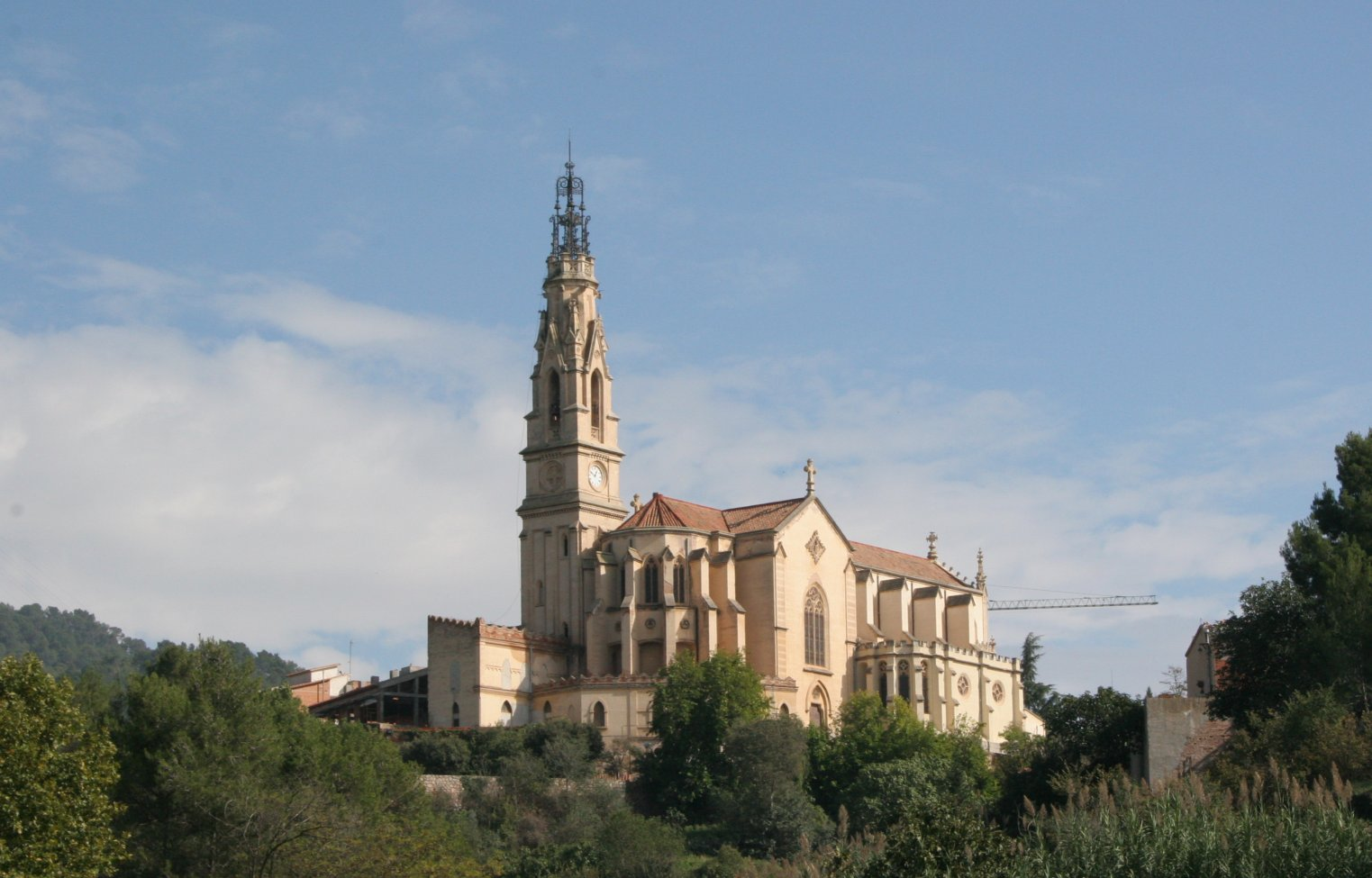

General information
- Architectural style: Gothic Revival architecture
- Location: Castellar del Vallès
- Country: Spain
- Coordinates: 41°37′26″N 2°5′27″E

Sant Esteve de Castellar del Vallès is the parish church of Castellar del Vallès, in the comarca of Vallès Occidental.

The church was built between 1885 and 1892 with the patronage of Emília Carles Tolrà, a local businesswomen. The project is the work of architect Joan Martorell i Montells, while sculptor Rossend Nobas was in charge the façade and the tympanum. The crypt of the church houses the Tolrà family, consecrated on 25 June 1892. The church is a very prominent example of Neo-Gothic architecture in Catalonia.

Due to its large dimensions and its beauty, it is known as "the Cathedral of the Vallès"

As a result of the religious persecution and secularism during the Spanish Civil War, the church was damaged and stripped of its art works. It was consecrated again in 1952 and was restored between 1984 and 1993.
