= Marquess of Comillas =

Spanish nobility title

- Creation date: 3 July 1878
- Created by: Alfonso XII
- Peerage: Peerage of Spain
- First holder: Antonio López y López, 1st Marquess of Comillas
- Present holder: María de los Reyes Güell y Merry del Val, 5th Marchioness of Comillas

Marquess of Comillas (Spanish: Marqués de Comillas) is a hereditary title in the Spanish nobility, accompanied by the dignity of Grandee. On 3 July 1878, the title Marquess of Comillas was granted to Antonio López y López by the King Alfonso XII, in recognition of his contribution to the town of Comillas in northern Spain. The title recalls the name of his hometown.

The first Marquess of Comillas built a gothic palace in Comillas in 1888. Its architect was Joan Martorell, renowned Catalan architect. The Palace of Sobrellano, as it is known, was the first building in Spain to make use of electrical lighting, patented by Thomas Edison a year before its construction.

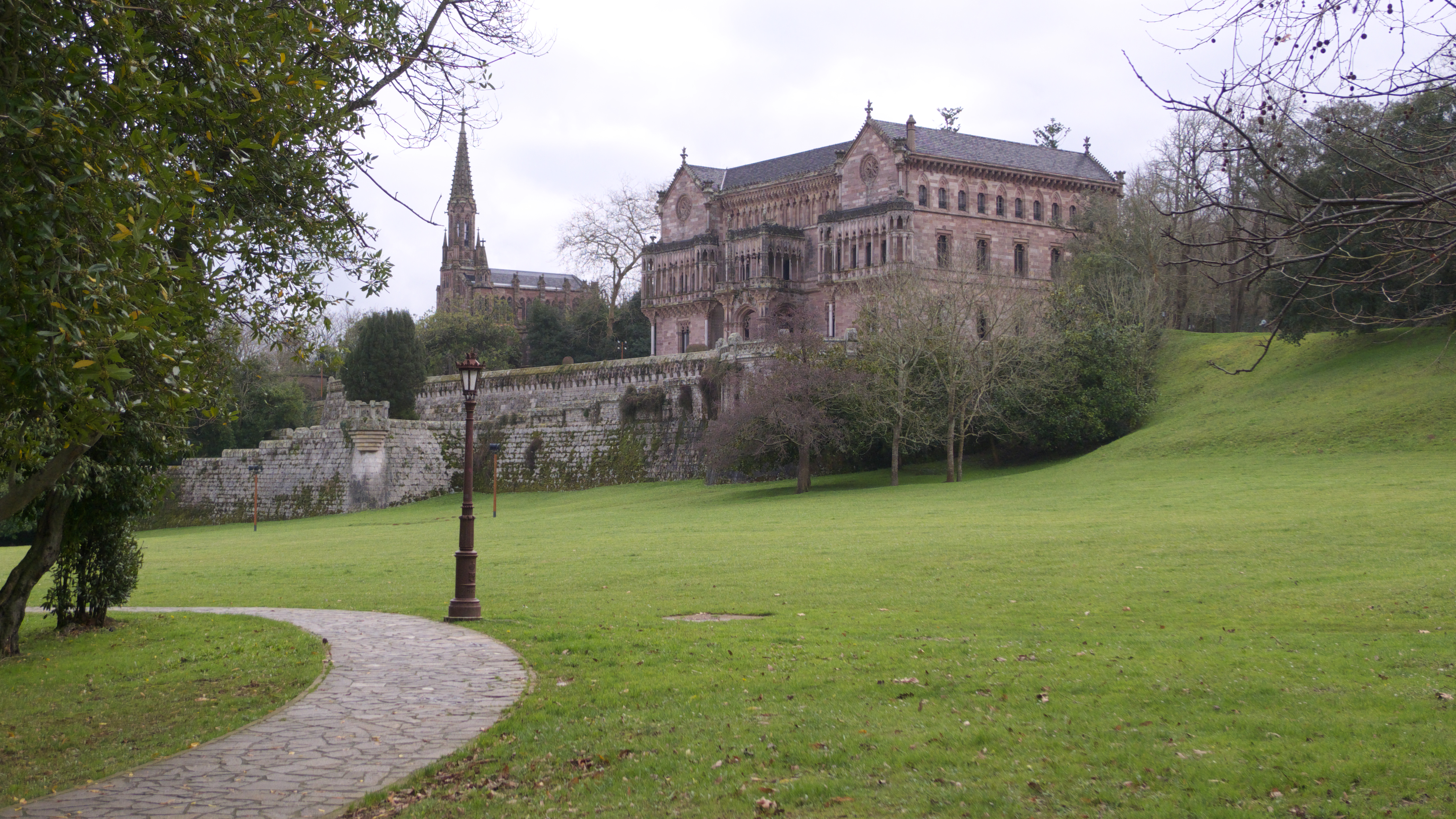
Palace of Sobrellano, original seat of the Marquesses of Comillas, in Comillas, Spain

The current marquesses of Comillas are also the Counts of Güell. The third marquess was also the 2nd Count of Güel and the 6th Count of Ruiseñada .

== Marquesses of Comillas ==
- Antonio López y López, 1st Marquess of Comillas (1878–1883)
- Claudio López y Bru, 2nd Marquess of Comillas (1883-1925), son of the 1st Marquess
- Juan Antonio Güell y López, 3rd Marquess of Comillas (1925-1958), grandson of the 1st Marquess
- Juan Alfonso Güell y Martos, 4th Marquess of Comillas (1958-), grandson of the 3rd Marquess
- María de los Reyes Güell y Merry del Val, 5th Marchioness of Comillas, daughter of the 4th Marquess

== See also ==
- List of current grandees of Spain
