= El Capricho =

Coordinates: 43°23′01″N 4°17′34″W

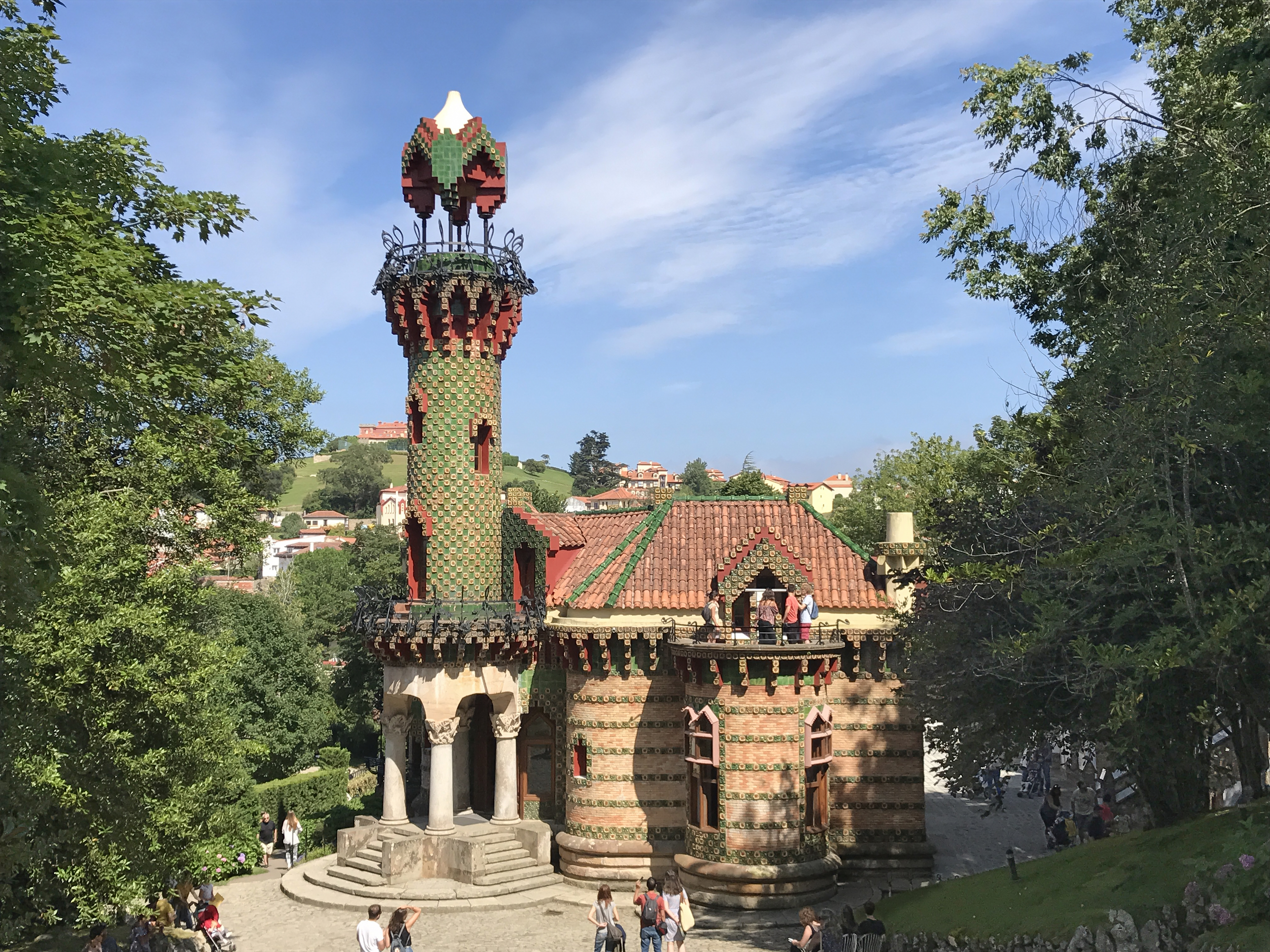
- Interactive map of the El Capricho area

General information
- Location: Comillas (Cantabria), Spain

Design and construction
- Architect: Antoni Gaudí

Spanish Cultural Heritage
- Official name: Villa El Capricho
- Type: Non-movable
- Criteria: Monument
- Designated: 24 July 1969
- Reference no.: RI-51-0003828

El Capricho is a villa in Comillas (Cantabria), Spain, designed by Antoni Gaudí. It was built in 1883–1885 for the summer use of a wealthy client, Máximo Díaz de Quijano, who died a year before the house was completed.

Gaudí, who designed only a small number of buildings outside Catalonia, was involved with other projects at Comillas. He was the assistant of Joan Martorell on another summer residence, the Palacio de Sobrellano.

El Capricho belongs to the architect's orientalist period, during the beginnings of Gaudi's artwork. El Capricho allows to see all the foundations on which Modernisme is based, anticipating Europe's avant-garde Art Nouveau. The tower has been compared to a minaret. After the death of Máximo Díaz de Quijano, this building was used such as a summer house for the most economically and politically powerful people.

The building fell into disrepair after the Spanish Civil War, a state in which it continued despite being declared a National Monument in 1969. In 1977, the last descendant of the López-Díaz de Quijano family sold the property and it was restored and turned into a restaurant in 1988. Finally, in 2009, the building became a museum.

== Design ==
El Capricho is one of the many marvels created by the esteemed architect Antoni Gaudi. In this project, Gaudi displayed his extensive knowledge of problem-solving and architectural styles to make a combined testimony of history and his own unique way.

=== The Tower ===
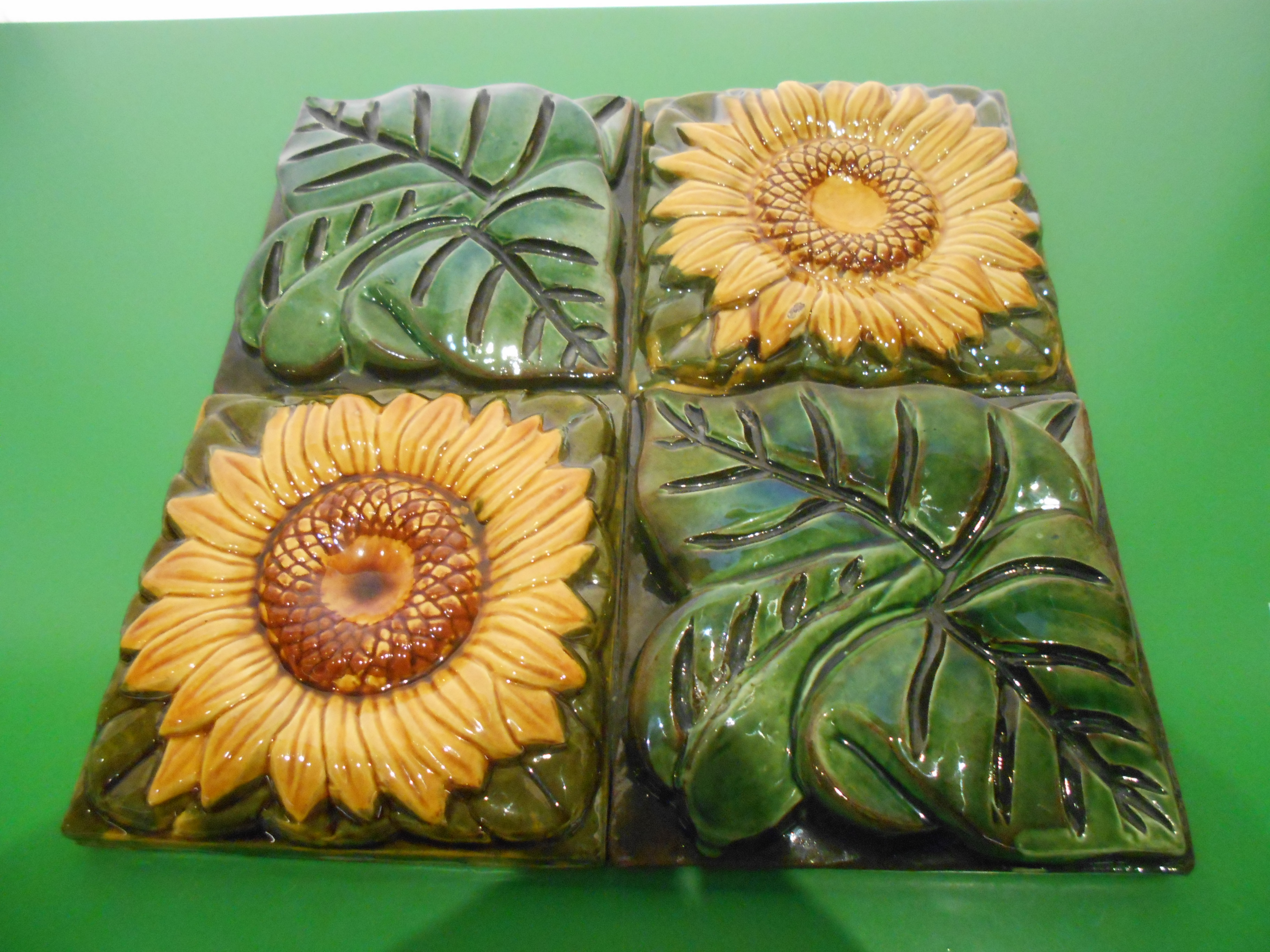
Image of the Sunflower & Leaf clay tiles up close used all over the exterior of the El Capricho

The Tower of El Capricho is covered with beautiful ceramic tiles that alternate between bright yellow sunflowers and green subtle leaves. The top of the minaret tower was done with an arabesque finish. Also notable to mention that at the base of the tower, four classical columns provide support to the heavy tower. While these columns provide support for the tower, the bright white stone also acts as a great contrast from the red brick and vibrant ceramic tiles that encase the exterior of this building. Above the columns is a balcony where people can view the landscape from a higher vantage point and get a closer look at the intricate tiles on the tower. Then a steel spiral staircase takes you up the tower to get a fantastic view of Comillas.

=== The House ===
The House has 3 floors which are all identifiable by the materials they were built with on the exterior. The basement was built from large stone bricks, the Main floor was made up of smaller red bricks, and the upper floor/ attic area is defined by the beautifully sloped roof and ceramic tiles. The house is rather small but it holds a lot of functions and has many different rooms to fit the needs of the patron.

The house also uses many large windows allowing for the use of more natural lighting inside the house. Interestingly, Gaudi uses influence from Gothic Architecture by using pointed arches to frame the windows of the house. Shown as just another way of Gaudi pulling from different cultures and architectural styles to implement into his work.

El Capricho was built on the outskirts of Comillas and in the middle of the countryside so that its patron could have a getaway from all of the business of the city.

== See also ==
- List of Gaudí buildings
