= Claudio López, 2nd Marquess of Comillas =

Spanish businessman and shipping magnate

The Most Excellent Servant of God The Marquess of Comillas GE
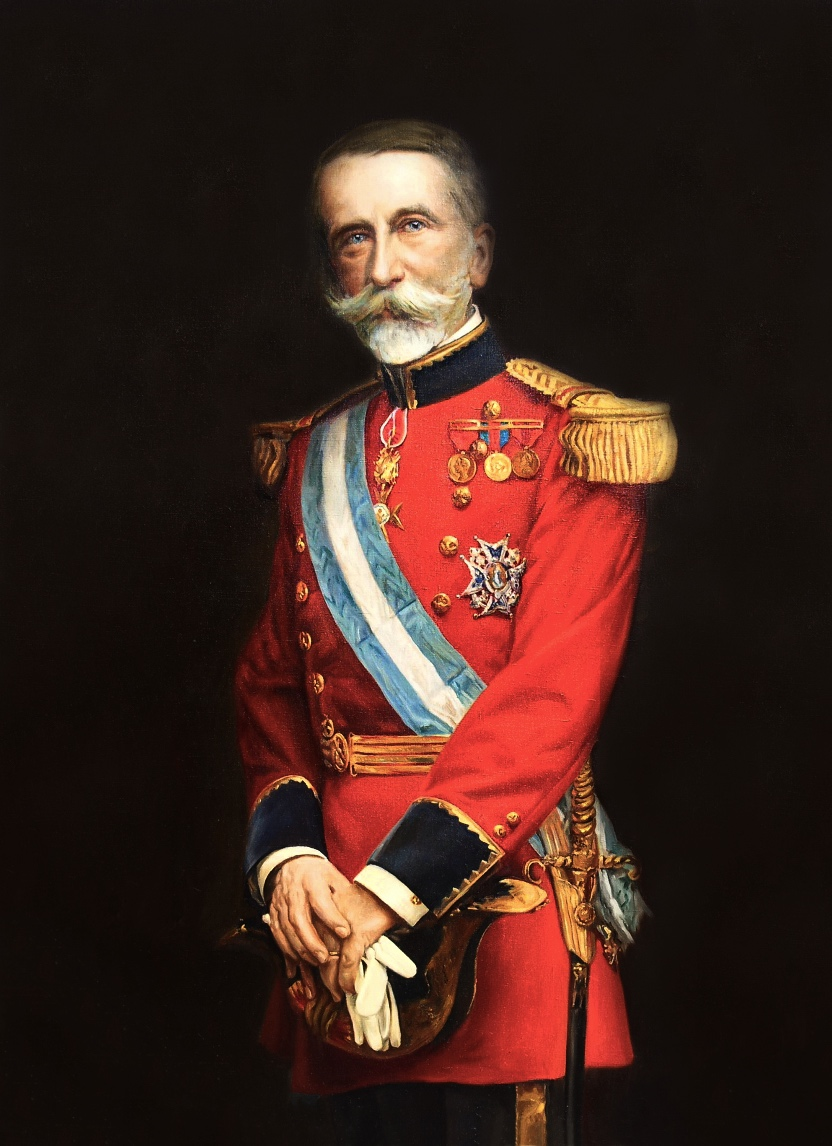
- Oil on canvas, by Francisco Godoy

Personal details
- Born: 14 May 1853 Barcelona, Spain
- Died: 18 April 1925 (aged 71) Madrid, Spain
- Spouse: María Gayón Barrie

Claudio Bru López, 2nd Marquess of Comillas, GE (14 May 1853 – 18 April 1925), was a Spanish peer, businessman, and immensely rich shipping magnate and landowner. He inherited the companies his father Antonio L. Lopez had founded.

For thirty years, from 1895 to 1925, the Marquess of Comillas dominated Catholic policy-making on labour relations.

Comillas sponsored Antoni Gaudí's trip to Tangier and Tétouan in 1892, where the architect was inspired by Franciscan José María Lerchundi to design a complex for Catholic Missions in Tangier. The project was never realized but was a source of inspiration for Gaudí's lifelong endeavor the Sagrada Família.

== Biography ==
Claudio Bru López was born in Barcelona on 14 May 1853. He was the fourth son of Antonio López López — the founder and owner of Compañía Transatlántica Española and Compañía General de Tabacos de Filipinas — and Catalan lady Luisa Bru Lassús.

He studied law at Barcelona University. In 1883, following his father's death, he inherited the title "Marquess of Comillas". Barely in his thirties, he ran all the companies his father had started, foremost of which were Compañia General de Tabacos de Filipinas and Ferrocarriles del Norte. In the following years, Claudio himself would expand his father's estate, with coal company Hullera Española, Blanca Bru López, Constructora Naval and Banco Vitalicio.

He promoted the Pontifical Seminary of Comillas (Cantabria) that had been financed by his father. The first building was inaugurated in 1890 and through a decree of the Vatican, it became the Pontifical University of Comillas

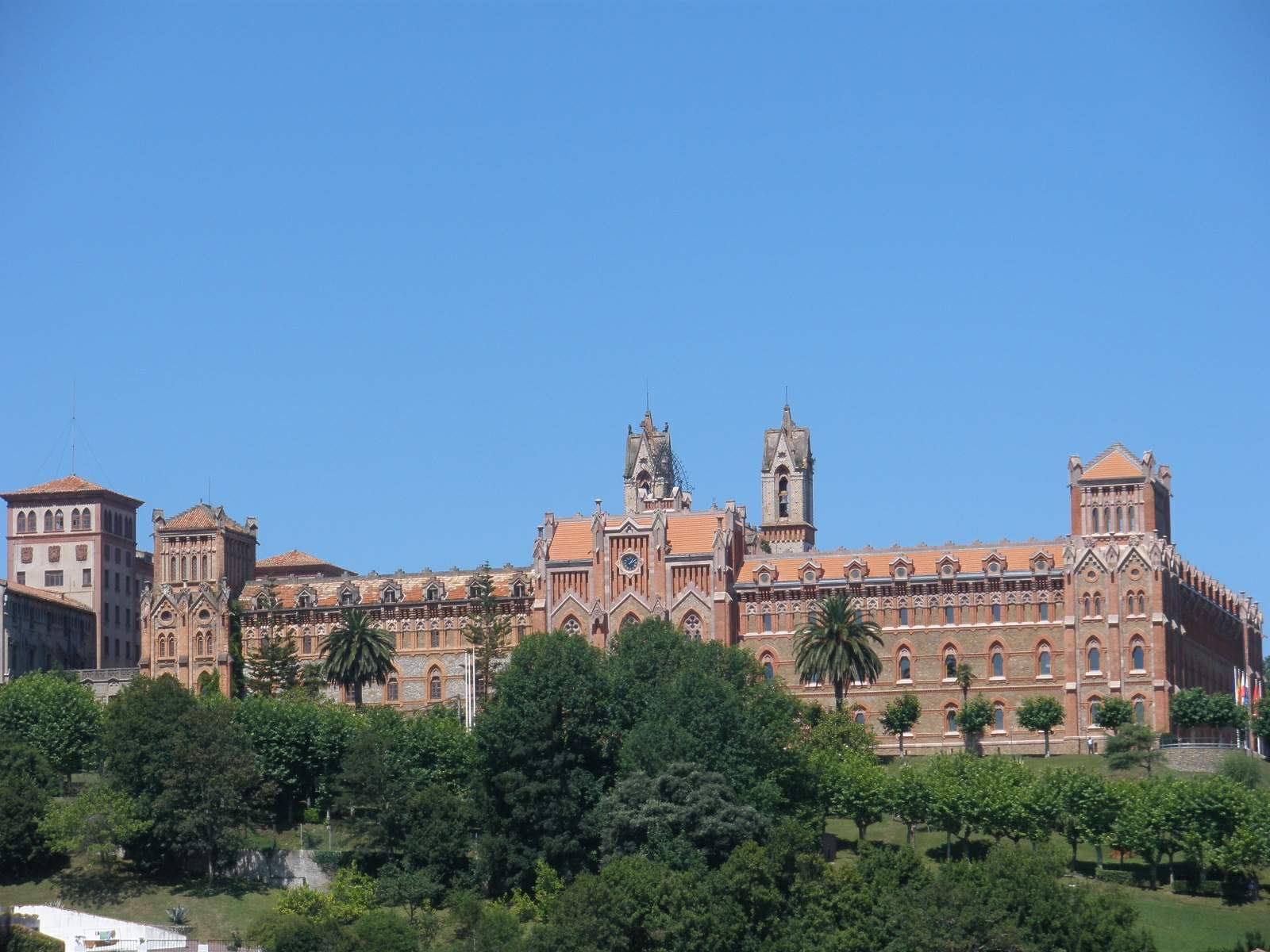
Comillas Pontifical University, which he promoted

In 1893 vessel Cabo Machichaco, a ship not belonging to Claudio's CTE shipping line, exploded at the harbor in Santander. The explosion was of such magnitude that a thick mooring cable from the ship hit Peñacastillo, 8 km away, killing a person. Santander harbor was destroyed and the death toll reached 500.

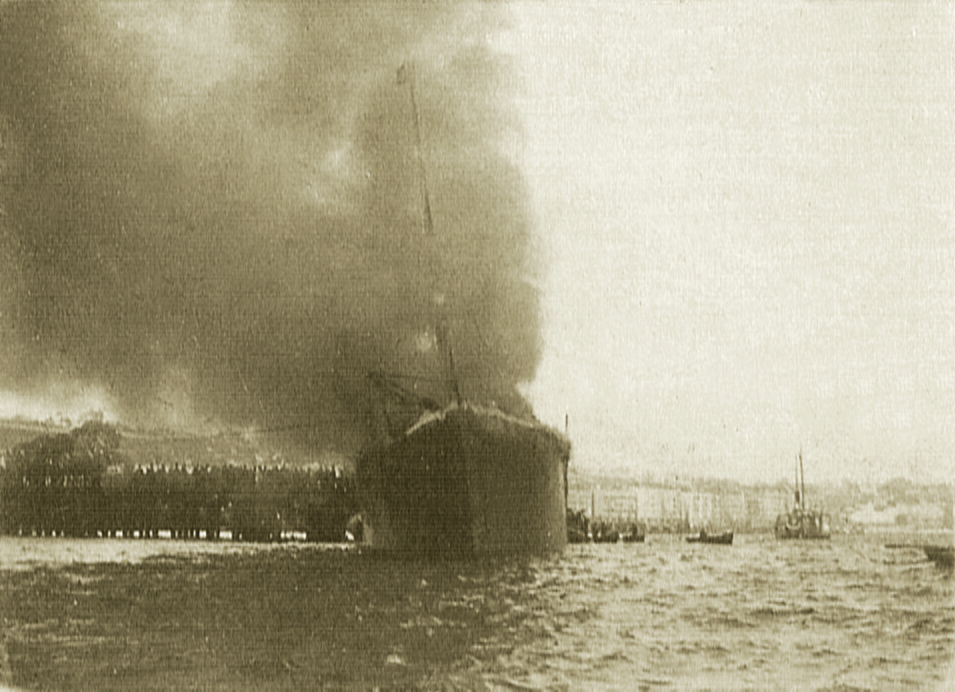
Ship Cabo Machichaco after the explosion

As soon as he got the news, Claudio went to the spot and sent a train from Barcelona with doctors, nurses, firemen and medical equipment in order to treat the thousands of wounded.

After this action, Claudio consistently refused any attempt by the authorities to honor and reward him, stating simply that he had done merely his duty as a Christian.

He acted similarly after the 1908 Messina earthquake that devastated this Italian town, causing tens of thousands of deaths. Claudio had his ship, the "Cataluña", one of his CTE vessels, transformed into a hospital and sent it rushing to the place.

A process of beatification began in 1945. His cause was formally opened on 22 December 1947, granting him the title of Servant of God.

== Labour relations ==
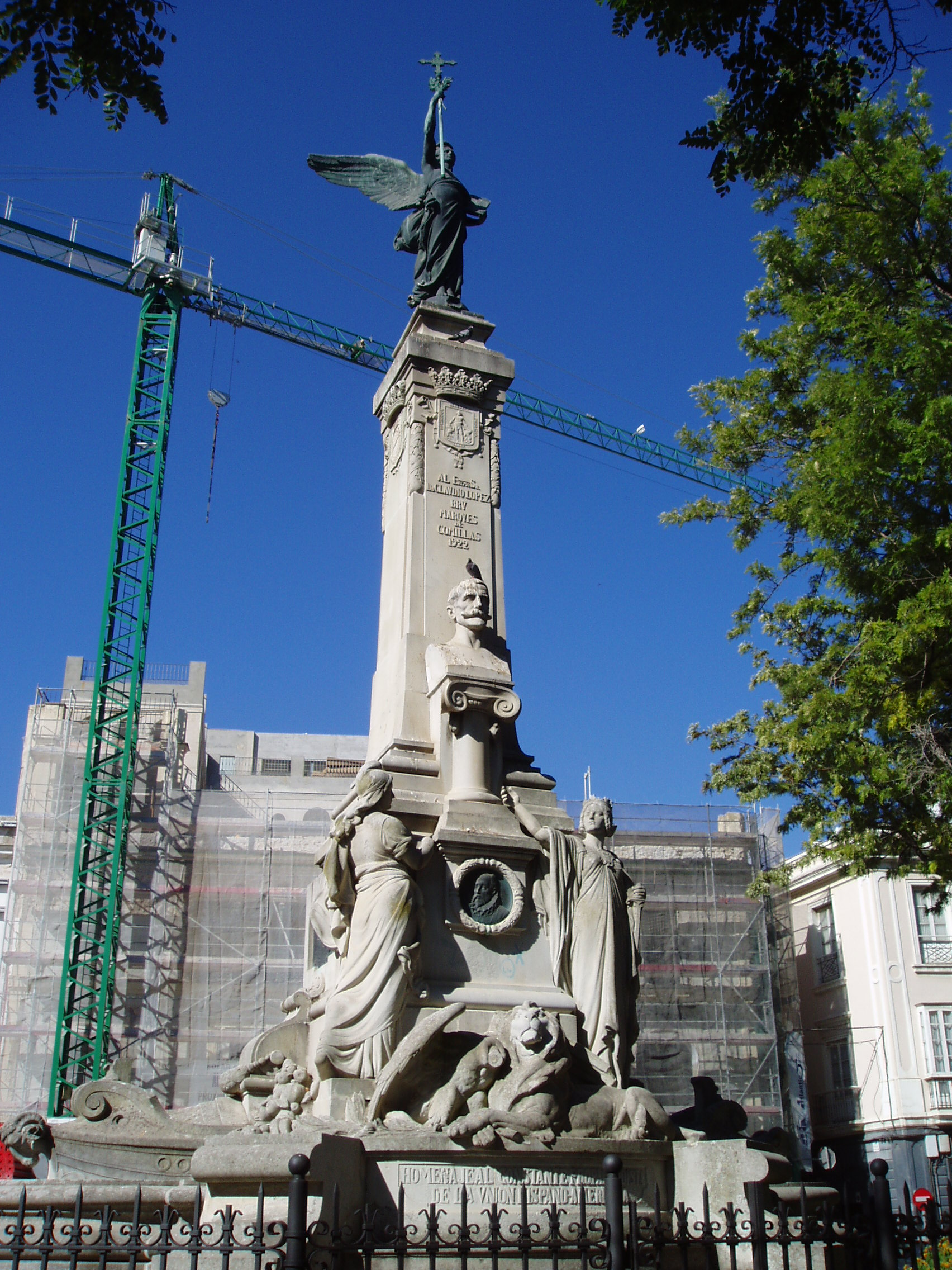
Monument to the Marquess of Comillas in Cádiz, Spain

Coat of Arms as Marquess of Comillas (1883–1925)

A Catholic, he was determined, according to a writer on the Spanish Catholic world, Frances Lannon, 'to keep his employees pious and out of radical unions.' He was a dominating influence in the National Council of Catholic Worker Corporations CNCCO, a kind of industrial branch of Catholic Action. A reactionary he was criticized by the Asturian priest Maximiliano Arboleya Martínez who commented that: "The workers in our Circles are talked to about religion, about morality, about resignation, about their obligations - it is almost never that anyone talks to them about the injustices, about the obligations of the capitalists".

Claudio was a dominant figure in determining Catholic policy on labour relations. A workers section of Catholic Action was set up under his influence in 1894, followed in 1919 by a women's, and in 1924 by a youth section. They were firmly under hierarchical and magnate control, 'associations of leaders with few followers.'

The most characteristic efflorescences of Catholic Action at this time were words and gestures rather than purposeful organisations, congresses and processions rather than flourishing workers' associations. Claudio financed spectacular pilgrimages for working men to shrines in Spain and abroad. And, impressed by the Catholic Railwayman's syndicate, led by Agustin Ruiz, and its performance in opposing the railway strike of July 1916 and the general strike of August 1917, tried hard to create an accompanying web of Catholic miners syndicates, especially in the militant Asturian pits, where he himself owned pits.

Claudio was also influential in the Popular Social Action (ASP) initiative, founded by a Jesuit priest, Gabriel Palau, in 1907 in Barcelona. Palau wanted to make Barcelona the centre of a national network of social Catholic initiatives. It attracted bourgeois Catholics, and its financial needs were largely met by the Marquess of Comillas. The syndicates that became associated with the ASP were called Professional Unions. "A recent study has emphasised their paternalism – at the most generous calculation they never accounted for more than 2% of the Barcelona manual work-force. They soon established a reputation as strike breakers." Claudio was an opponent of the Sindicatos Libres of Pedro Gerard, a Dominican who was convinced that workers must receive adequate wages, as of right, not merely subsistence wages. His Free Syndicates opposed the general strike of 1917 along with their confessional counterparts but the extreme conservatism of Claudio still found Gerard uncongenial and, : "one whose ideas if put into practice would cost capitalists like the Marquess of Comillas much more in higher wages than they paid into syndicate subventions and mass pilgrimages."

== See also ==
- Compañía Transatlántica Española
- Antonio L. López (shipwreck)

Spanish nobility
Preceded by Antonio López	Marquess of Comillas; 1883–1925	Succeeded by Juan Antonio Güell
