= Palacio de Sobrellano =

Neo-Gothic palace in Comillas, Cantabria, Spain

- Palace of the Marquess of Comillas
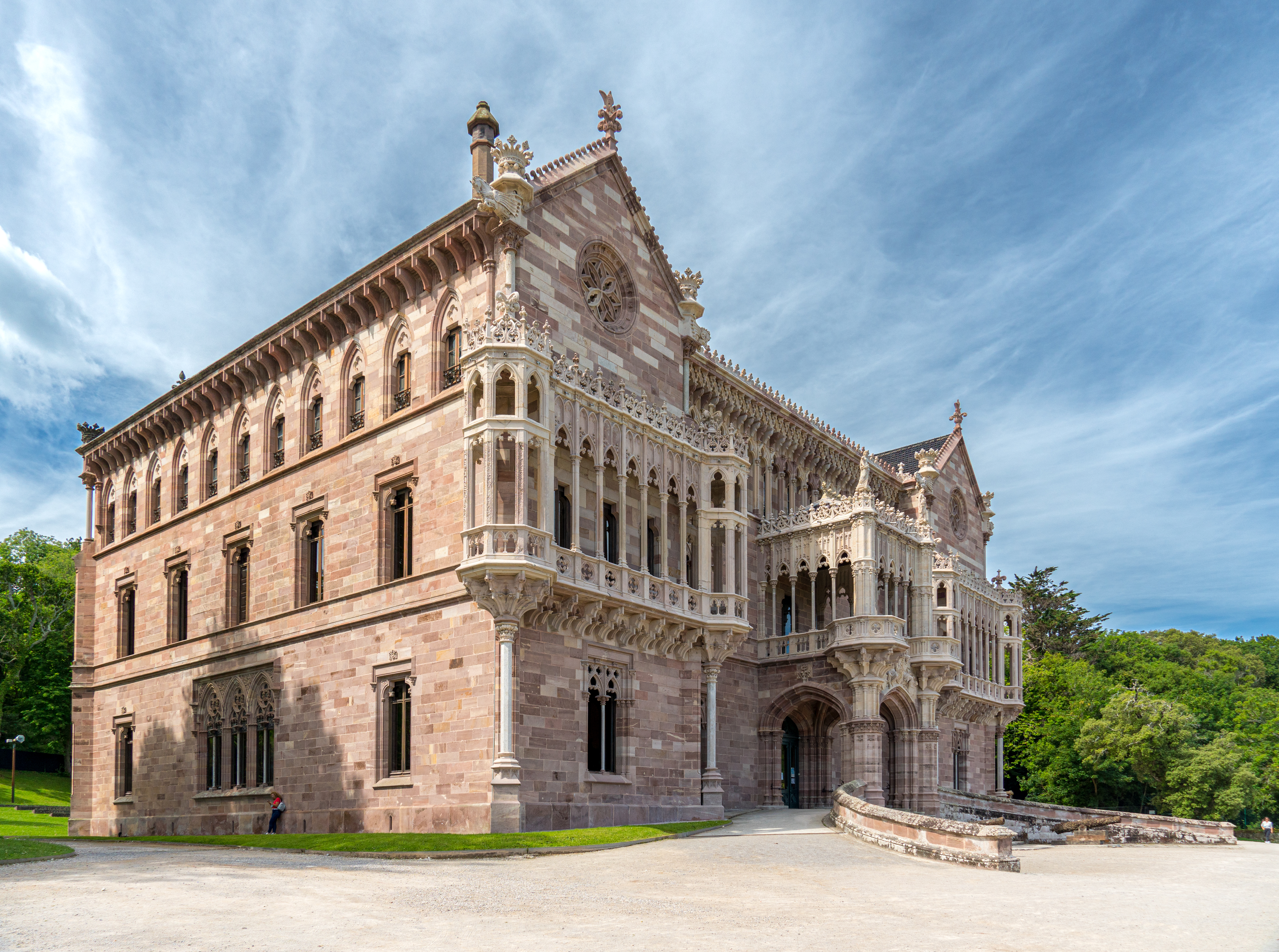
- Palacio de Sobrellano
- Interactive map of the Palacio de Sobrellano area

General information
- Type: Palace
- Architectural style: Neo-Gothic
- Location: Spain Comillas, Cantabria, Spain
- Coordinates: 43.3835°N 4.2943°W

Design and construction
- Architect: Joan Martorell
- Designations: Bien de Interés Cultural (2002)

The Palacio de Sobrellano, also known as the Palace of the Marquess of Comillas, is a Neo-Gothic palace located in the town of Comillas, Cantabria, Spain. It was designed by Catalan architect Joan Martorell and built between 1881 and 1888 on the commission of Antonio López y López, the first Marquess of Comillas, one of the wealthiest men in 19th-century Spain. In 2002 both the palace and its adjacent chapel-pantheon were declared a Bien de Interés Cultural (Asset of Cultural Interest) with the category of Monument.

The palace is notable for containing furniture designed by Antoni Gaudí and for being the first building in Spain to use electric lighting, installed at the request of the first Marquess for one of the royal visits of King Alfonso XII. Today the palace is owned by the Government of Cantabria and is open to the public through guided tours.

== History ==
Antonio Lopez y Lopez was born into a humble fishing family in Comillas and emigrated to Cuba at the age of 14, where he amassed a vast fortune. After returning to Spain and being named first Marquess of Comillas, he sought to adapt his properties to his new social position and to attract King Alfonso XII to make Comillas a royal summer destination.

Construction began in 1881 under the site direction of Cristóbal Cascante and was completed in 1888, several years after the death of the first Marquess in 1883, who never saw the palace finished. The palace was the first building in Spain to be fitted with electric lighting, installed for a planned visit by Alfonso XII, though the king ended up staying in the nearby Casa Ocejo as the installation was not completed in time.

The palace formed part of a remarkable concentration of Catalan Modernista architecture in Comillas, alongside El Capricho by Antoni Gaudi, the Pontifical University of Comillas, and the cemetery featuring Josep Llimona's sculpture The Exterminating Angel.

== Architecture ==
The building has a rectangular floor plan in the Neo-Gothic style, blending elements of English Perpendicular Gothic with Venetian Renaissance and Moorish decorative influences. The facade is built in stone from Carrejo, featuring open galleries decorated with trefoil arcades and colonnades. The columns are crowned with finials in the shape of fleurs-de-lis, crowns and winged horses, sculpted by Joan Roig.

The interior features flooring made from American oak and ebony, and doors of walnut. A monumental white marble staircase with a double flight is lit by a polychrome stained glass skylight. The palace contains furniture designed by Antoni Gaudi and murals painted by Eduardo Llorens.

The most lavishly decorated space is the central throne room, featuring a coffered ceiling and walls covered in gold leaf. The stained glass windows were made in the workshops of Eudald Amigo. The eight mural paintings by Eduardo Llorens depict the most significant events of the marquisate: the inauguration of the Comillas Seminary in 1887, the blessing of the Chapel-Pantheon in 1881, the grand Naval Review held in the Port of Comillas during the royal visit of 1881, and the embarkation of Catalan volunteers in Barcelona aboard the steamship Espana, donated by Lopez y Lopez's shipping company to support the king in the Ten Years War.

== Chapel-Pantheon ==
Adjacent to the palace stands the Chapel-Pantheon, also designed by Joan Martorell and completed in 1881. Despite its small size, its appearance evokes a cathedral, complete with gargoyles and an ambulatory. It contains furniture by Antoni Gaudi and sculptures by Joan Roig, Josep Llimona, Venancio Vallmitjana and Agapito Vallmitjana.

== In film ==
The palace has served as a filming location for several Spanish productions:

- La residencia (1969)
- Vera, un cuento cruel (1973)
- Sexykiller (2008)
- La herencia Valdemar (2009)
- Fuga de cerebros 2 (2011)
- Altamira (2016)
- Galgos (TV series, 2024)

== Gallery ==
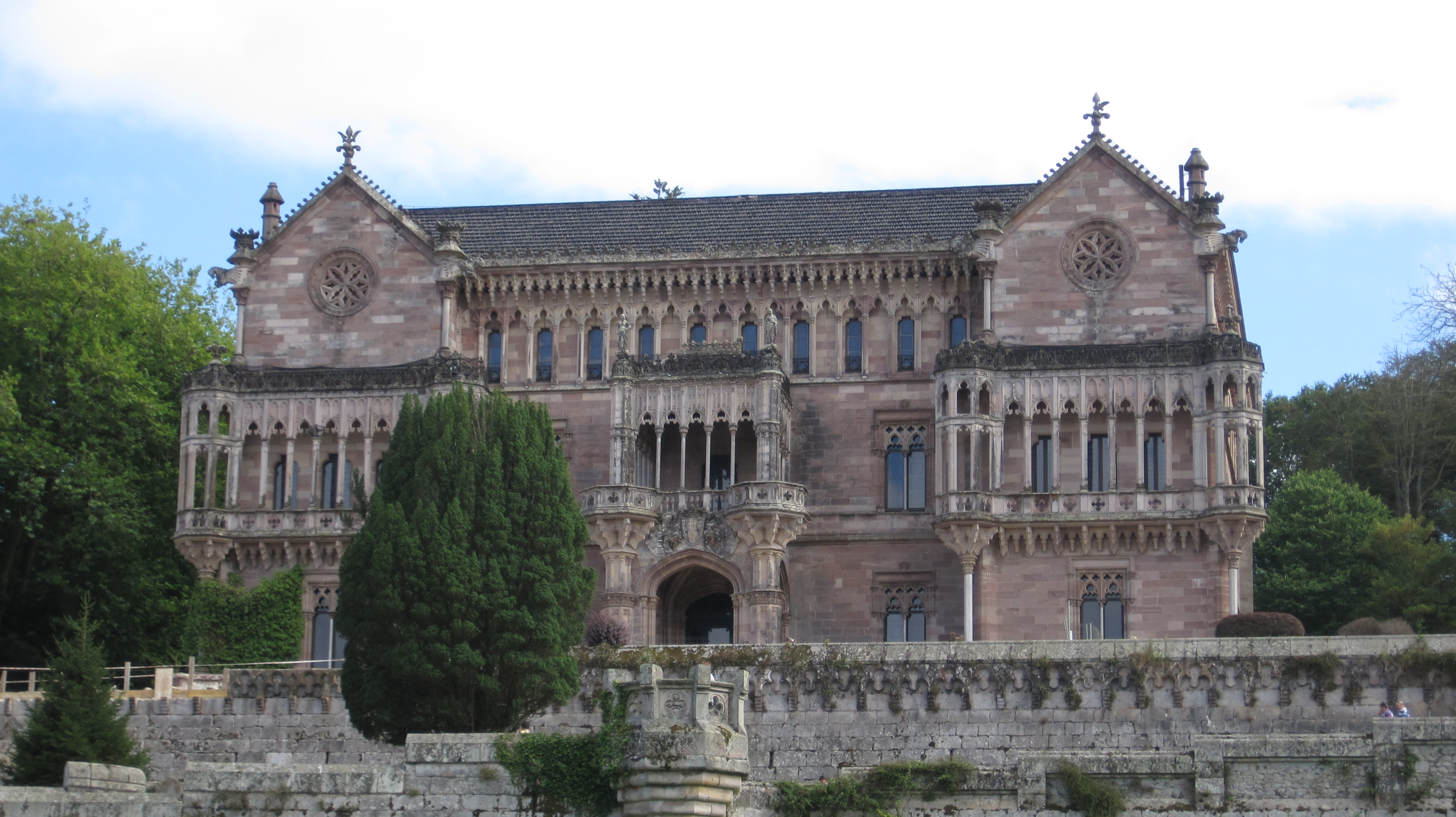
Main facade

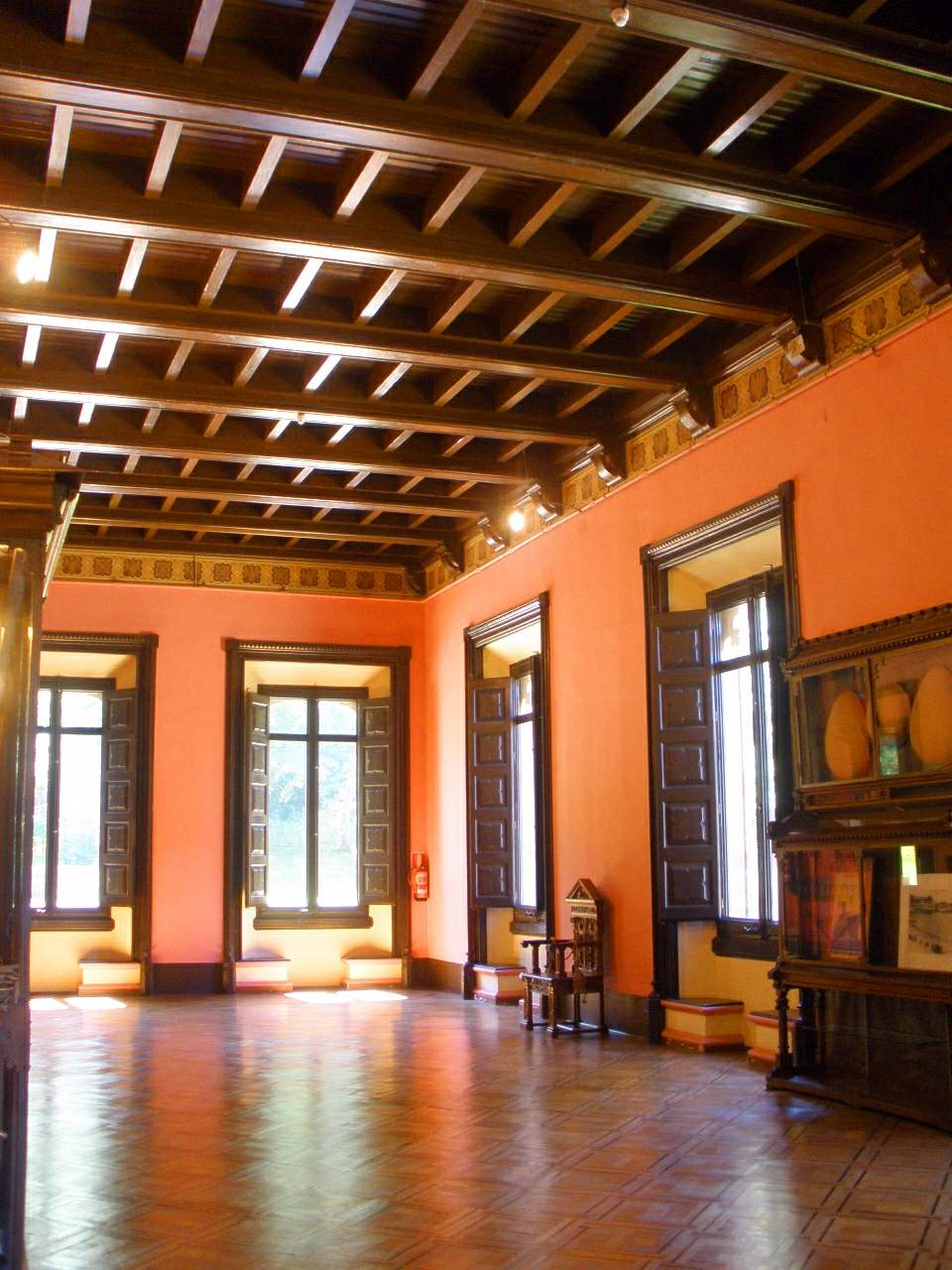
Interior room

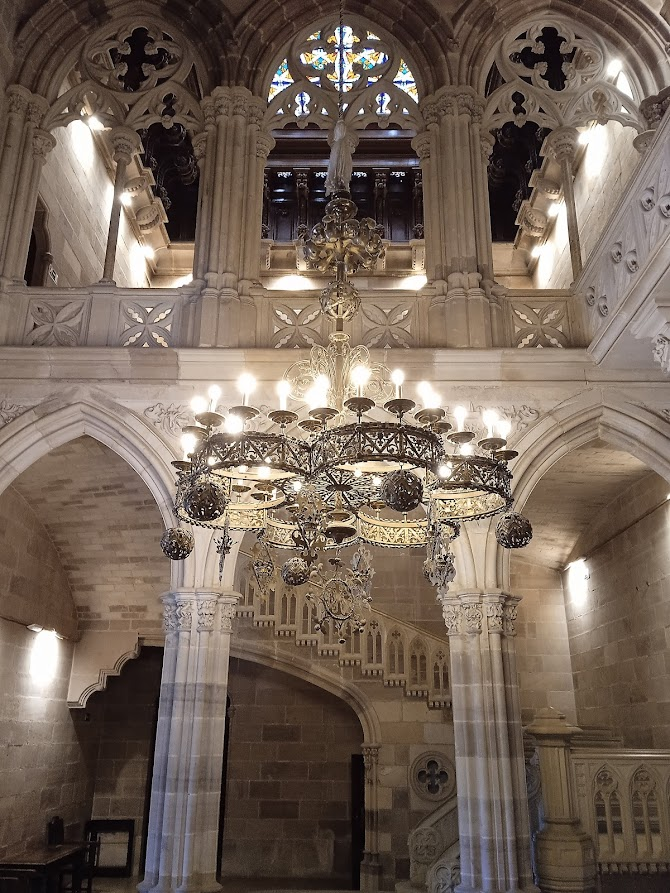
Staircase

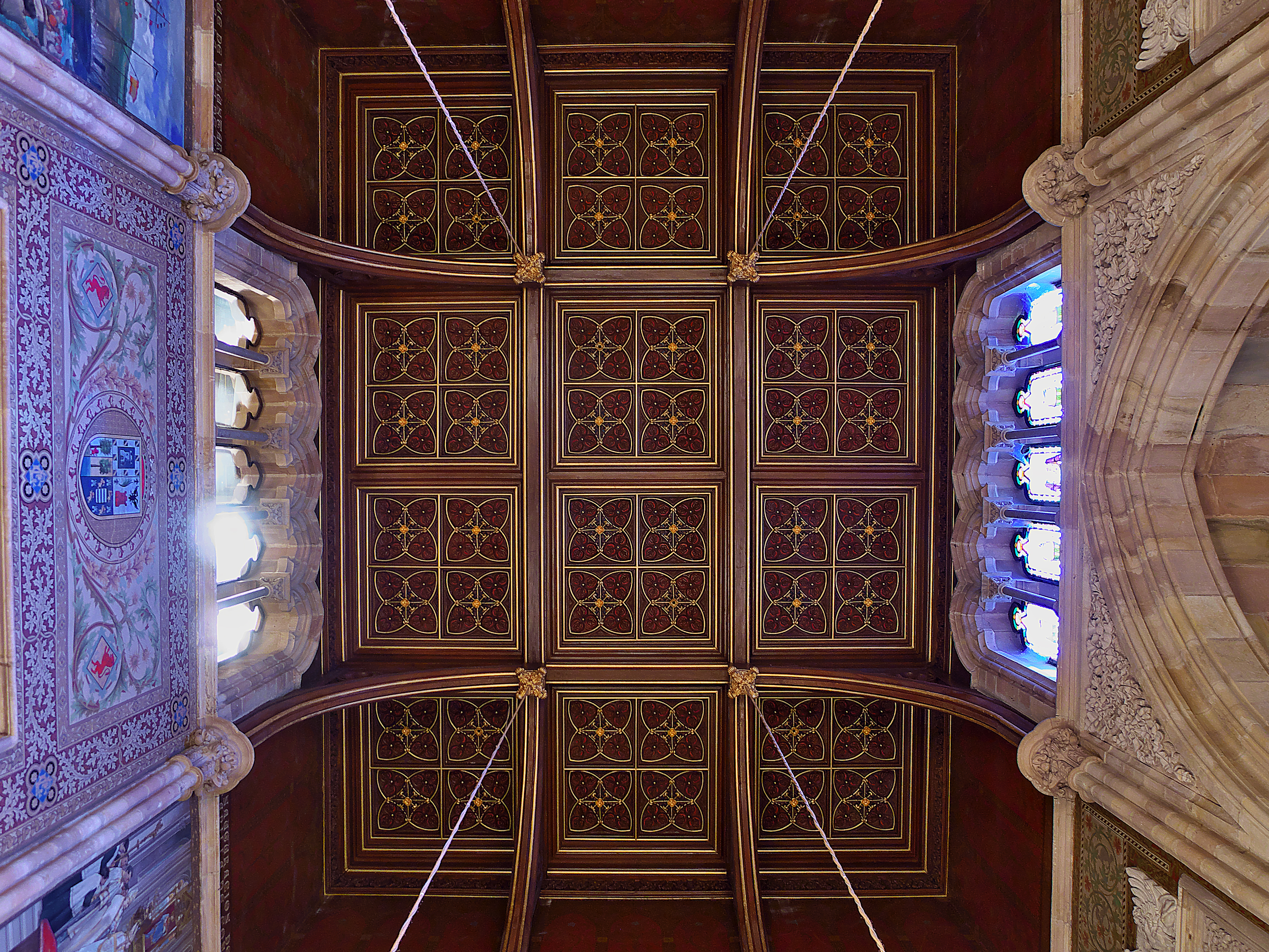
Coffered ceiling of the throne room
