= Comillas =

- Municipality
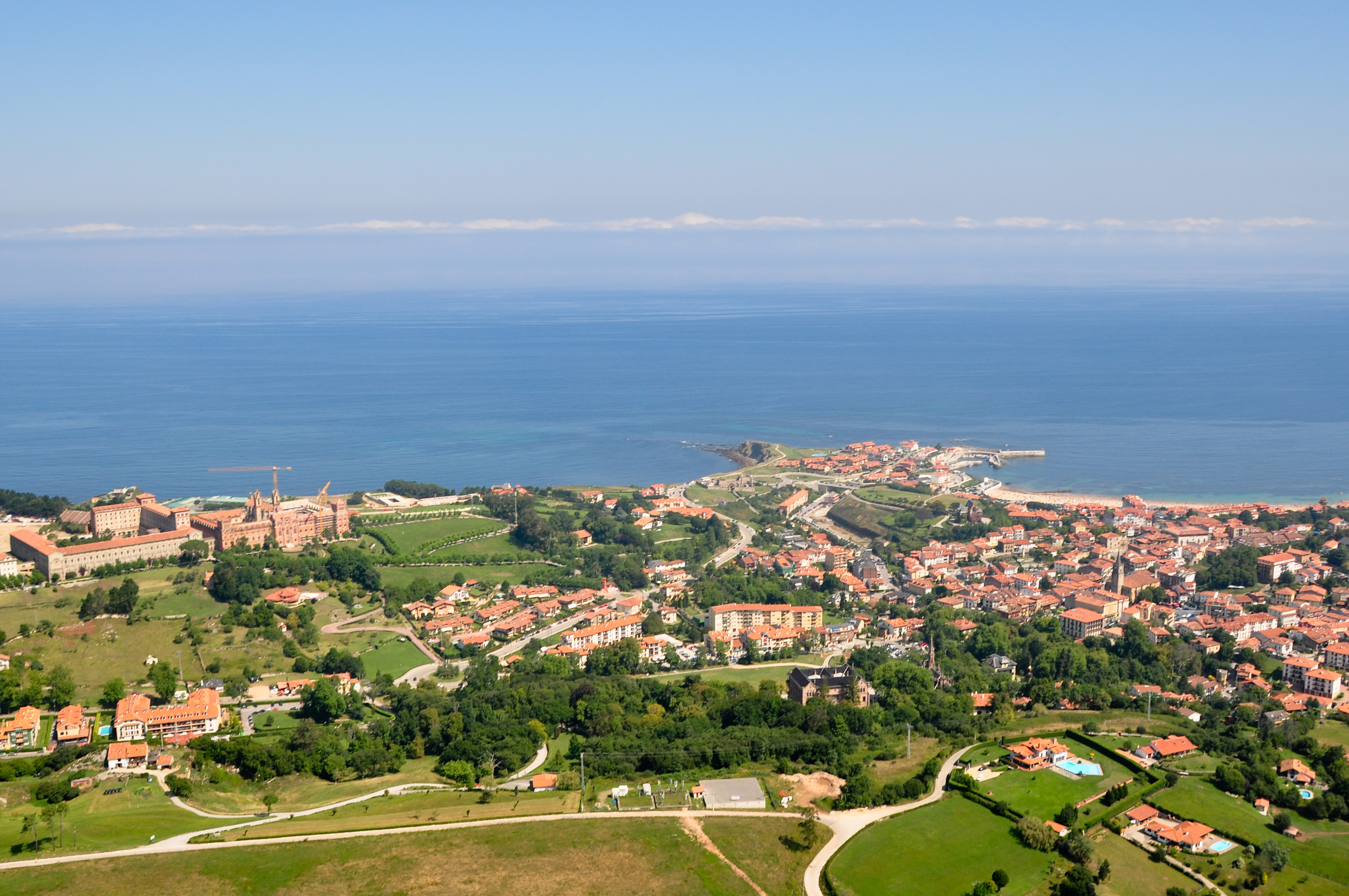
- Aerial view of Comillas

- Flag Coat of arms

- Location in Cantabria

- Location in Spain
- Coordinates: 43°23′13″N 4°17′22″W
- Country: Spain
- Autonomous community: Cantabria
- Province: Cantabria
- Comarca: Western coast of Cantabria
- Judicial district: San Vicente de la Barquera
- Capital: Comillas

Government
  - Alcaldesa: María Teresa Noceda Llano (2007) (PRC)

Area
  - Total: 18.61 km^{2} (7.19 sq mi)
- Elevation: 23 m (75 ft)
- Highest elevation: 210 m (690 ft)
- Lowest elevation: 0 m (0 ft)

Population (2025-01-01)
  - Total: 2,075
  - Density: 111.5/km^{2} (288.8/sq mi)
- Demonym(s): Comillano, na
- Time zone: UTC+1 (CET)
  - Summer (DST): UTC+2 (CEST)
- Website: Official website

Comillas is a small township and municipality in the northern reaches of Spain, in the autonomous community of Cantabria. The Marquessate of Comillas, a fiefdom of Spanish nobility, holds ceremonial office in the seat of power at a small castle which overlooks the town. The Comillas Pontifical University was housed here before it moved to Madrid, and the old university buildings are among the finest examples of architecture in the town. Besides this, there are many notable medieval and baroque buildings.

From the second half of the 19th century, the Spanish royal family started spending their summers in Comillas, and so did a large part of the Spanish nobility, whose many descendants still frequent the town every summer. As a result, Comillas left an imprint of architectural relics such as palaces and monuments designed by renowned Catalan artists in particular, i.e. Gaudí or Doménech i Montaner. From the second half of the 20th century however, southern Spain and the islands became more popular due to an increasing inclination towards sunnier destinations, and so places like Marbella, Sotogrande or Mallorca became attractive prospects for the rich and famous. Although the town has seen an upsurge in the last years, it still maintains its character as "the haven for the decadent and discreet aristocracy".

Comillas was the capital of Spain for one day, on 6 August 1881, following an agreement between king Alfonso XII and the Minister's Council to gather at a formal meeting in town. It also became the first place in Spain to use Edison's electric light bulbs, in 1880.

== History ==
Comillas was first inhabited in prehistoric times when the caverns that are plentiful in the area were used as shelters. The Neolithic inhabitants left behind them rock paintings that depicted the animals they hunted. Magdalenian and Bronze Age artefacts have been found in nearby Ruiseñada, and there was an ancient mine at La Molina in which utensils and Roman coins have been found as well as an altar dedicated to the god Jupiter. Arrowheads have also been found here. On the border between Comillas and Ruiloba, heaps of shells have been found showing that the ancient people, besides hunting, specialised in collecting food from the sea.

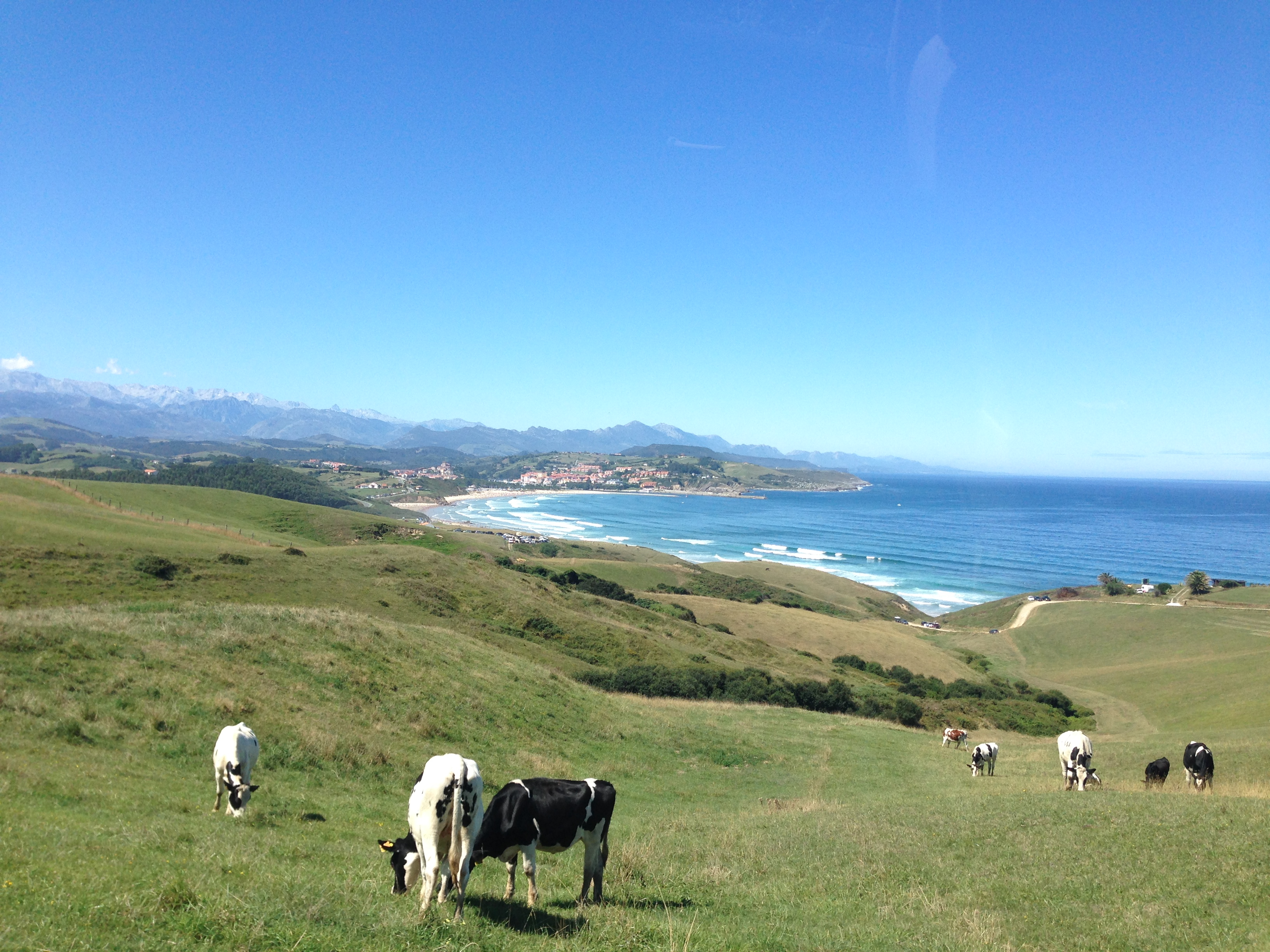
View of Oyambre Beach with Picos de Europa behind

The remains of the medieval castle of Peña del Castillo are still visible and another castle later occupied the same strategic site. The earliest documents relating to the town date to the eleventh century, although most of them were destroyed later in a fire at the town hall. Garcilaso de la Vega built a tower on the coast to demonstrate the town's dominance in maritime affairs. After the conclusion of the Valles Lawsuit against the Duke of Infantado in 1581, Comillas became part of the Province of Nine Valleys, a judicial and administrative body. Historically, the town was one of four towns making up the Alfoz of Lloredo. The town is sometimes known as the "Town of the Bishops", because five priests who were born here went on to become bishops in several different dioceses during the Middle Ages.

During the second half of the 19th century, the first Marquess Antonio López y López invited King Alfonso XII to his mansion at Comillas and the town became popular with the aristocracy; the architect Joan Martorell built the enormous Palacio de Sobrellano on the instructions of the marquess.

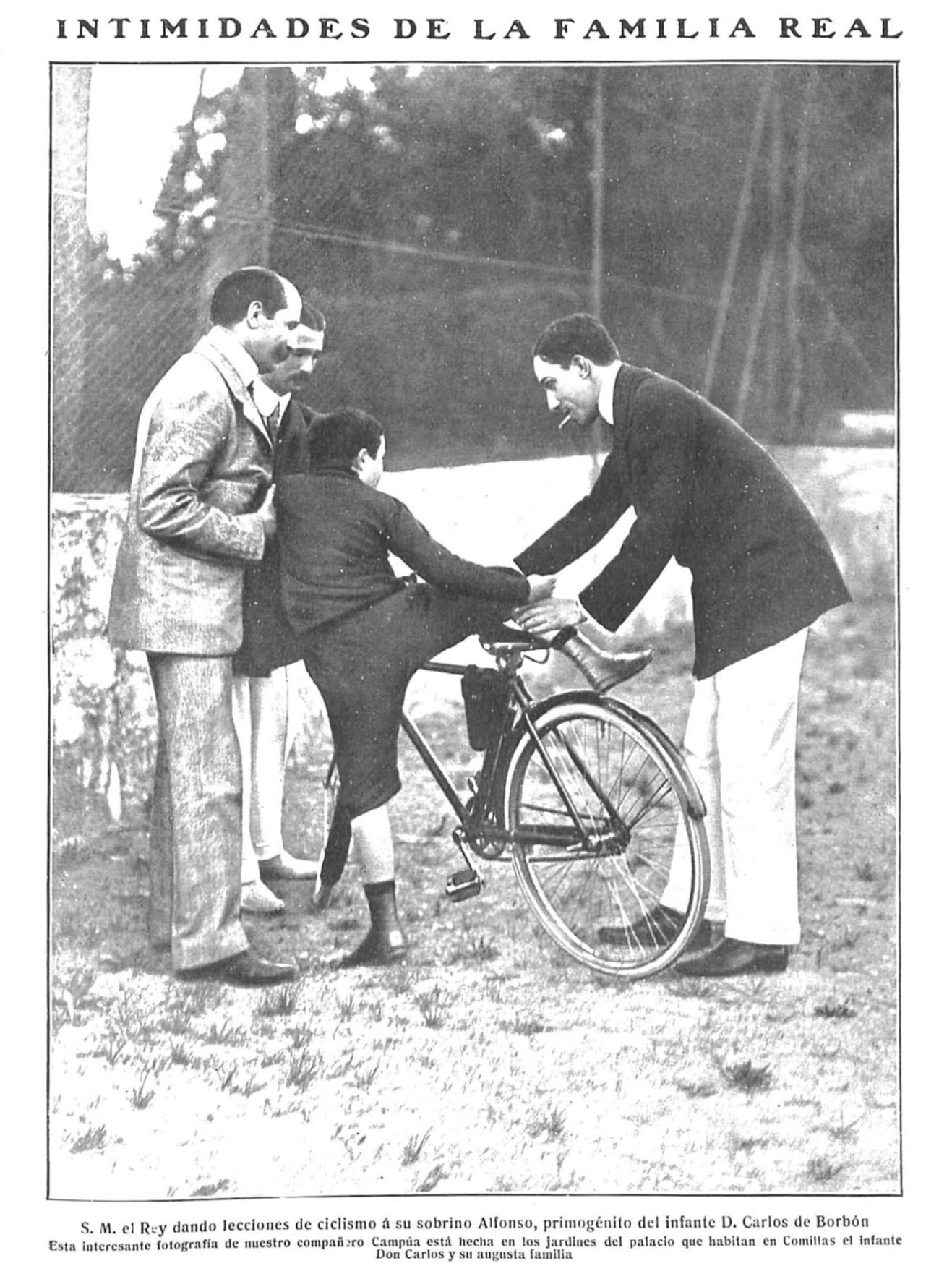
Alfonso XIII (right) teaching cycling to his nephew Infante Alfonso in Comillas, 1910

== Geography ==
Comillas is situated close to the coast in the autonomous community of Cantabria. To the north lies the Bay of Biscay and to the south the Cantabrian Mountains which run parallel with the coast, the highest point of which is the Torre de Cerredo, 2,648 metres (8,688 ft). Santander lies fifty kilometres to the east. There is a sandy beach and headlands and the town is set a little way back from the sea.

== Buildings ==
The Plaza del Corro de Campios, in the centre of the oldest part of the town, is surrounded by ancestral mansions with shields on the walls depicting the noble families who lived there. The town hall and the seventeenth century parish church of San Cristóbal are nearby, and there are some interesting mausoleums in the cemetery. The Neo-Gothic university buildings overlook the town. The Art Nouveau buildings are some of the finest in Cantabria and include the Sobrellano Palace Chapel, the Pantheon, and El Capricho, a fantastic creation by the Catalan architect Antoni Gaudí.

== Marquess of Comillas ==
The first Marquess of Comillas was Antonio López y López (died 1883). Founder and owner of the Compañía Transatlántica Española, he was born in Comillas in 1817 and made his money in Cuba in shipping and slaves. He bought the title in 1878. The second Marquess of Comillas was his son Claudio López Bru. The current Marquess of Comillas is Don Juan Alfonso Güell y Martos.

== Gallery ==
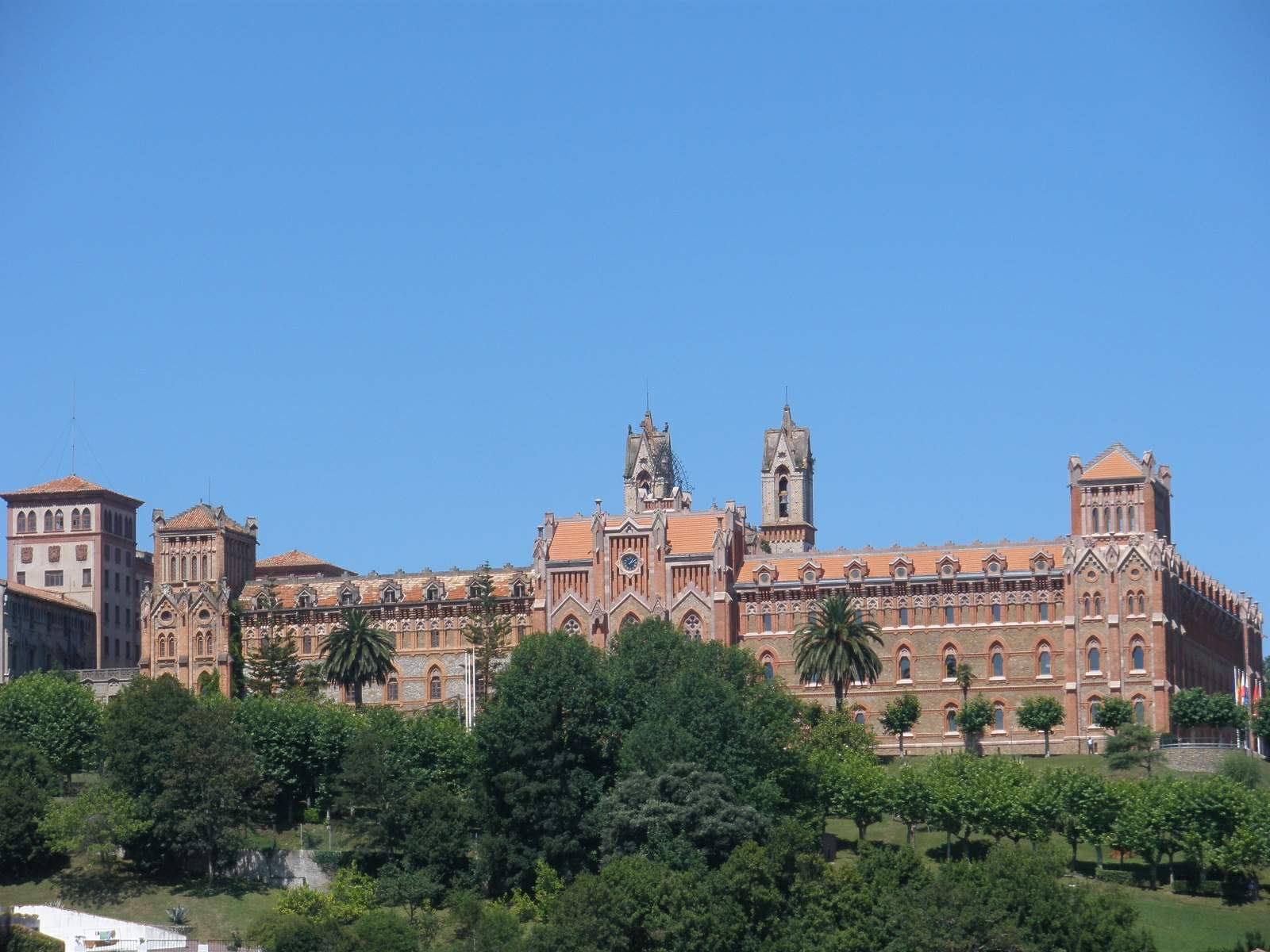
Original complex of the Pontifical University of Comillas

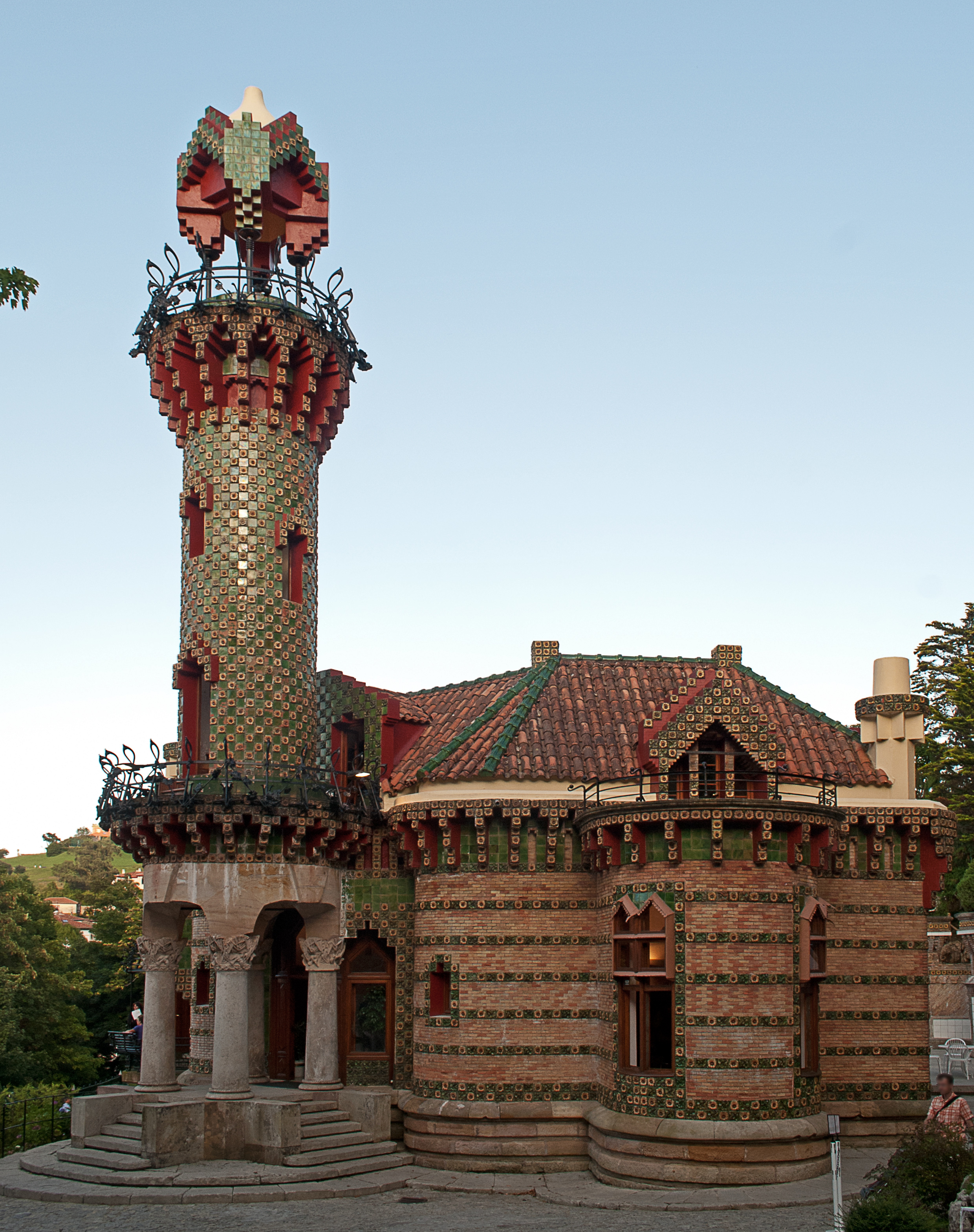
El Capricho, a building by Antoni Gaudí

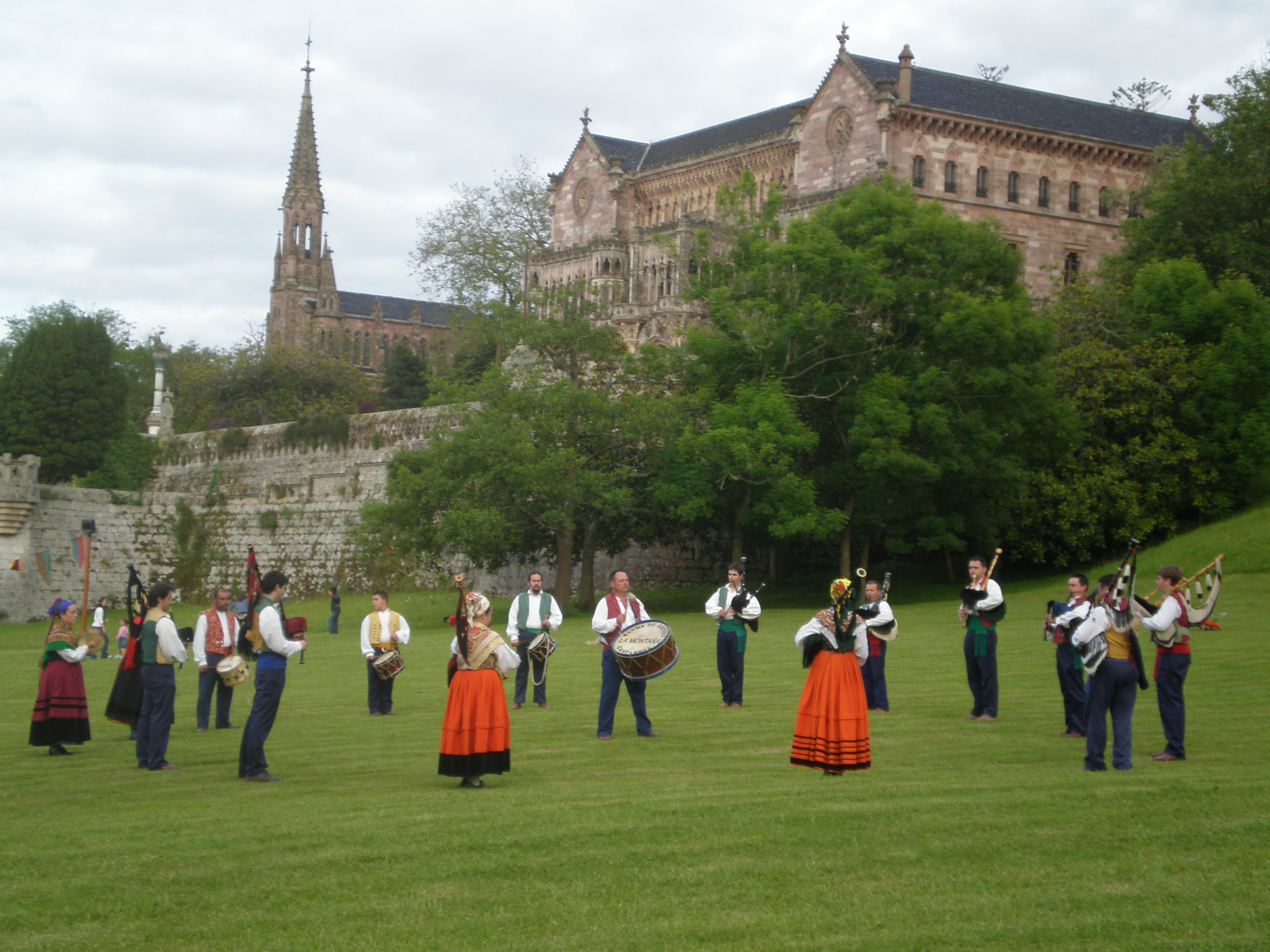
Band of pipers playing in front of the palace of Sobrellano

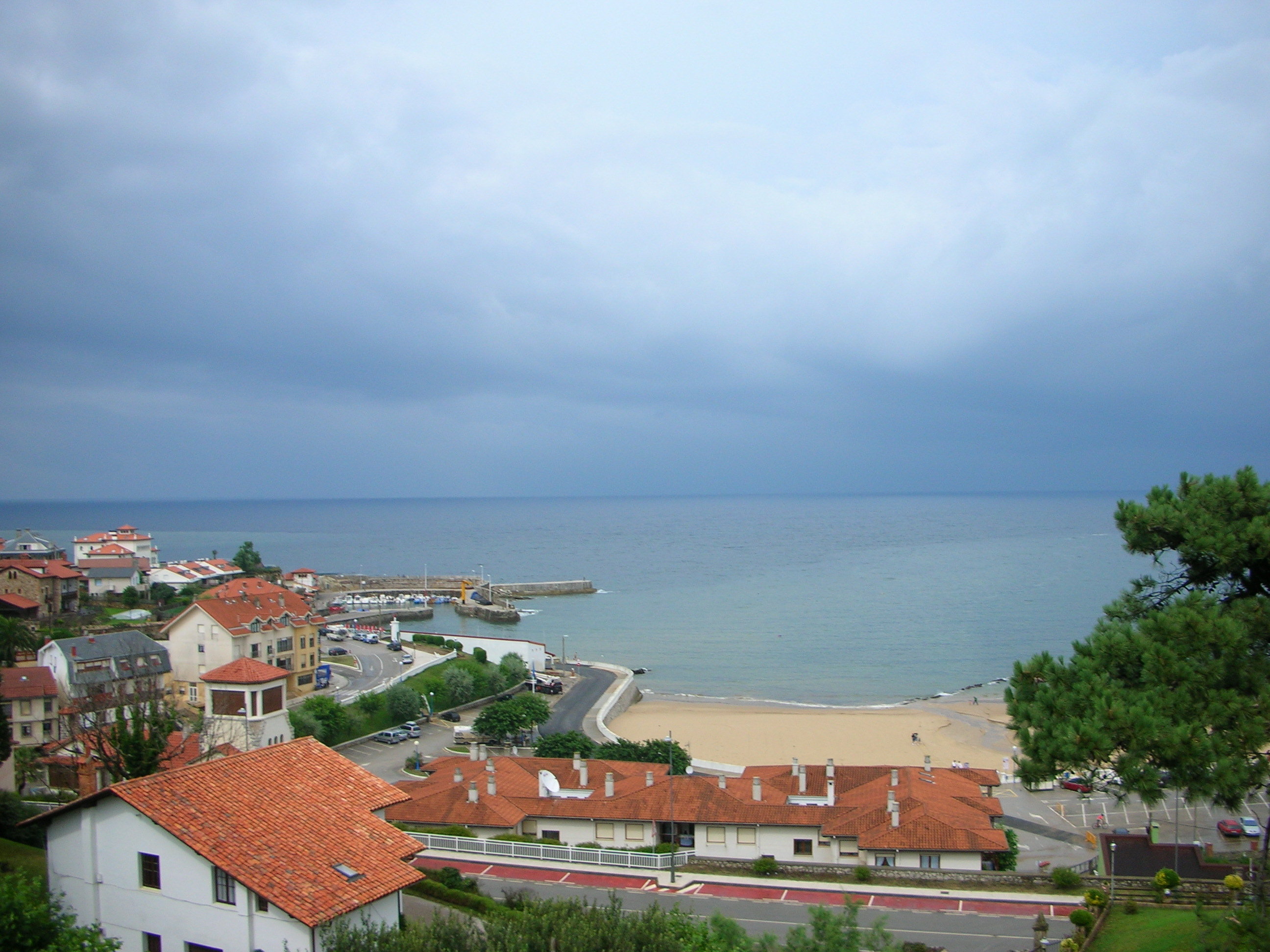
Beach and port

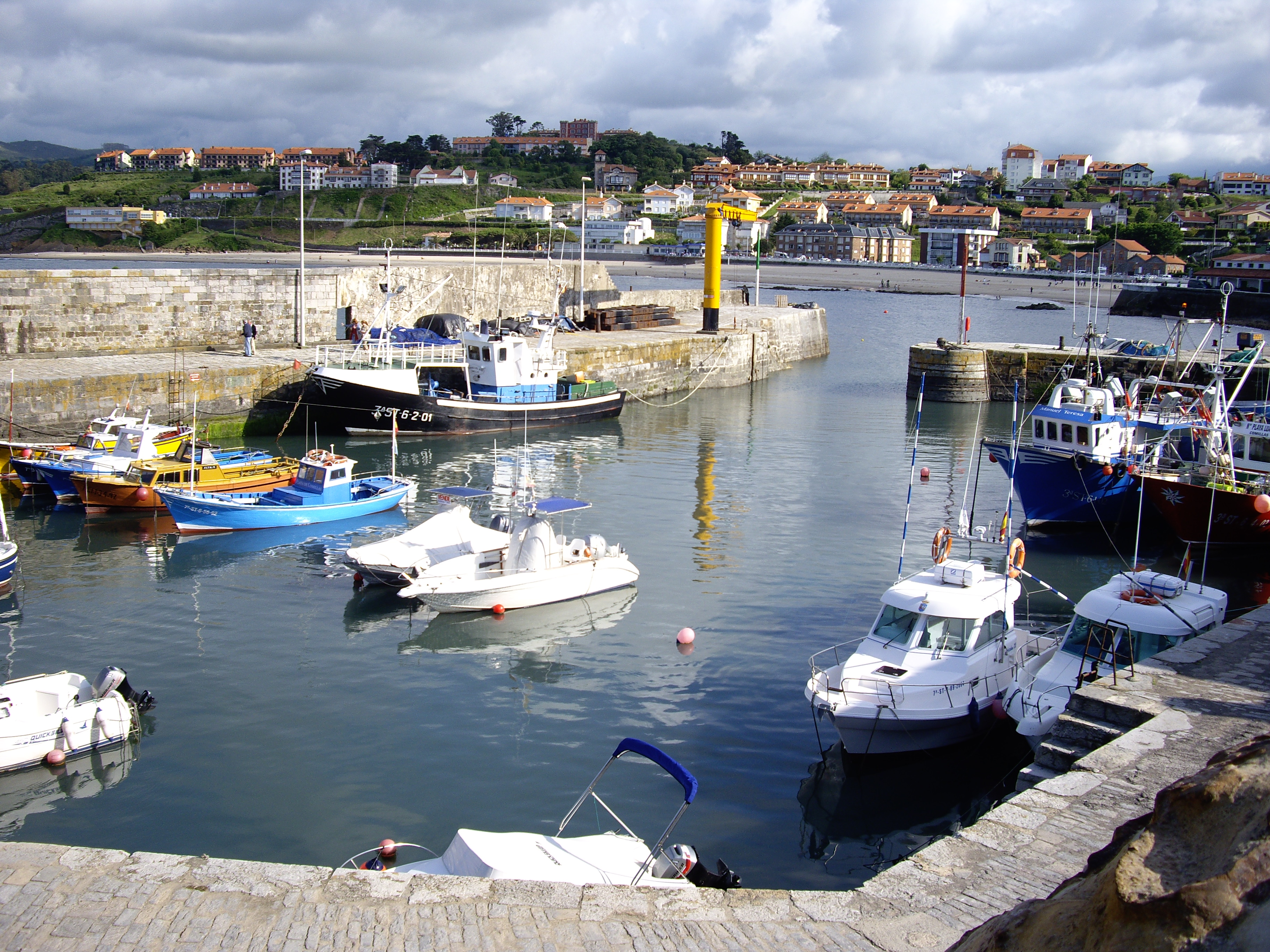
Harbour

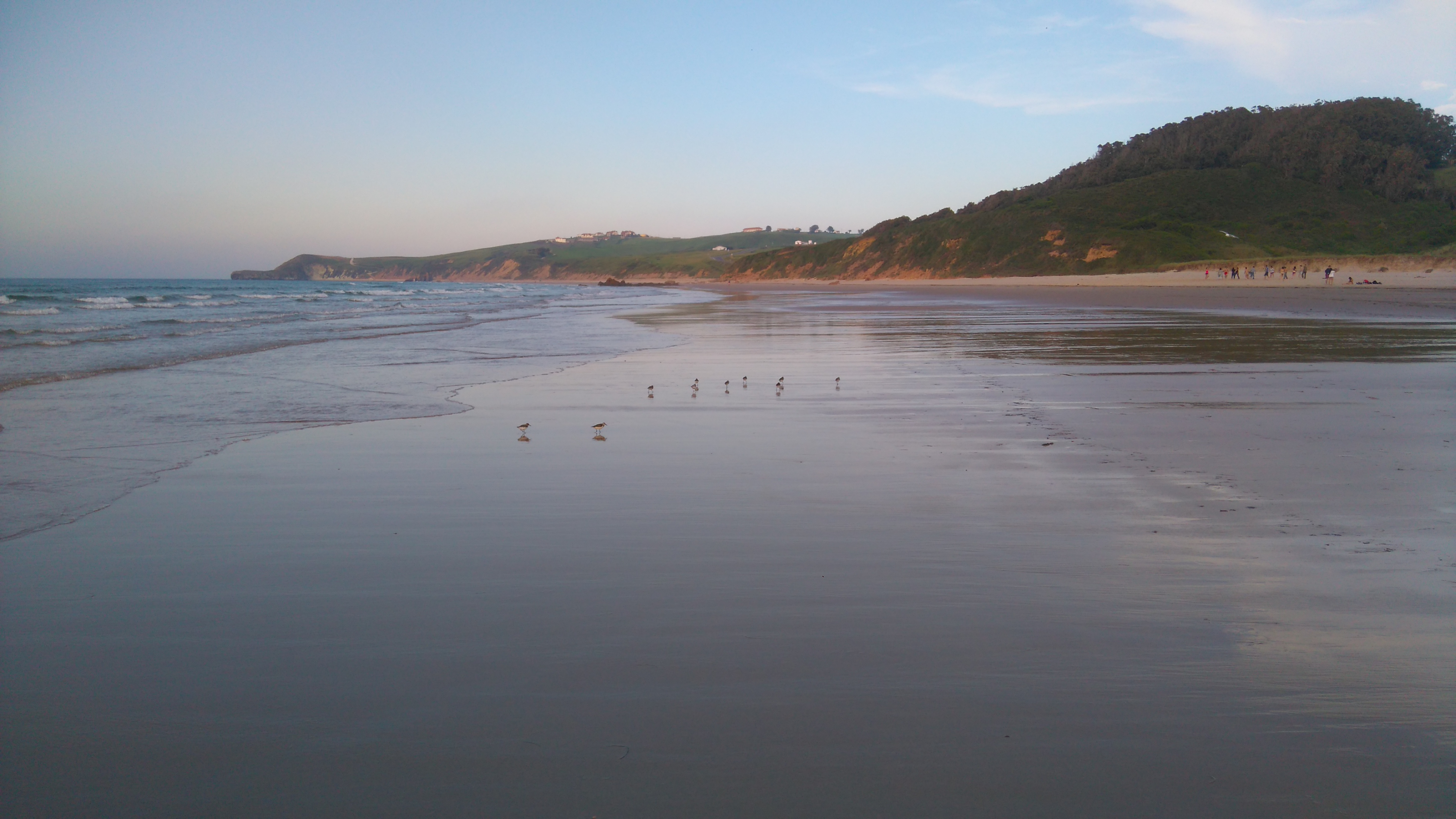
Playa de Oyambre

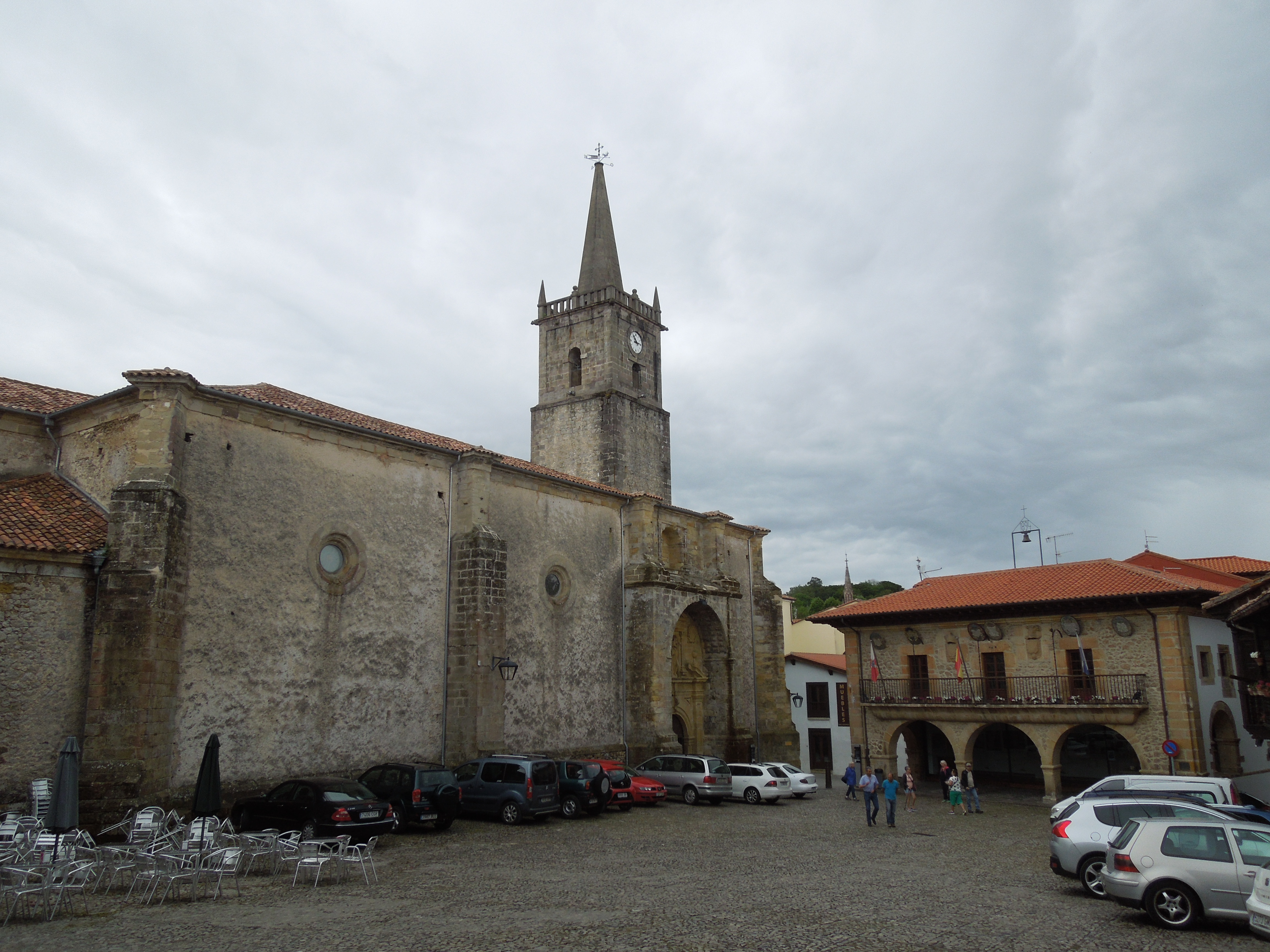
Church of San Cristóbal

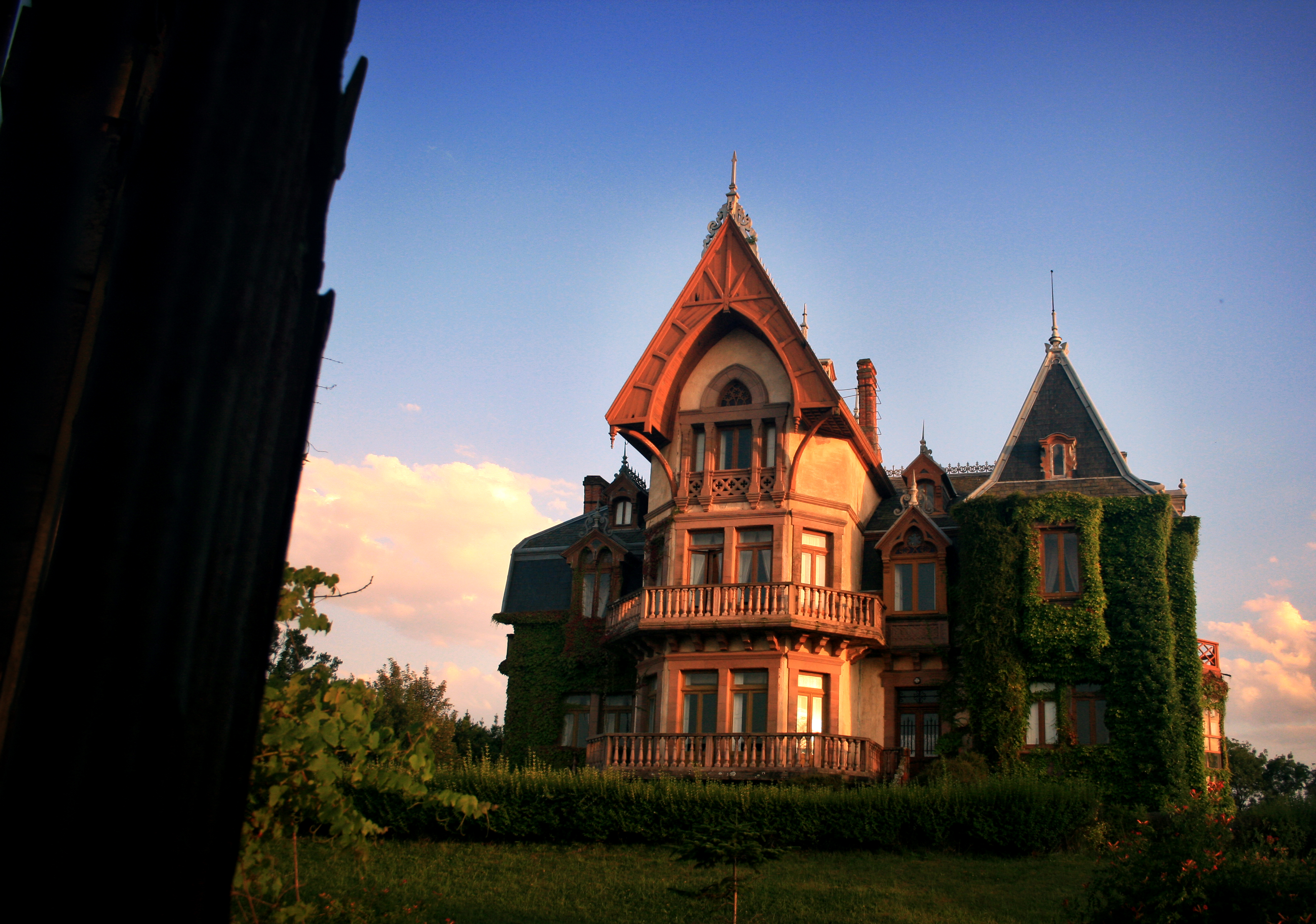
Palace of the Dukes of Almodóvar del Río

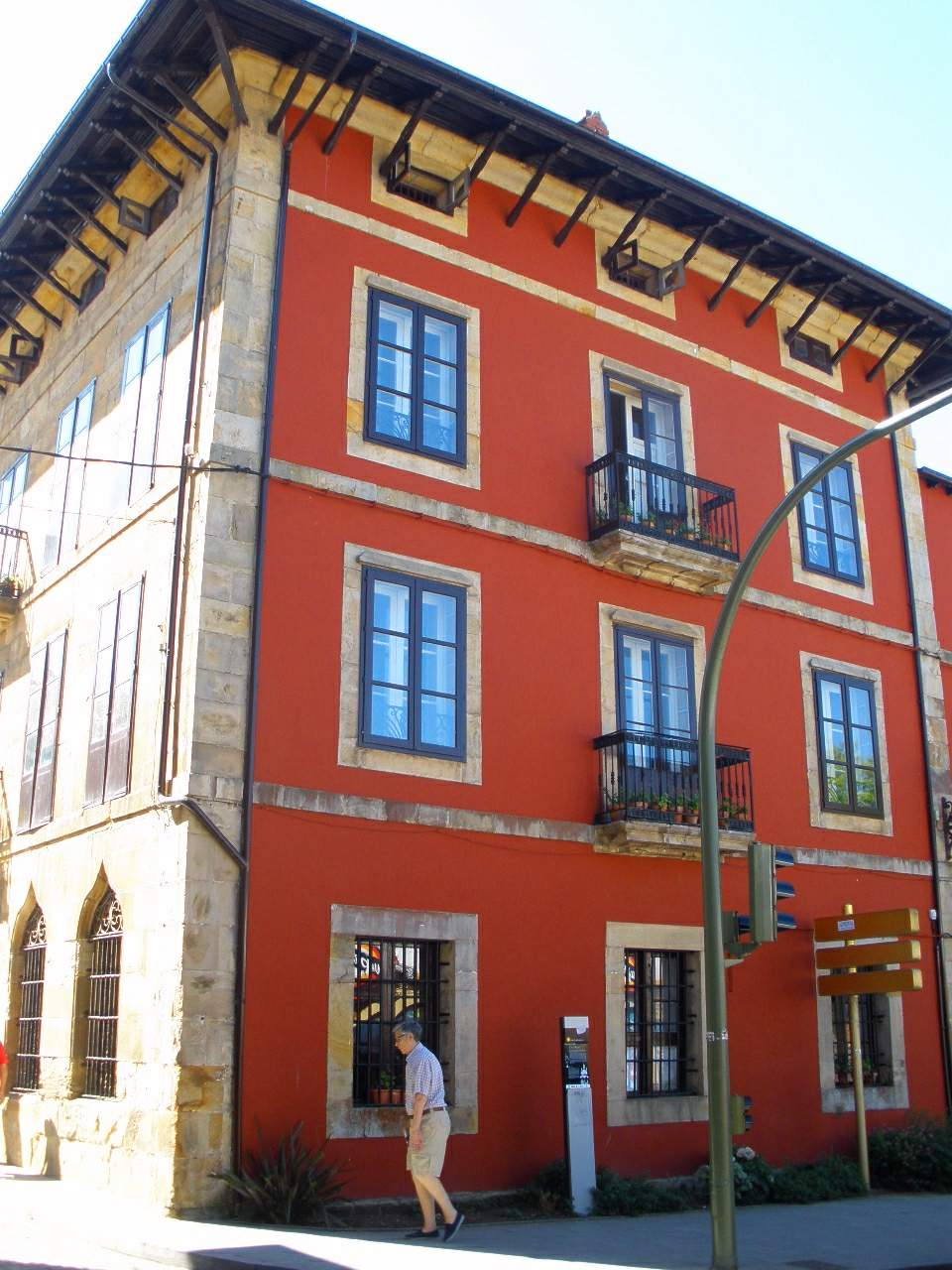
Casa Ocejo, current seat of the Count of Orgaz

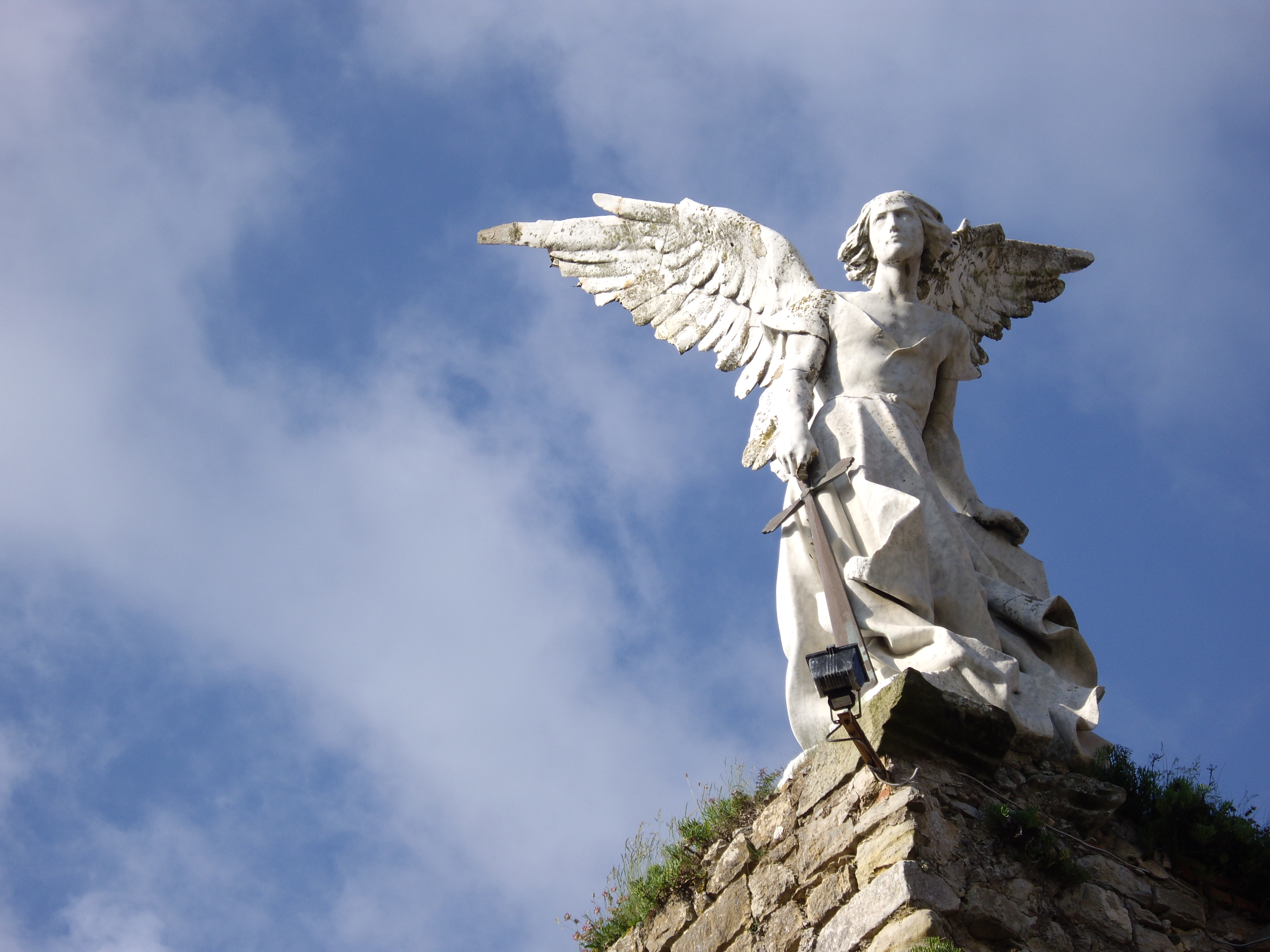
El ángel exterminador, by Josep Llimona, one of the symbols of Comillas

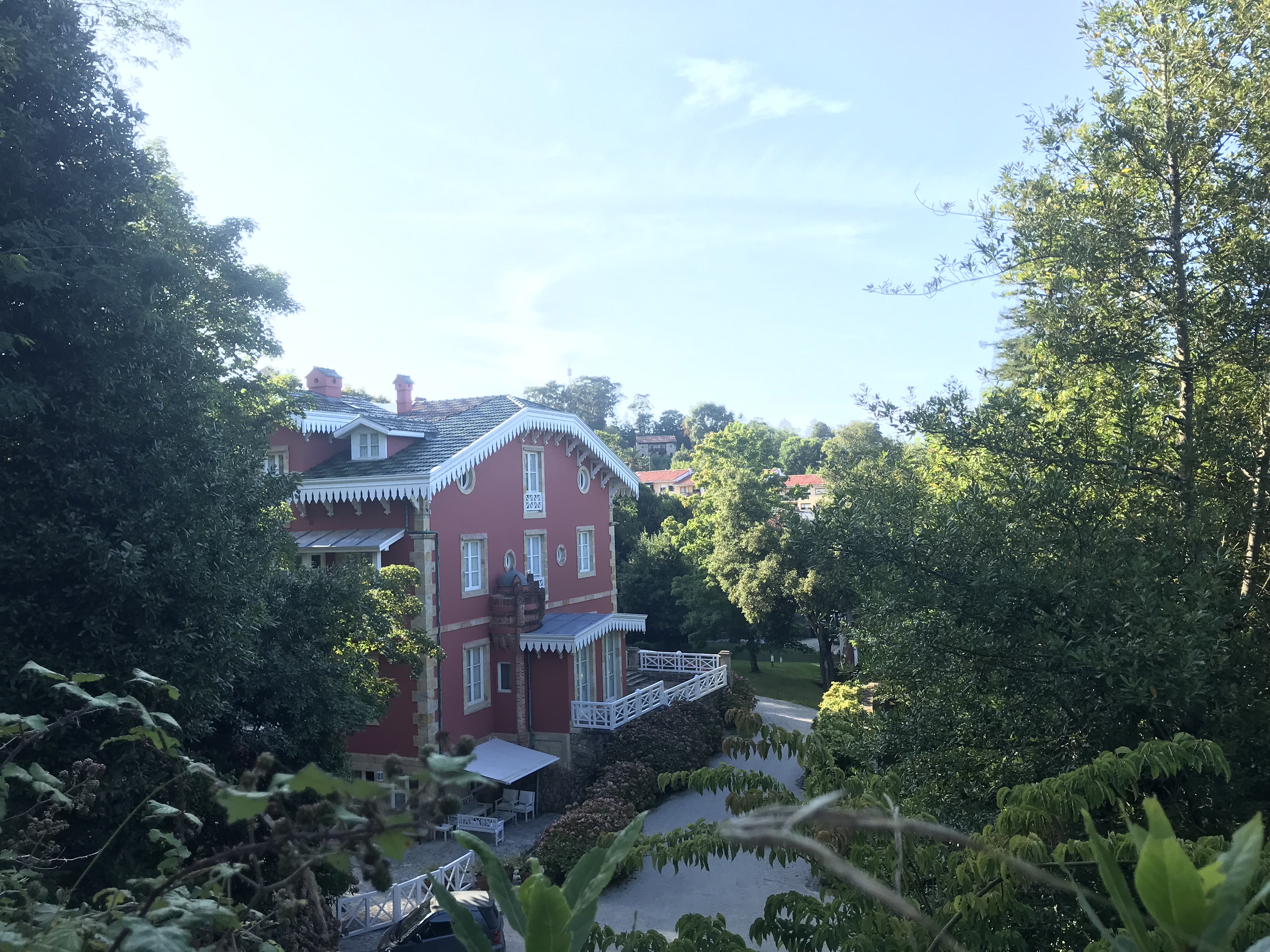
View of a typical building of Comillas

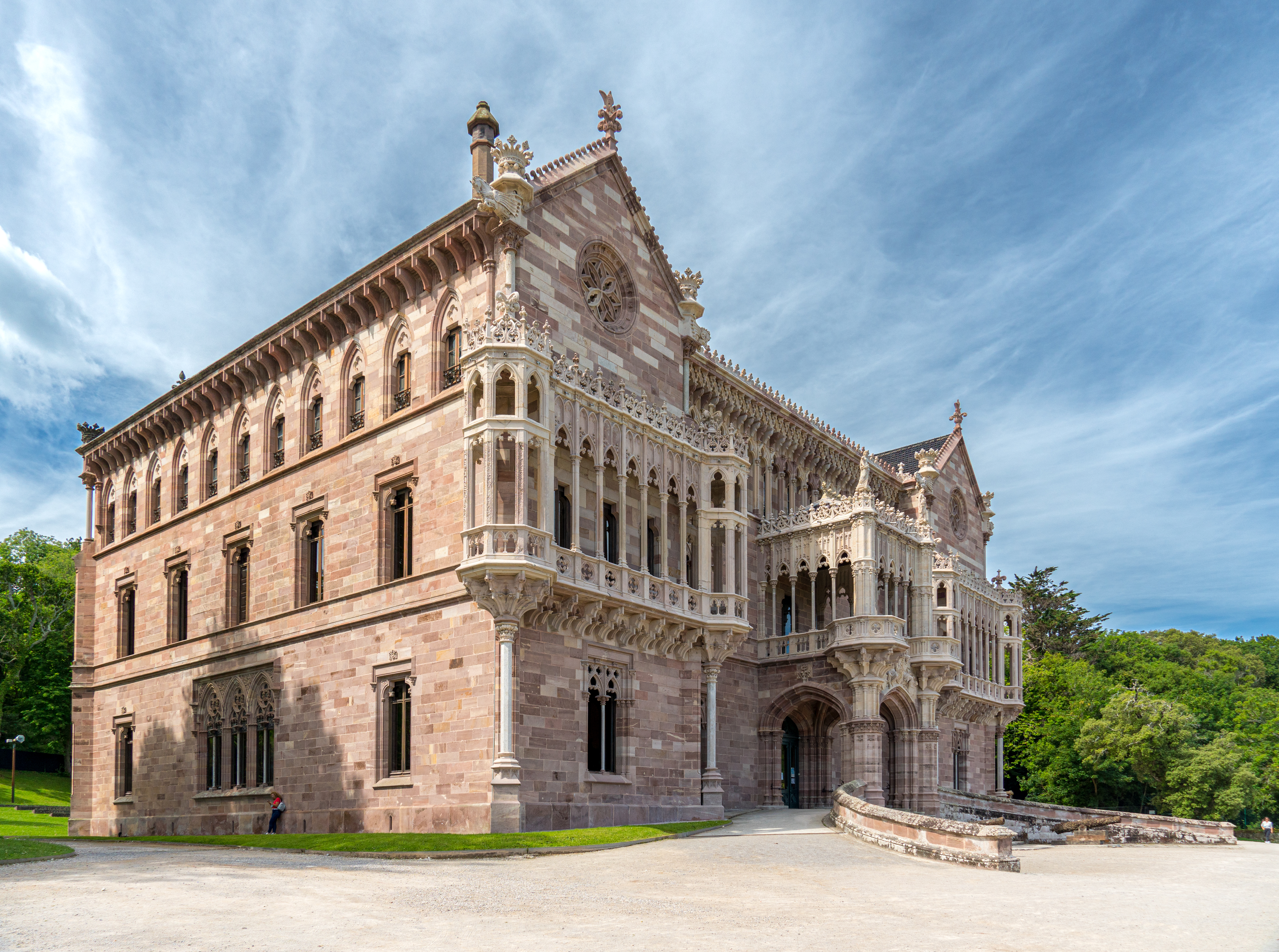
Sobrellano Palace
