= Joan Martorell =

Catalan architect (1833–1906)

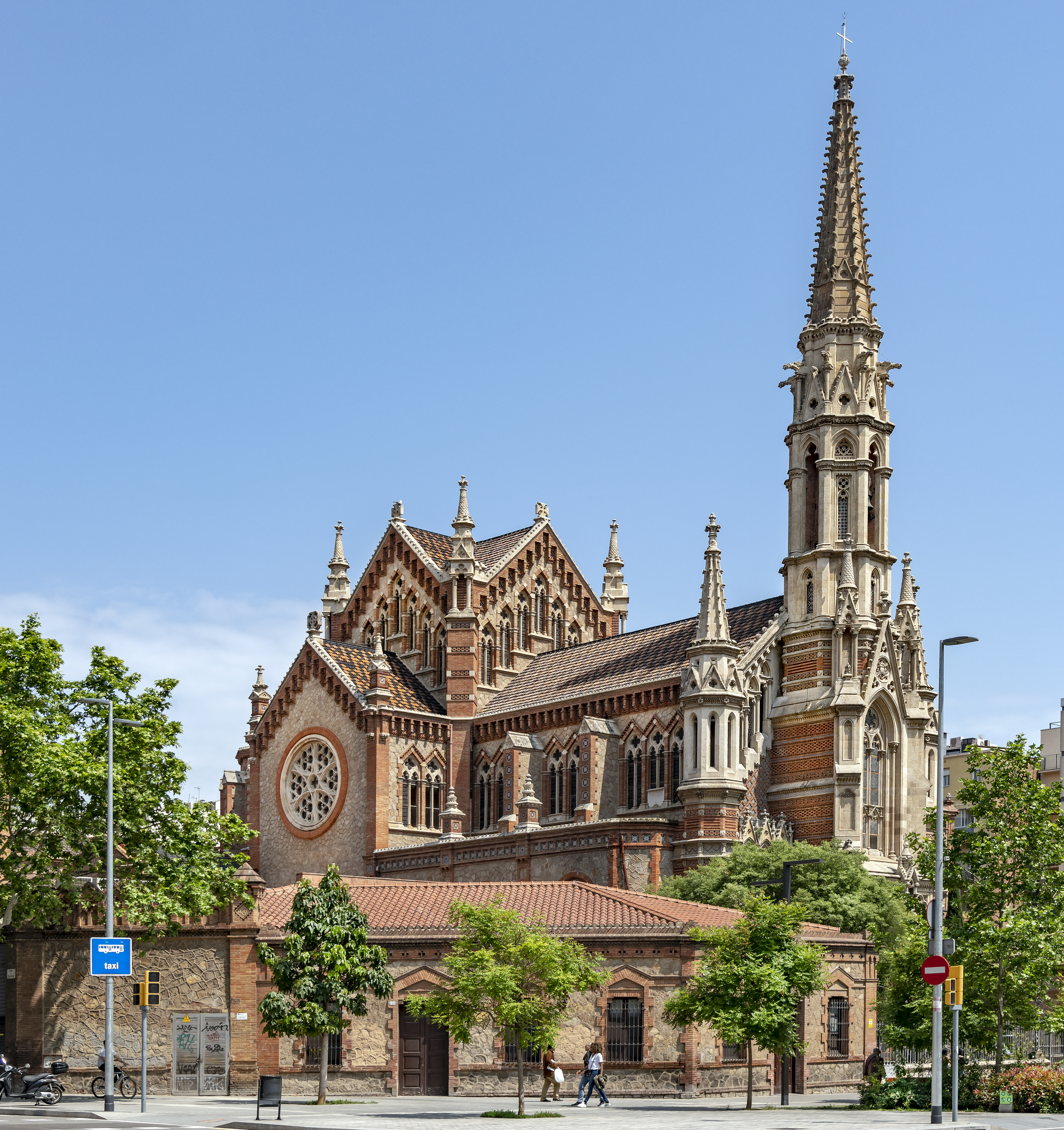
Església i Convent de les Saleses (1877–1885)

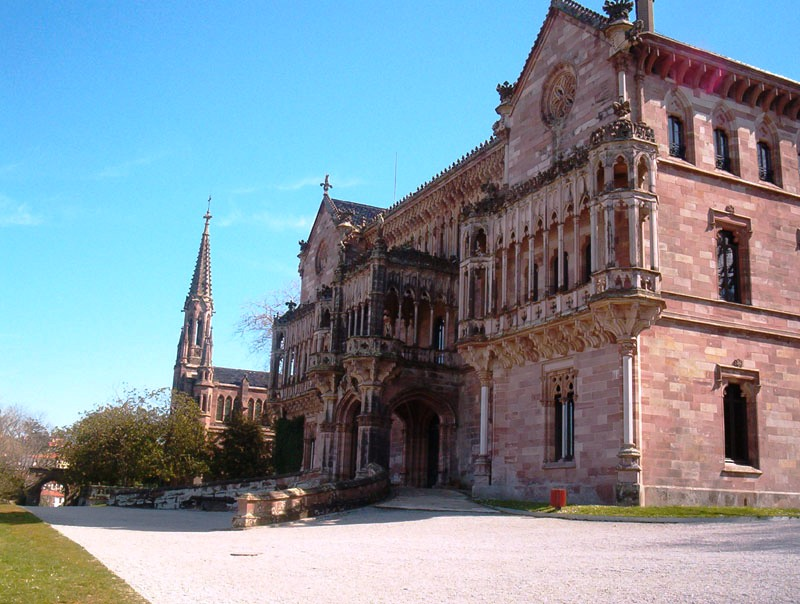
Palace and chapel, Palacio de Sobrellano, Comillas (1878–1881)

Joan Martorell i Montells (Catalan pronunciation: [ʒuˈam məɾtuˈɾeʎ]) (born 1833 in Barcelona, died 5 July 1906 in Barcelona) was a Catalan architect and designer. He was an uncle of the architect Bernardí Martorell i Puig.

Martorell worked in the styles of historicism and Gothic Revival. His Gothic style was influenced by French architect Eugène Viollet-le-Duc and English architect William Butterfield. He was known for his restoration work on Gothic churches, and worked with the Archdiocese of Barcelona on its properties. One of his most notable works is the Church of the Salesas in Barcelona, completed in 1885, which combined Gothic Revival, Romanesque Revival and the indigenous Mudéjar architectural styles. In Comillas, Spain, he designed the Palacio de Sobrellano, and the Capilla Panteón de los Marqueses de Comillas, and helped design the Universidad Pontificia with Lluís Domènech i Montaner.

Martorell is also known for his later work in the Catalan school of Modernisme, and for his relationships with his contemporary Modernisme architects, especially his protégé Antoni Gaudí. He was a professor and later an employer of Gaudí. Martorell taught Gaudí graphic statics, an important engineering technique that Gaudi frequently used to create vaulted ceilings without the use of buttresses.

He also introduced Gaudí to his most important client and patron, Eusebi Güell. Martorell also steered other commissions to Gaudí, including design work for the city of Barcelona and furniture design for the Marqués de Comillas. Martorell headed the committee that selected Antoni Gaudí to take over the design and construction of the Sagrada Familia in Barcelona in 1883 when the original architect, Francisco de Paula del Villar y Lozano, retired from the project.

== Works ==
Most of Martorell's works were built in Barcelona. Some of the most important works include:

- Església i Convent de les Adoratrius (1874)
- Església i Convent de les Saleses (1877–1885)
- Reconstruction of the Montsio (1888)
- Tower and dome of the Basilica of La Mercè
- Restoration of the Monastery of Pedralbes (1897)
- Building of the Societat de Crèdit Mercantil (1901, named by city government as the best new building in 1901)
- Monument to Joan Güell (1901)
- Robert House, currently Palau Robert (1898–1903)
- Saint Ignatius of Loyola School (The Sarrià Jesuits) 1893-1896
- Palace and garden of the Finca Güell (now Palau Reial de Pedralbes)

Outside of Barcelona:

- Parish Church of Santa Maria in Portbou
- Parish Church of Castellar del Vallès
- Monumental Rosary in Montserrat: fourth and fifth Joyful Mysteries, third and fourth Glorious Mysteries
- Palacio de Sobrellano in Comillas (1878–1890)
- Panteón de Sobranello (1881)
- Seminary of Comillas (1883, completed by Lluis Domenech i Montaner, now the headquarters of the Comillas Foundation)
