= Anna Dodas i Noguer =

Catalan poet (1962–1986)

- Born: 2 November 1962; Folgueroles, Spain
- Died: 13 August 1986 (aged 23); Brissac, France
- Education: University of Barcelona
- Occupations: Poet, Writer, Guitarist
- Writing career
- Language: Catalan
- Notable awards: Amadeu Oller Prize, 1986

Anna Dodas i Noguer (2 November 1962 – 13 August 1986) was a Catalan poet who was murdered at the age 23. Much of her work was published posthumously.

== Biography ==
Anna Dodas i Noguer was born on 2 November 1962 in Folgueroles on the Plain of Vic in the comarque of Osona in Catalonia in the northeast of Spain. Jacint Verdaguer, regarded as one of the greatest poets of Catalan literature, was born in the same town. Dodas Noguer was the youngest of six siblings. She studied Catalan philology at the University of Barcelona, graduating with a dissertation on the work Mites by ca: Jordi Sarsanedas. At the same time, she attended the Municipal Conservatory of Barcelona, where she continued her guitar studies, which she had begun at the Vic School of Music in Barcelona. She performed as a soloist in various locations in Catalonia, and eventually also accompanied the group Camerata de Cançó Tradicional.

== Writing ==
Dodas Noguer wrote essays and short stories, but became most notable for her poetry. From a very young age, she took part in literary competitions and won local prizes. In 1986, she won the Amadeu Oller Prize for her 13-part poem Landscape with Winter, which was subsequently included in an anthology compiled by one of the members of the judging panel, Maria Mercè Marçal, titled Emerging landscape: Thirty Catalan poets of the twentieth century. A collection of the poems of Dodas Noguer, El Volcà (The Volcano), was published posthumously in 1991 and was reprinted in 2015. Her essays were published in 2018 in the book Capvespres de foc i de grana (Sunsets of fire and crimson), edited by Caterina Riba and Ester Pou, which included nine previously published essays and four unpublished ones.

In 1984 Dodas Noguer was part of the jury for the Antoni Pous de Vic Literary Awards and contributed to two issues of the History of Catalan Literature published by Edicions 62. She also worked as a proof-reader in that publishing house.

== Critical appreciation ==
The poem, Landscape with Winter, has been described as "blending the fragmented images of a snowy landscape with moments of gentle, philosophical questioning". Her English translator has compared it with the work of the American poet, Sylvia Plath. Another review considers that her work conveys "with its intensity and rawness an existential discomfort and shows, despite her youth, a soul convulsed by pain". Maria Mercè Marçal noted that "among the hundreds of verses you have to read in the often-tedious role of a member of a jury, a few poems make you feel that you are willing to defend them fiercely. Even more so because there is no real or false modesty involved. These are poems that I wish I had written".

== Publications ==
=== Poetry ===
- Paisatge amb hivern. (Landscape with Winter). 1986.
- El volcà. (The Volcano). 1991.
- The Volcano. English translation of El volcà. (Francis Boutle) 2022.

=== Short stories ===
- Capvespres de foc i de grana (Sunsets of fire and crimson). Ausa magazine No. 101. 1982. (Reprinted by Edicions Cal-lígraf, 2018).
- La deessa de les flors (The Goddess of the Flowers). Ed. Clot. 1982.
- Les ciutats (The cities). Ausa. 1991.

== Death ==
Dodas Noguer died around 13 August 1986. Together with a friend, Gemma Argemí, she was planning to go to Sardinia. To save money they decided to hitchhike to Toulon in France or Genoa in Italy to catch a ferry. They disappeared and their bodies were found on 17 August near Brissac, north of Montpellier in the south of France. They had been murdered.

== Awards and honours ==
- Second prize in the Calldetenes City Council Award (Osona) for Goddess of flowers.
- First Prize of the City council of Vic (1981) for Sunsets of fire and pomegranate.
- Amadeu Oller Prize for poetry (1986) for Landscape with Winter.
- The Anna Dodas Poetry Awards are held every two years.
