= Catalan Americans =

Americans of Catalan birth or descent

Catalano-estatunidencs (Catalan) Catalano-estadounidenses (Spanish)

Total population
- 1,738

Regions with significant populations
- California · Michigan · Texas · New York

Languages
- American English · Catalan · Spanish · French · Italian · Sardinian · Occitan (Aranese dialect)

Religion
- Roman Catholic (predominant) · Protestant · and other religions

Related ethnic groups
- European Americans (including French and Italian Americans) · Hispanic Americans · Catalan people and other groups of the Catalan diaspora

Catalan Americans (Catalan: Catalano-estatunidencs, Spanish: Catalano-estadounidenses) are Americans of Catalan descent. The group is formed by Catalan-born naturalized citizens or residents, their descendants and, to a lesser extent, citizens or residents of Catalan descent who still acknowledge Catalan ancestry.

The Catalan or Catalonian ancestry is identified with the code 204 in the 2000 U.S. census, with the name Catalonian, A total of 1,738 individuals who received the long-form Census questionnaire (which is given to 1 in 6 households) self-identified as Catalan Americans. In the same survey 1,660 people aged 5 or older indicated being able to speak the Catalan language, also with the name Catalonian. Because the long-form samples a sixth of the population, that figure puts the estimate of Catalan speakers in the US in 2000 at around 10,000 people. However, 22,047 people born in Catalonia live in the United States.

Some Catalonians self-identify as White American rather than Hispanic Americans.

== Notable people ==
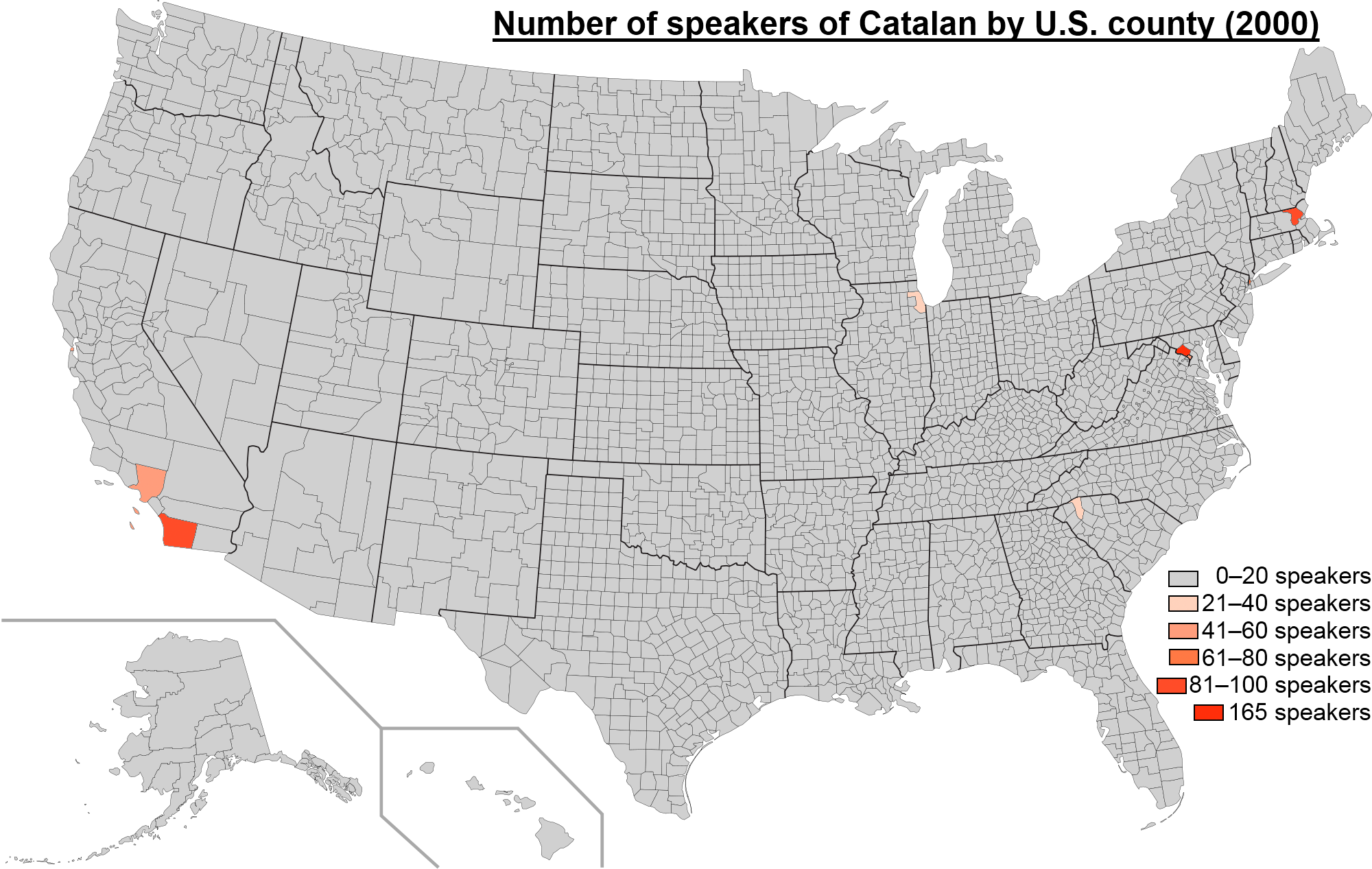
Map of U.S. counties highlighting from grey to orange the number of speakers of Catalan

- Jacqueline Alemany, journalist and political reporter who serves as congressional correspondent for The Washington Post
- Felipe Alfau (1902–1999), novelist and poet
- Thaddeus Amat y Brusi (1810–1878), Bishop of Monterey–Los Angeles
- Leonardo Balada (born 1933), composer
- Francesc Burgos, artist
- Nini Camps, folk rock singer-songwriter
- Maria Canals-Barrera (born 1966), actress and singer
- John Casablancas, founder of Elite Model agency
- Julian Casablancas (born 1978), singer with the rock band The Strokes
- Xavier Cugat (1900–1990), bandleader
- Pedro de Alberni (1747–1802), governor of Las Californias
- Pedro Fages (1734–1794), governor of Las Californias
- Ernest Fenollosa (1853–1908), professor of philosophy and political economy
- Alex Ferrer (born 1960), judge in the courtroom television show Judge Alex
- Danay Ferrer (born 1974)
- Fernando Ferrer (born 1950), politician in The Bronx, New York City
- Frank Ferrer, American rock drummer and session musician
- Jorge Ferrer, author
- José Ferrer (1912–1992), actor
- Manuel Y. Ferrer, American virtuoso guitarist
- Àstrid Bergès-Frisbey, actress
- Valentín Fuster (born 1943), cardiologist
- Martin Garralaga (1894–1981), film and television actor
- Andreu Garriga (1843–1915), priest and ethnobotanical writer
- Marc Gasol (born 1985), NBA player
- Pau Gasol (born 1980), NBA player
- Joseph Miró (born 1946), politician
- Francisco Mora y Borrell (1827–1905), Bishop of Monterey–Los Angeles
- Gaspar de Portolà i Rovira (1716–1784), explorer and governor of California (1767–1770) and founder of San Diego
- Prefuse73, musician
- Manny Puig (born 1954), entertainer
- George Rabasa (born 1941), writer
- Joseph Sadoc Alemany (1814–1888), Roman Catholic archbishop and missionary
- Xavier Sala-i-Martin (born 1962), professor of economics at Columbia University
- Josh Segarra (born 1986), actor
- Assumpta Serna (born 1957), actress
- Oriol Servià (born 1974), race car driver in the IndyCar Series
- Carmen Reid, American–Catalonian Spanish teacher and Fulbright scholar

== See also ==
- Catalan people
