= Canigó (poem) =

Poem by Jacint Verdaguer (1886)

Mount Canigó: A Tale of Catalonia
- Title page of the 1901 edition
- Author: Jacint Verdaguer
- Original title: Canigó: llegenda pirenaica del temps de la Reconquesta
- Translator: Ronald Puppo
- Language: Catalan
- Genre: Epic poetry
- Set in: Mount Canigó, 11th century
- Published: 1886
- Publisher: Llibreria Catòlica, Barcino-Tamesis
- Publication place: Catalonia (Spain)
- English publication date: 2015
- Pages: 238
- ISBN: 978 1 85566 298 8
- Dewey Decimal: 821.134.1-1
- Original text: Canigó: llegenda pirenaica del temps de la Reconquesta at Catalan Wikisource

Mount Canigó: A Tale of Catalonia, (Note: Originally in Catalan, Canigó: Llegenda pirenaica dels temps de la Reconquesta; in English, "Canigó: Pyrenean legend from the times of the Reconquista".) often referred to simply as Canigó, is an 1886 epic poem written by Catalan Renaixença poet Jacint Verdaguer. Set in the Pyrenees around the early 11th century, it tells a highly fictionalized account of the origins of Catalonia.

== Genesis ==
Jacint Verdaguer conceived the poem between 1879 and 1880 after a stay at Vallespir, one of the historical comarcas through which the massif of Canigó spreads. There he witnessed the ruins of the abbeys of Sant Miquel de Cuixà and Sant Martí del Canigó, in the neighboring comarca of Conflent, which inspired him to write an elegy named Los dos campanars (Note: In modern Catalan, Els dos campanars. The use of the old definite article "los" instead of the modern "els" was already an archaism by the time Verdaguer wrote the poem.) ("The Two Bell Towers"), where the main characters of Canigó were already referenced. Under the influence of the writings of François-René de Chateaubriand on the ruins left by the French Revolution and the role of monuments in the shaping of nations, Verdaguer decided to build on that poem and expand it to compose Canigó.

In order to turn the poem into a full story, Verdaguer drew from the legends surrounding several characters from Catalonia's history, mainly the sons of Count Oliba Cabreta. Additionally, he was also inspired by the legend of the knight of Enveig, who fell in love with a fairy and provoked the destruction of the Monastery of Sant Andreu d'Eixalada.

Verdaguer first sketched the poem during the summer of 1880, and between 1882 and 1883 he embarked on a series of trips to the Pyrenees in order to acquire firsthand knowledge of their topography and flora and to collect a series of additional local legends that he would later on include in Canigó. He wrote a significant part of the poem during his month-and-a-half stay at the Sanctuary of Mare de Déu del Mont in 1884, from which Mount Canigó can be seen. By the autumn of 1885, the poem was already finished, and it was finally published in 1886. The 1901 edition incorporated the original poem, Los dos campanars, as an epilogue.

== Plot ==
The poem tells the story of a young nobleman named Gentil, the son of a legendary version of Count Tallaferro ("Count Ironcutter"). In the course of a war against the Saracenes, Gentil is kidnapped by fairies and taken to the mountains to marry their queen, Flordeneu (Catalan for "Edelweiss"). In the meantime, Tallaferro is captured by the Saracens, who keep gaining positions against the Christians. Guifré, (Note: Spelled "Guifre" in the original poem.) Gentil's uncle and Tallaferro's brother, finds the bride and groom at the top of Mount Canigó and, believing him to be a deserter, pushes him down the mountain, killing him in the act. Driven by guilt, Guifré leads a final strike against the Saracens; Tallaferro, in turn, manages to break free, and both brothers drive their army to the victory.

Later on, Guifré confesses the murder of Gentil and Tallaferro attempts to kill him, but Abbot Oliba (their younger brother) intervenes to save Guifré's life and to get Tallaferro to forgive him. In the end, Guifré builds the Abbey of Sant Martí del Canigó in order to wash away his sin.

== Themes ==
Canigó is considered one of the chief works of Catalan Romanticism and it contains many themes typically associated with that movement.

A Romantic trait that is particularly present in Canigó is the reverence for nature. The descriptions of the Pyrenees are thorough and highly detailed, and they reveal the author's extensive knowledge of their topography and flora. This fact, along with the title of the poem (named after Mount Canigó), has led some interpreters to consider landscape as the true protagonist of the story.

The topic of impossible love is also present in Canigó. This is most evident at the beginning of the story, when Gentil falls in love with Griselda, a shepherdess, which enrages his father, Count Tallaferro, because of the huge gap in social class. Later on, the fairy queen Flordeneu impersonates Griselda in order to seduce Gentil. The love relationship between these two characters also represents contact between opposite worlds, primarily due to the contrast between Gentil's Christian faith and the Islamic symbolism that surrounds fairies in the poem: they inhabit palaces with Islamic aesthetics, and Flordeneu's wedding dress is green (the colour of Islam). In addition to Islam, fairies also symbolize paganism.

Gentil has been noted to represent the prototype of a fallen hero because of his propensity to fall into evil (represented by the kingdom of the fairies, often compared to Milton's hell).

Canigó was intended as a national epic for Catalans, i.e. a literary referent that would grant Catalan literature a place among all the other national literatures – a common idea during Romanticism. This is most evident in its reverence for the Middle Ages and Christianity, which Verdaguer viewed as the root of Catalonia's origins. Its praise for the Pyrenean landscape has also been interpreted as praise for the homeland. The story incorporates many elements of Catalan folklore and traditions (Pyrenean falles, goges and many folk songs, among others) and it depicts the raising of the cross of Canigó, a national symbol for Catalans, under the orders of Abbot Oliba. This happens after the Saracens have been defeated and the fairies have departed from the mountains, which symbolizes a victory of Christianity over both Islam and paganism.

== Language and style ==
In Canigó, Verdaguer employs a rich rural lexicon popular among Catalan peasants and lower classes, but he integrates it with an epic and literary syle. Compared to his previous epic poem, L'Atlàntida, his language was perceived by his contemporaries as more refined and delightful.

The poem consists of 4,338 verses divided in 12 books and it contains an unusually high variety of meters. These correspond to the variety of tones and themes contained in the poem, from popular songs to the Medieval tradition and Renaissance-influenced epic poetry. Thus, the war-themed fragments generally employ decasyllabes divided in two hemistichs of 6 and 4 syllabes, in imitation of chansons de geste and medieval Catalan poets like Ausiàs March or Joan Roís de Corella, as well as earlier Romantic poets like Manuel Milà i Fontanals. The more lyrical sections, in turn often employ the forms typical of cançons and romanç (the Iberian variant of ballads). The chapter "Lo passatge d'Hanníbal" ("The Passage of Hannibal"), a retelling of Hannibal's march through the Pyrenees, employs alexandrine verses, which the author had already used in L'Atlàntida (perhaps under the influence of Bonaventura Carles Aribau).

== Reception and legacy ==
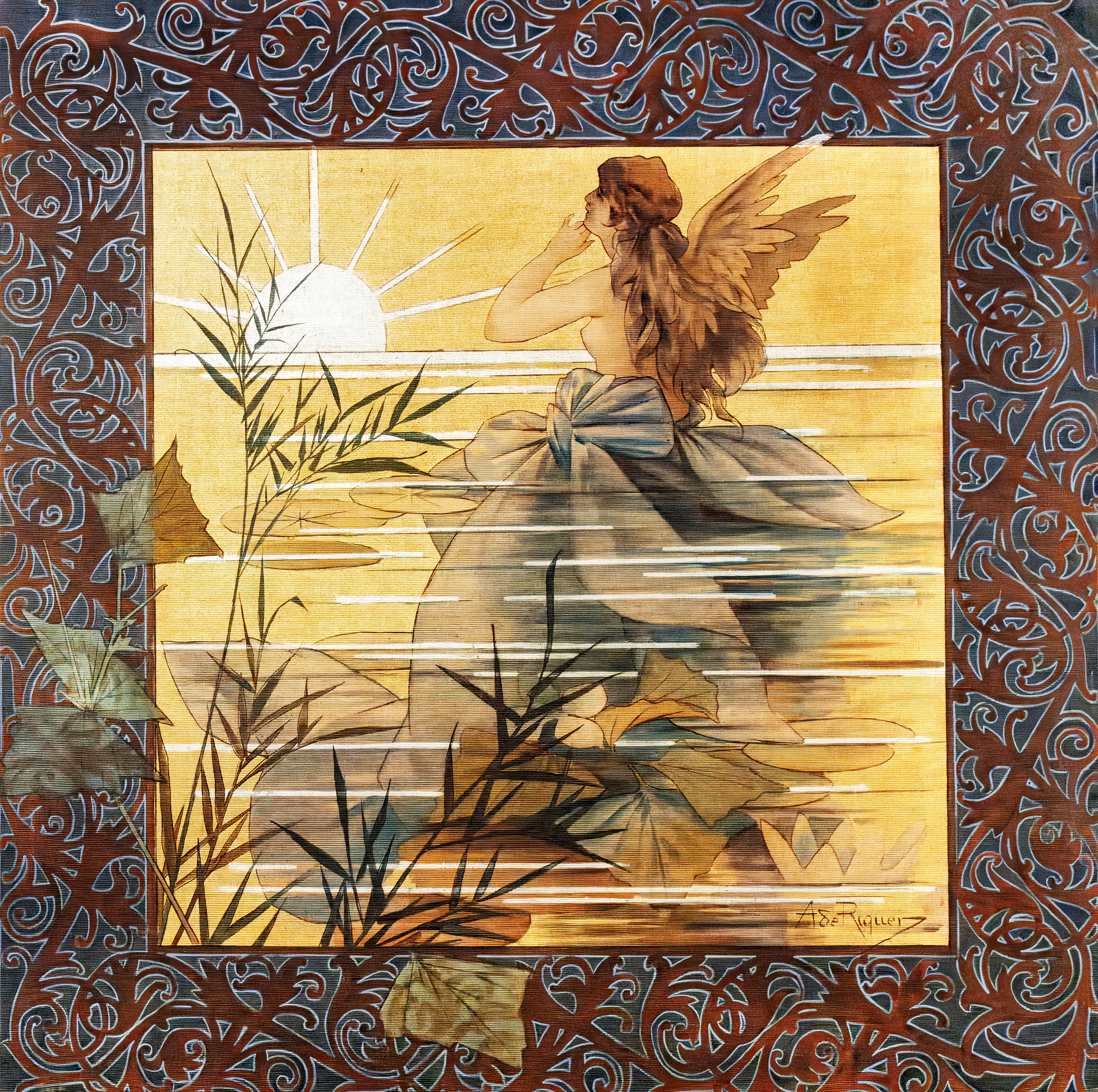
A modernist fairy by Alexandre de Riquer.

When Verdaguer wrote his poem, literary Catalan was often perceived as an unruly, rustic and impoverished language full of foreign interferences. Verdaguer's works, and specially Canigó, are often seen as a turning point in this respect, for it is often credited with having shaped contemporary literary Catalan.

The poem was well received by critics when it was released, and it drew many comparison's to Victor Hugo's La Légende des siècles. However, its perceived lack of focus on a single theme was often criticized, and reviewers from the Catholic-leaning press usually noted it to be inferior to L'Atlàntida (Verdaguer's previous poem), an opinion that current critics generally do not share. It received praise from Spanish philologist Marcelino Menéndez Pelayo, who called Verdaguer "the poet with the best storytelling skills among those who live today in Spain's lands".

Fairies are a recurrent topic in Catalan Art Noveau, where they are often depicted either as spirits of nature or as evil seductresses of men. This has been attributed to the influence exerted by Canigó. This influence was particularly strong on Alexandre de Riquer, who illustrated the first edition of the book and who was particularly fond of fairies.

== Translations and adaptations ==
It was translated into Spanish as early as the same year it was first published, in 1886, although a full translation did not appear until 1898. A French version appeared in 1889, and a fragmentary Italian version was published in 1887. It was first translated into English by James William Millard in 2000 under the name Canigó, a Legend of the Pyrenees, albeit only fragmentarily. The first full English translation was made by Ronald Puppo in 2015, who entitled it Mount Canigó: a Tale from Catalonia.

It has also been adapted as a stage play, and many of its fragments have been set to music.

== See also ==
- Oliba Cabreta, count of Cerdanya and Besalú, the father of the main characters of Canigó.
- House of Barcelona, the dynasty to which Oliba Cabreta and his sons belonged.
- Àngel Guimerà, the main Catalan Renaixença playwright and also a poet, who shared many themes with Verdaguer.
- Northern Catalonia, the region which inspired Canigó.
