= Atlántida (opera) =

Opera by Manuel de Falla

- Unfinished opera by Manuel de Falla
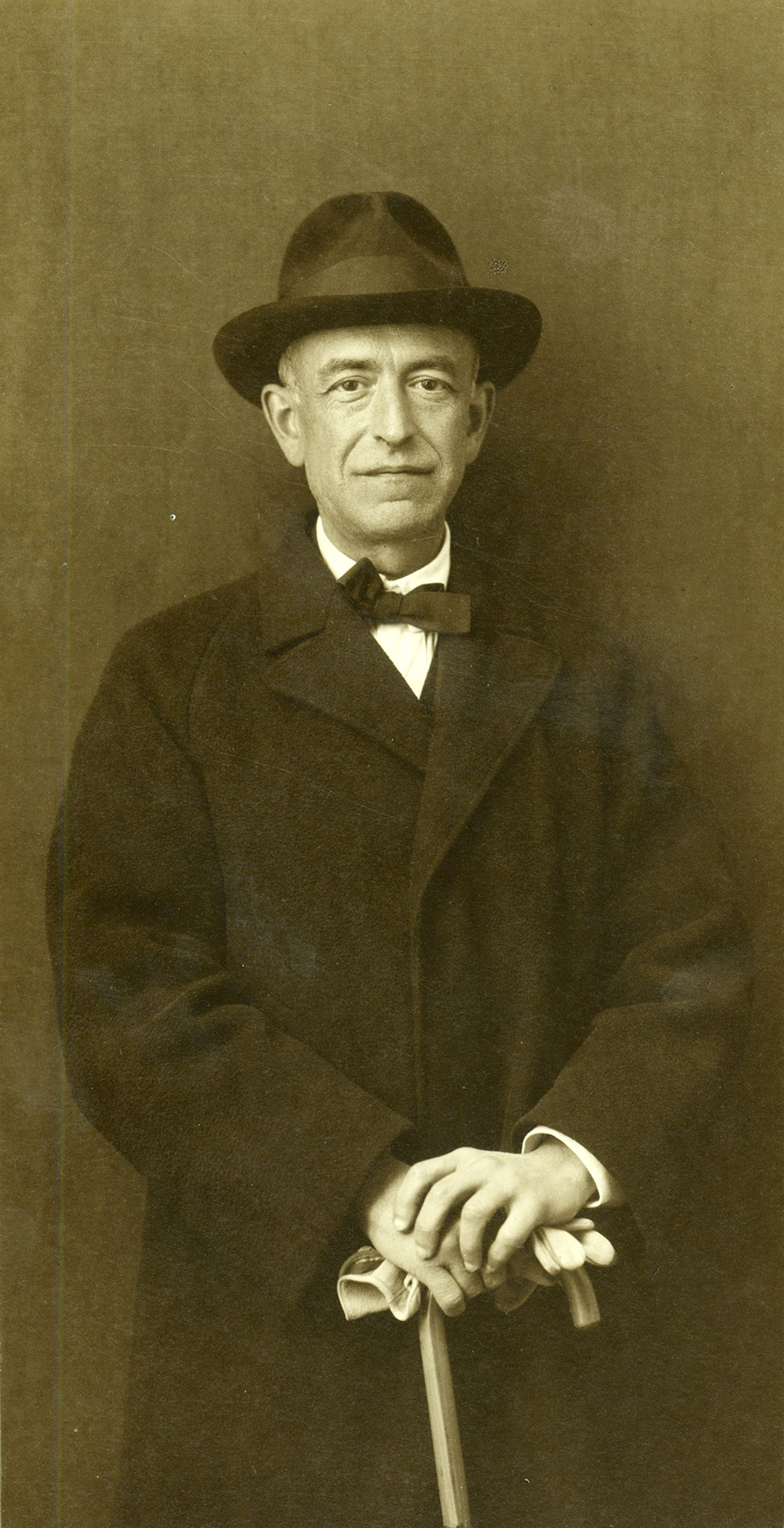
- The composer
- Description: cantata escénica
- Translation: Atlantis
- Language: Catalan
- Based on: L'Atlàntida by Jacint Verdaguer
- Premiere: 18 June 1962 (completed by Ernesto Halffter); Teatro alla Scala, Milan

Atlántida (Atlantis) is an opera (titled a 'cantata escénica') in a prologue and three parts, by Manuel de Falla, based on the Catalan poem L'Atlàntida by Jacint Verdaguer. Falla worked on the score for twenty years but had not completed it at his death in Argentina in 1946; his disciple Ernesto Halffter prepared the score for performance.

== Original legend on which the opera is based ==
Verdaguer brought together pre-history and history: a child (Christopher Columbus) is the sole survivor of a shipwreck of a Genoese boat off the Spanish coast. After reaching shore, he is adopted by a hermit who recounts the history of the earth and seas. He begins the legend with Alcide (Heracles) arriving from Greece to attack the Atlanteans reaching the Spanish side of the Pyrenees. He finds a huge fire started by Geryon, a three-headed African monster. King Tubal of the Pyrenees is killed and his daughter Pyrene gives her father to Alcide imploring him to set forth to kill the monster, before dying. Alcide decides to make a port where a white barque (barca) had landed. After arriving in Cádiz from Barcelona, Alcide goes to the Hesperides, finds the orange tree, Atlas's widow and three daughters, and kills the dragon wrapped in the tree defending the entry to the continent. The Hesperides die (ascending to the heavens as the Pleiades) and Alcide returns to Cádiz; he kills Geryon and sees the waters break over Mount Calpe and rush over Atlantis. Still accompanied by the hermit, the adult Columbus dreams of unlocking the mystery of Atlantis and appeals to Queen Isabella of Spain who gives him jewels to pay for his venture. The old man bids Columbus to fly.

== Composition and performance history ==
Atlántida started in 1926 as a cantata, but grew over 20 years to become a full opera. The poem suited him as he responded fully to its blend of mythology and primitive Iberia, and the setting of Cádiz, his home city. He visited many of the sites referred to in the epic: Jerez de la Frontera, Sanlúcar de Barrameda, the temple of Hercules, Medina-Sidonia, Tarifa and its castle. Falla died in Argentina before he finished the work, leaving a loose collection of sketches. Ernesto Halffter undertook the long work of editing and completion. The music shows the influence of classical models from Spanish polyphony, 17th-century monody, and of 16th-century or earlier choral writing.

It is not a true opera, more a stage cantata, where the chorus takes a principal role, interrupted by Coryphaeus as the narrator. Sometimes this narration of the action is depicted on the stage by the appropriate characters (some singers, some – Hercules and Columbus – actors).

When finally completed, large extracts were performed in a concert version at the Liceu, Barcelona, in November 1961, conducted by Eduard Toldrà, with Victoria de los Ángeles as Isabella, and in Cádiz. The following June it was presented in a staged production conducted by Thomas Schippers at La Scala, Milan, in Italian, with Lino Puglisi, Giulietta Simionato and Teresa Stratas and produced by Margherita Wallmann, (according to the Opera magazine reviewer this performance took three hours.) then in Berlin and Buenos Aires, and America conducted by Ernest Ansermet. The score was withdrawn by Halffter after this while he made further revisions; a shorter version was heard in concert form in Lucerne in 1976 and a longer definitive version heard at the Granada Festival the following year prior to a studio recording at the Teatro Real.

The opera has three major singing roles: the narrator Corifeo (baritone), an old man who tells Columbus of the sinking of Atlantis, Queen Pyrene (mezzo-soprano), and Queen Isabella (soprano), then minor roles such as the three-headed Geryones (three tenors).

== Roles ==
Roles, voice types, premiere cast
Role	Voice type	Premiere cast, 18 June 1962 Conductor: Thomas Schippers
Corifeu	baritone	Lino Puglisi
Pirene	mezzo-soprano	Giulietta Simionato
Isabel I de Castella	soprano	Teresa Stratas
Archangel		Antonio Greco
Gerió el Tricèfal I	tenor	Pier Francesco Poli
Gerió el Tricèfal II	tenor	Piero de Palma
Gerió el Tricèfal III	barítone	Sergio Pezzetti
Maria	soprano	Gianna Galli
Aretusa	soprano	Mirella Fiorentini
Caleno	mezzo-soprano	Marina Cucchio
Eritea	soprano	Nama Nardi
Electra	mezzo-soprano	Sonnette Heyns
Esperetusa	mezzo-soprano	Biancamaria Casoni
Alcione	contralto	Laura Didier-Gambardella
Lady of the court	mezzo-soprano	Maria Grazia Allegri
A child		Antonio Di Minno
Hercules	actor / mime	Roger Browne
Chorus

== Synopsis ==
In the first part, Christopher Columbus, as a boy, is shipwrecked on an island. To console him an Old Man tells him the legend of Atlantis, the fabled land wiped out by Hercules and submerged at the bottom of the sea off the coast of Spain. To the spot – the Pillars of Hercules – Columbus, now a grown man, comes and dreams of crossing the ocean. Isabella of Spain provides him with the means and he discovers the New World and claims it for Christendom. The work is both an epic of Catholic Spain and its mission in the world, but treated with poetic dignity and classical restraint.

== Recordings ==
A live recording of the 1962 stage premiere at La Scala in Milan was issued by Memories HR on two CDs in 1993.

- Complete: Enriqueta Tarrés, Anna Ricci i Giraudo, Vicenç Sardinero; Escolanía de Nuestra Señora del Recuerdo, Chorus and National Orchestra of Spain conducted by Rafael Frühbeck de Burgos. EMI, 1978, two LPs
- Complete: Simon Estes, María Bayo, Teresa Berganza; Coral Universitat de less Illes Balears. Coro Polifonico Universitario de la Laguna. Orfeon Navarra Reverter. Orfeon Universitario Simon Bolivar. Pequenos Cantores de Valencia. Joven Orquesta Nacional de España, Edmon Colomer. Valois, 1992, two CDs
