= Oda nova a Barcelona =

1909 poem by Joan Maragall

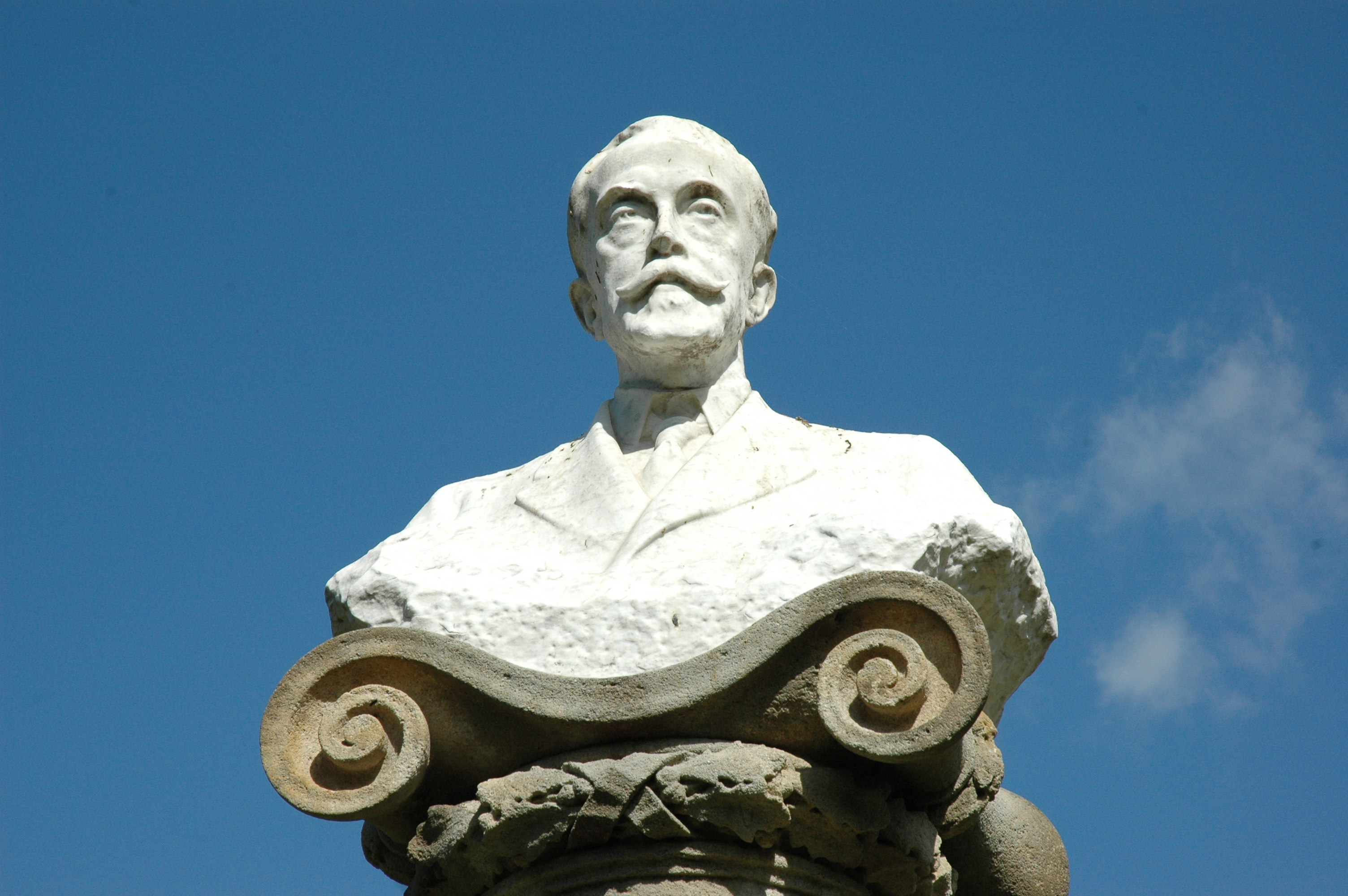
Statue of Joan Maragall, by Eusebi Arnau, at the Parc de la Ciutadella in Barcelona

Oda nova a Barcelona (Catalan: New ode to Barcelona) is a poem by Joan Maragall, written in 1909, two years before his death. It contains the topic of fascination with Barcelona, appearing as a temptress, as well as Catalan nationalist elements, and the linguistic situation reflecting on ongoing violence in the city, similarly to Paternal, which was set against the backdrop of the 1893 anarchist bombing of the Liceu. It poses the problem of war and urban violence, and the possibility of allegiance and regeneration.

The full, annotated text of the poem is included in One Day of Life is Life: Joan Maragall, edited and translated by Ronald Puppo.

== See also ==
- A Barcelona, by Jacint Verdaguer
- Barcelona ja no és bona, by Jaime Gil de Biedma
