= Fia-Faia =

Catalonian christmas tradition

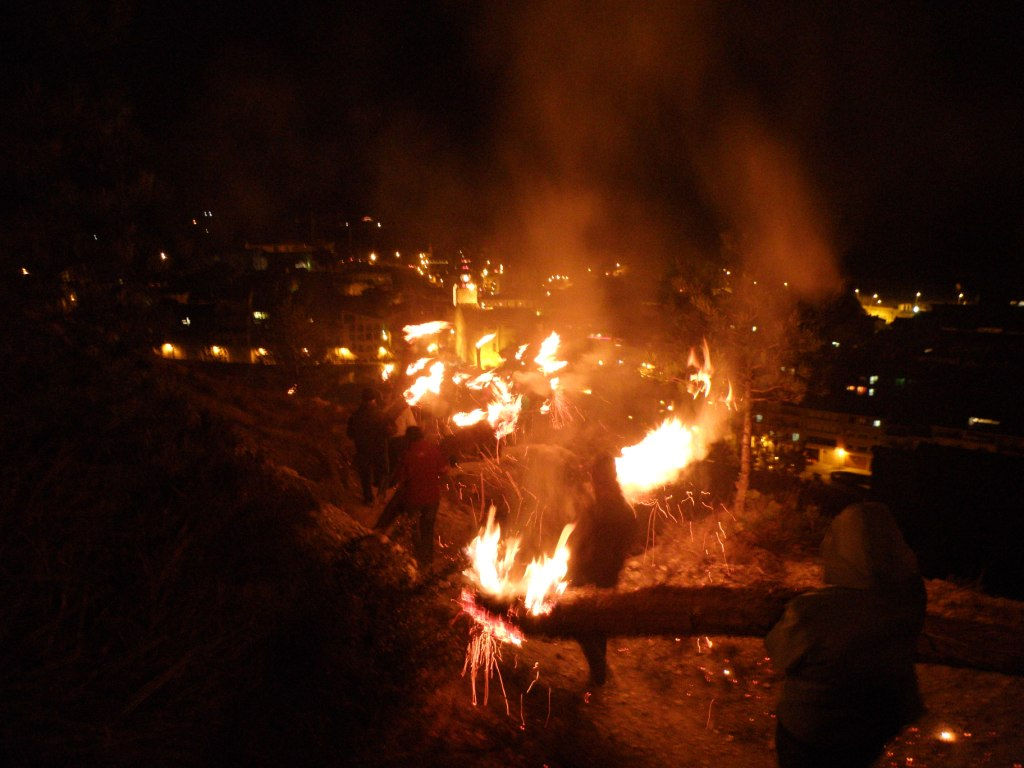
Fia-Faia in 2008

Fia-Faia is a Christmas tradition with pre-Christian roots celebrated on 24 December in the towns of Bagà and Sant Julià de Cerdanyola, Catalonia. The Government of Catalonia declared it a heritage festival of national interest on 16 November 2010. A few years later, in 2015, it was added to the UNESCO Intangible Cultural Heritage Lists together with the summer solstice fire festivals in the Pyrenees.

The festival revolves around burning torches (faies) after the traditional call to prayer on Christmas Eve. The fire is first started in the mountains, where the sun sets, and it is then brought to the towns by a group of fallaires in a dazzling display of lights against the night sky. Once in town, the fire-bearers share the fire with the rest of fallaires while those present chant Fia-faia, que nostro senyor ha nascut a la paia ('Let there be torches, for our Lord was born on hay').

== Origins ==
The festival's pre-Christian roots probably lie in a winter solstice ritual in which participants would have stood in collective prayer to stop the shortening of the days. Although the origins of this celebration of the winter solstice and the birth of Jesus Christ are lost to history, there are no doubts that it was already in place when Bagà was established in the mid-14th century.
