= Verdaguer House Museum =

Coordinates: 41°56′18″N 2°19′01″E

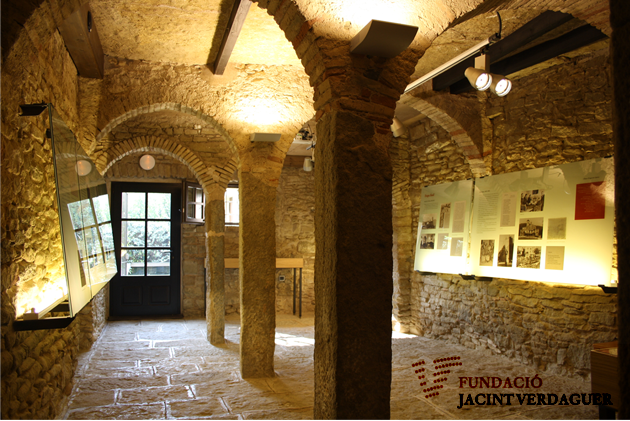
Interior of the Verdaguer House Museum

The Verdaguer House Museum (Catalan: Casa Museu Verdaguer) is a literary museum in Folgueroles, birthplace of poet Jacint Verdaguer, in the region of Osona. It was opened in 1967 and is part of the Barcelona Provincial Council Local Museum Network.

== Building ==
The Verdaguer House Museum is located in a 17th-century house occupied by Josep Verdaguer and his wife, Josepa Santaló, (parents of Jacint Verdaguer) between 1841 and 1847, when the poet was two years old.

== Exhibition ==
The exhibition area is structured on three floors: on the first floor is the permanent exhibition, which takes visitors through the stages of the poet's life; the second floor shows what a typical kitchen and bedroom were decorated like in the 19th century, time in which young Jacint lived; on the third floor there is a space dedicated to temporary exhibitions and another to the artist Perejaume, as well as an audiovisual presentation on the life and work of Jacint Verdaguer.

== See also ==
- Jacint Verdaguer
