= Compañía General de Tabacos de Filipinas =

Manufacturer in the Philippines

Compañía General de Tabacos de Filipinas, S.A.
- Company shipping line house flag

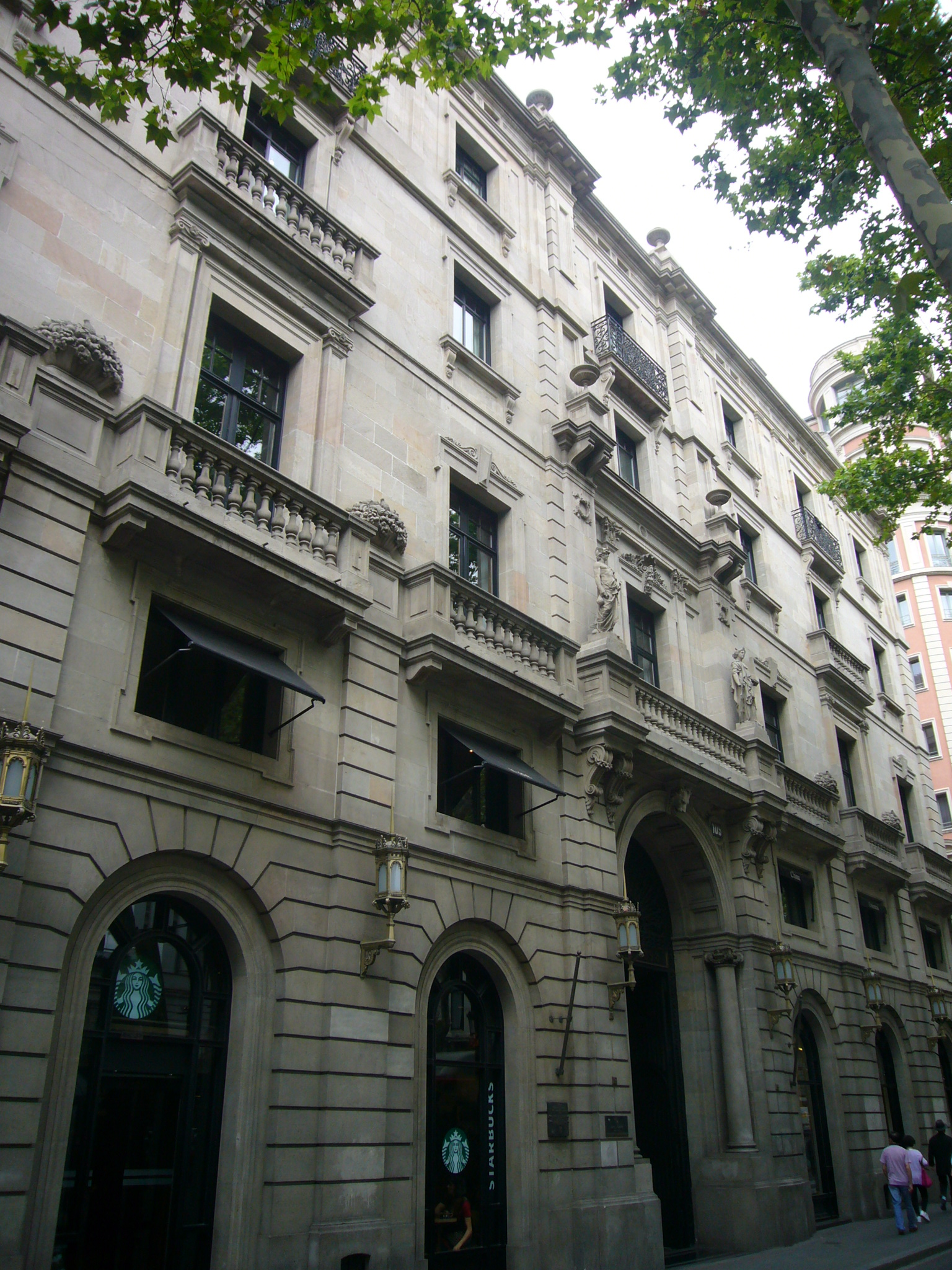
- The original headquarters in Barcelona, Spain
- Company type: Sociedad Anónima
- Industry: Tobacco; Liquor; Sugar; Transportation
- Founded: 1881
- Founder: Antonio L. López, 1st Marquess of Comillas
- Headquarters: Manila, Philippines
- Key people: Manuel Meler (Chairman)
- Number of employees: 104,000 (1898)

The Compañía General de Tabacos de Filipinas, S.A. (General Tobacco Company of the Philippines, abbreviated CdF), also known as the Compañía Española de Tabacos de Filipinas, was a Spanish multinational joint-stock company, one of the world's most important enterprises in the late 19th and early 20th century, and the Philippines' first private tobacco company. Founded by the 1st Marquess of Comillas in Barcelona in 1881 and based in Manila, it is also simply known as Tabacos de Filipinas in Spain, and as La Tabacalera in the Philippines.

Although the company today specializes in tobacco trading, over the years the company also ran a shipping line and established factories with the aim of cultivating, trading, manufacturing, and commercializing tobacco from the Philippines. It also expanded its interests beyond tobacco, engaging in the exploitation of sugar and alcohol distribution, copra, abacá and maguey, as well as owning significant interests in electricity generation, transport and insurance.

Owned by Spanish interests for most of its history, the Compañía General de Tabacos de Filipinas was in sharp decline between the 1950s and 1990s, during which it sold most of its ancillary businesses in the Philippines to focus solely on international tobacco trading. In 2007, it merged with the Dutch tobacco trading company Lippoel Leaf, forming the CdF International Group, and in 2011, CdF merged again with the American tobacco trading company Hail & Cotton, with the company itself continuing to exist as its Philippine subsidiary.

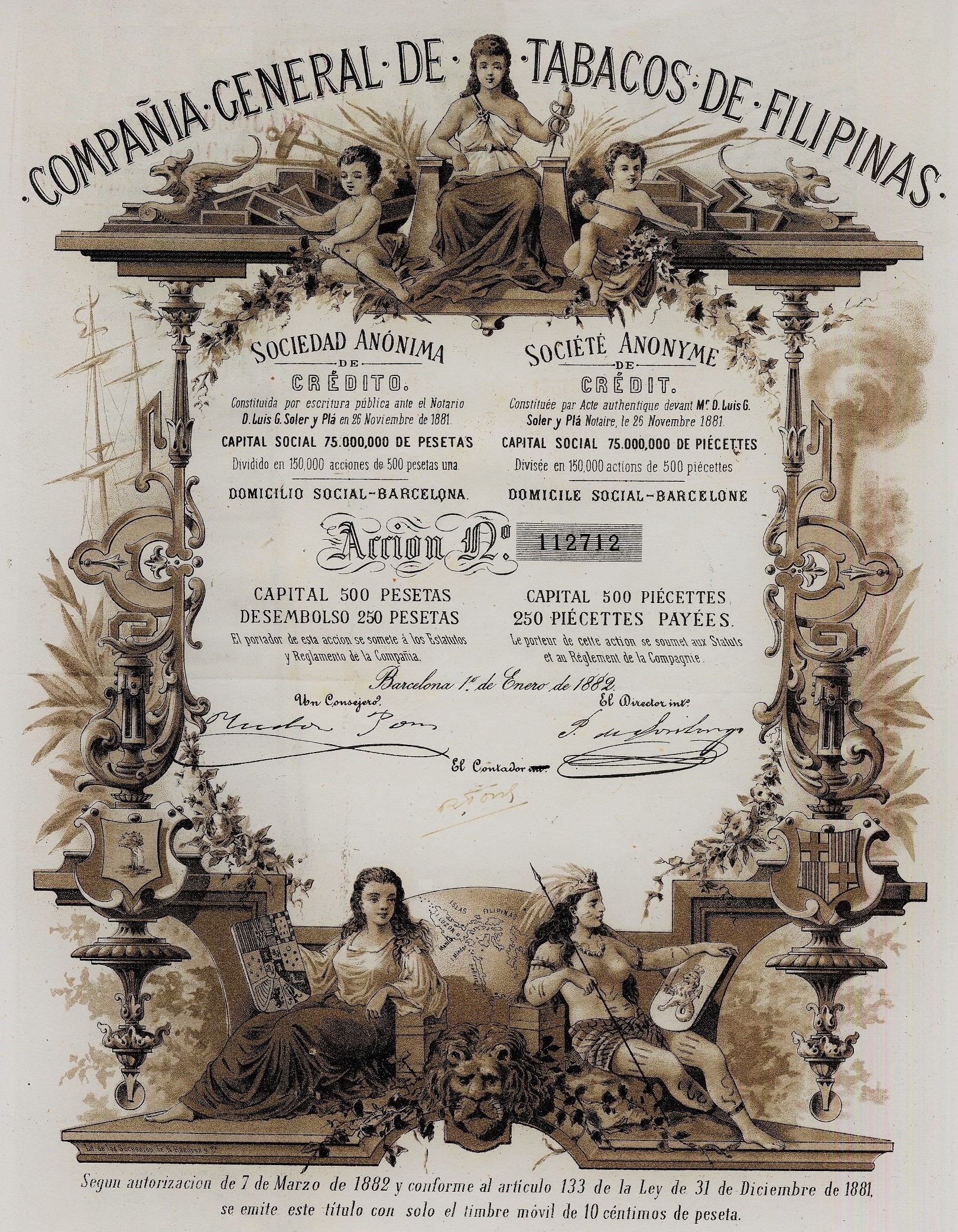
Stock certificate, 1881

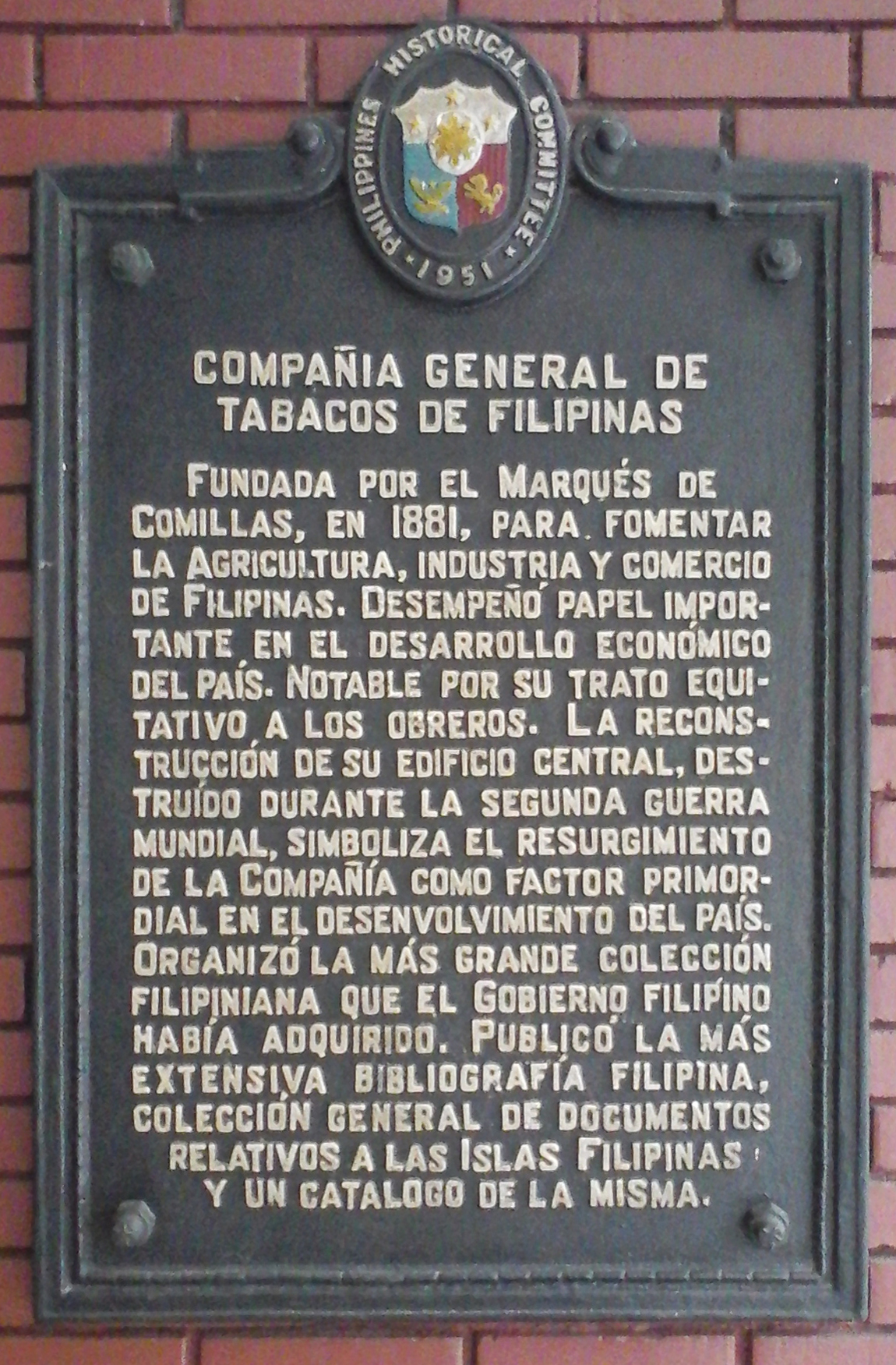
Historical marker in Manila

== Activities ==
- Production and sale of tobacco products.
- Running an ocean line for the transport of merchandise and passengers.
- Commercializing forest products beginning in 1892.
- Production and sale of sugar and alcohol beginning in 1893.
- Production of copra.
- Production of abacá fibre, also known as 'Manila hemp'.
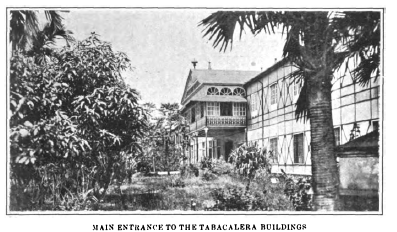
  Compania General de Tabaco de Filipinas Building in Manila, Philippines. Snippet from the Manila Times, 1911
- Production of maguey fibre.

== Markets ==
Regarding distribution, the company operated in three markets:

- Spanish market (Peninsular).
- European market, trading with countries like United Kingdom, Germany, the Netherlands, and Portugal.
- Philippines, the rest of Asia and Oceania.

== Credits ==
The National Historical Institute issued a marker along Romualdez St. in Ermita, Manila in 1951. The marker commends the company for the important role it played in the economic development in the Philippines and for the company's fair treatment of its workers. It also notes that the reconstruction of its central office after World War II symbolizes the reemergence of the company as a key player in the country's progress. The Compañía General de Tabacos de Filipinas is credited to have organized the largest Filipiniana collection that the Philippine Government has acquired.

== See also ==
- 1929 Barcelona International Exposition
- Compañía Transatlántica Española
- Compañía General de Tabacos de Filipinas v. Collector of Internal Revenue
