= Andreu Garriga =

Spanish-born priest, writer (1843–1915)

Andreu Garriga (also known as Andrew Garriga) (December 19, 1843, Vic, Osona, Spain – March 27, 1915, San Luis Obispo, California) was a Catalan-American Roman Catholic priest, poet, and writer. Garriga is best known for his role in the early career of Catalan poet Jacint Verdaguer and later for his writing on California ethnobotany.

== Early life and poetry ==
Garriga began writing poetry while a seminary student at the Seminari de Vic. Garriga's poetry is best known for the influence it had on a young Jacint Verdaguer, a key Catalan literary figure and at the time, a fellow seminarian at Vic. While studying as a seminarian in Vic, Garriga published some satirical décimas under the pseudonym "Samsonier Tocasons", entitled Entusiasme d'un estudiant per la cresta (1863), which was widely disseminated and became quite well known among his contemporaries. This would in turn influence Verdaguer to write his first published work of poetry, in the same decimist style, titled Als estudiants. Recepta (1864). Hence, as a poet, Garriga is not so much remembered for his own work, but for having motivated the publication of Verdaguer's first text, though in a style far removed from what Verdaguer would become later known for. In 1867, while still residing in Vic, he took the opportunity to write an unpublished collection, Recordances de ma vida (Remembrances of My Life), a set of five poems, consisting of personal anecdotes and reflections.

Garriga continued his studies for the priesthood at All Hallows College in Dublin, where he was ordained in 1868.

== In California ==
In 1868, he emigrated to San Francisco, serving as curate of the Saint Francis of Assisi Church until 1875. In 1875, the Archbishop of San Francisco Joseph Sadoc Alemany appointed Garriga as parish priest of the largely Spanish-speaking Our Lady of Guadalupe Church.

In 1890, Garriga left San Francisco and was incardinated in the Diocese of Monterey-Los Angeles, which covered all of Central and Southern California, serving as a pastor in many parishes of that diocese, including Fresno, Bakersfield, Gonzales and King City, Ontario, and finally San Luis Obispo. He also spent several years in Mexico in between his assignments in Bakersfield and Gonzales and King City.

From 1900 to 1905, Garriga was parish priest for the churches in both Gonzales and King City, in southern Monterey County. The territory of this combined parish included the then-abandoned Mission San Antonio de Padua and a rural population in the surrounding area of Jolon that included many people descended from Antoniaño Mission Indians and Californios. In 1903, Garriga attempted to have the mission rebuilt, hosting outings at the site and raising funds for the project, working closely with Joseph R. Knowland and other leaders of the California Historical Landmarks League to restore the mission. Only a small part of the reconstruction was completed while Garriga was in charge of the parish, and it suffered further damage in the 1906 San Francisco earthquake.

Garriga developed an interest in the folk medicine of the local people, continuing documentation of these practices that had been started by Doroteo Ambris, who had been parish priest of Mission San Antonio de Padua prior to the mission's abandonment in 1883. He compiled a manuscript, although it is unknown to what degree he was working from earlier notes by Ambris and how much he had documented directly from the oral traditions of his parishioners. The treatise, Compilation of Herbs & Remedies Used by the Indians & Spanish Californians remained unpublished at the time of his death. The manuscript was passed along to Father Zephyrin Engelhardt, who published an abridged version of the work as an appendix to his 1929 history of Mission San Antonio de Padua. This abridged version, with additional notes about the botanical identification of the plants named in the publication, was republished in 1950. In 1978, Monsignor Francis J. Weber, archivist for the Archdiocese of Los Angeles, obtained Garriga's original manuscript, and recognizing its historical and ethnological importance, edited and published the work in full.

Garriga was also the author of several religious works, Counsels for All Colors and Truths of All Flavors and Advice to Good Catholics on the Practice of Their Religion, both in English, with Counsels having a Spanish edition as well.
