= A Barcelona =

1883 poem by Jacint Verdaguer

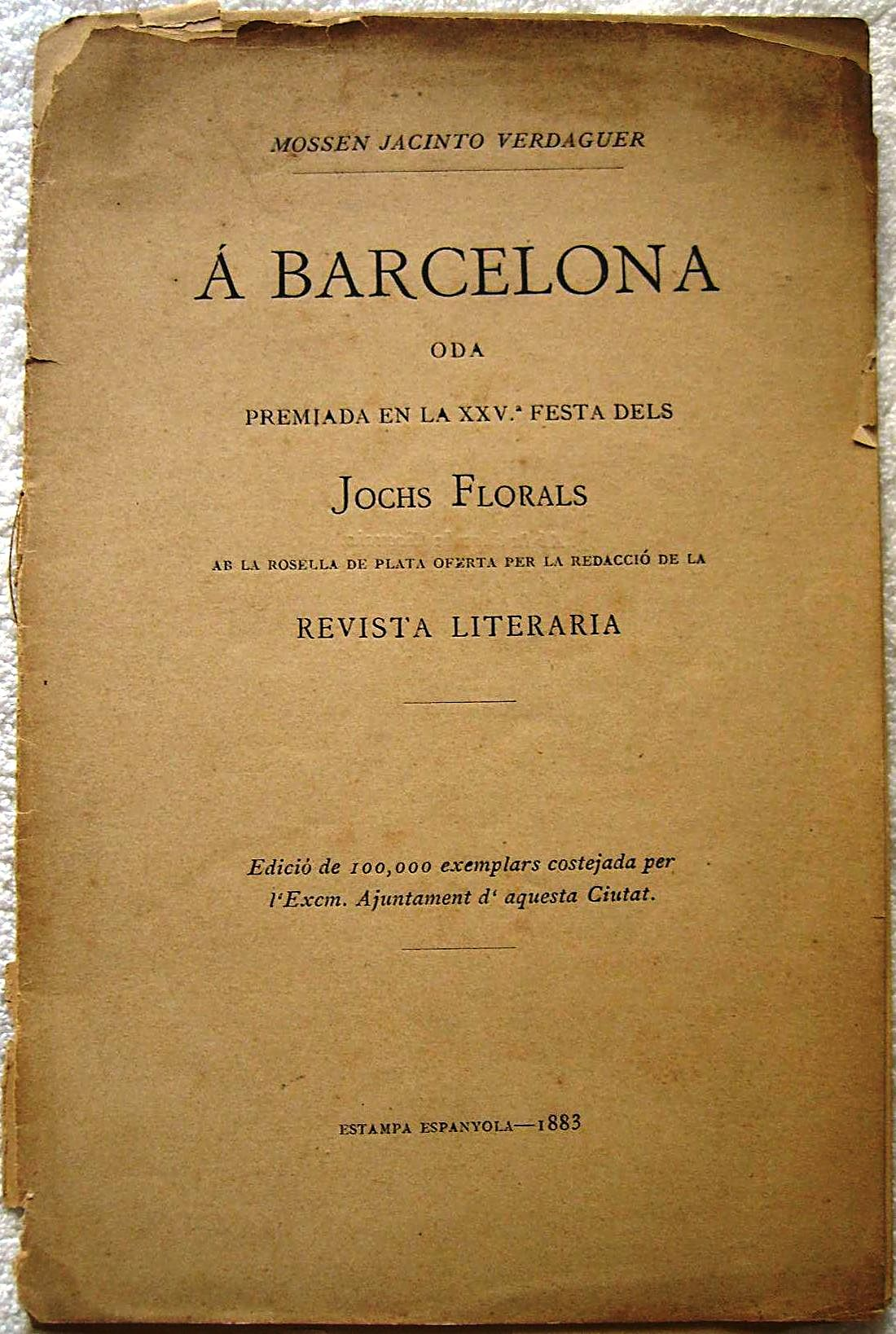
"A Barcelona" by Jacint

"A Barcelona" is a poem by Jacint Verdaguer, published in 1883. It is a triumphant song of the transformation undergone by Barcelona since the mid-19th century.

Consisting of 46 quatrains of Alexandrine verses, and a re-editing process started in 1874 and completed in 1875, it is the fruit of a labour started in 1883. The author then lengthened and amended it three times, the last two shortly before its publication.

== Analysis ==
The first three stanzas present the city protected by the mountain of Montjuïc, identified with Alcides (Hercules), the mythic founder of Barcino according to a legend that Verdaguer had already picked up on in The Atlàntida (1878).

Next are sixteen quatrains, in which the poet celebrates the demolition of the walls and the extension of the city (1859), with a prophecy of bursting growth, beyond the Collserola mountain range and the Besos and Llobregat rivers, as if "Paris of the Seine" had been transplanted to Catalonia.

However, the three following stanzas, in the name of the homeland, reject any awe of the French capital, affirming instead the personality of Barcelona, which had been the Catalan center of a medieval Mediterranean empire and «She shone on Spanish lands as eastern star».

In the 23rd to 40th stanzas, the poet evokes the historical characters and the monuments that distinguish the city.

The six final stanzas, written from the perspective of the Cathedral, imaginatively transfigured into King Jaume I, formulate the ideological conclusion, the providential perspective, in which Barcelona and Catalonia are exhorted to promote economic progress, based on their industries, but without ever renouncing the Catholic tradition, since in the end «God alone brings down or lifts up peoples».

== Reception ==
In spite of the rhetorical flourishes denounced by some critics, the poem, rewarded with an extraordinary prize in the Floral Games (Jocs florals) of 1883, expresses faithfully the expectations of the elite of the period. This is confirmed by the fact that the Ajuntament (city council) published a popular edition of the poem, with a print run of 100,000 copies.

On the other hand, the poem has also provoked numerous imitations and responses, noteworthy of which are the "New Ode to Barcelona" by Joan Maragall and the "Ode to Barcelona" by Pere Quart.

The full, annotated text of the poem is included in Selected Poems of Jacint Verdaguer: A Bilingual Edition, edited and translated by Ronald Puppo, with an introduction by Ramon Pinyol

== See also ==
- "Oda nova a Barcelona", by Joan Maragall
