= Antonio López, 1st Marquess of Comillas =

Spanish businessman (1817–1883)

The Most Excellent The Marquess of Comillas GE
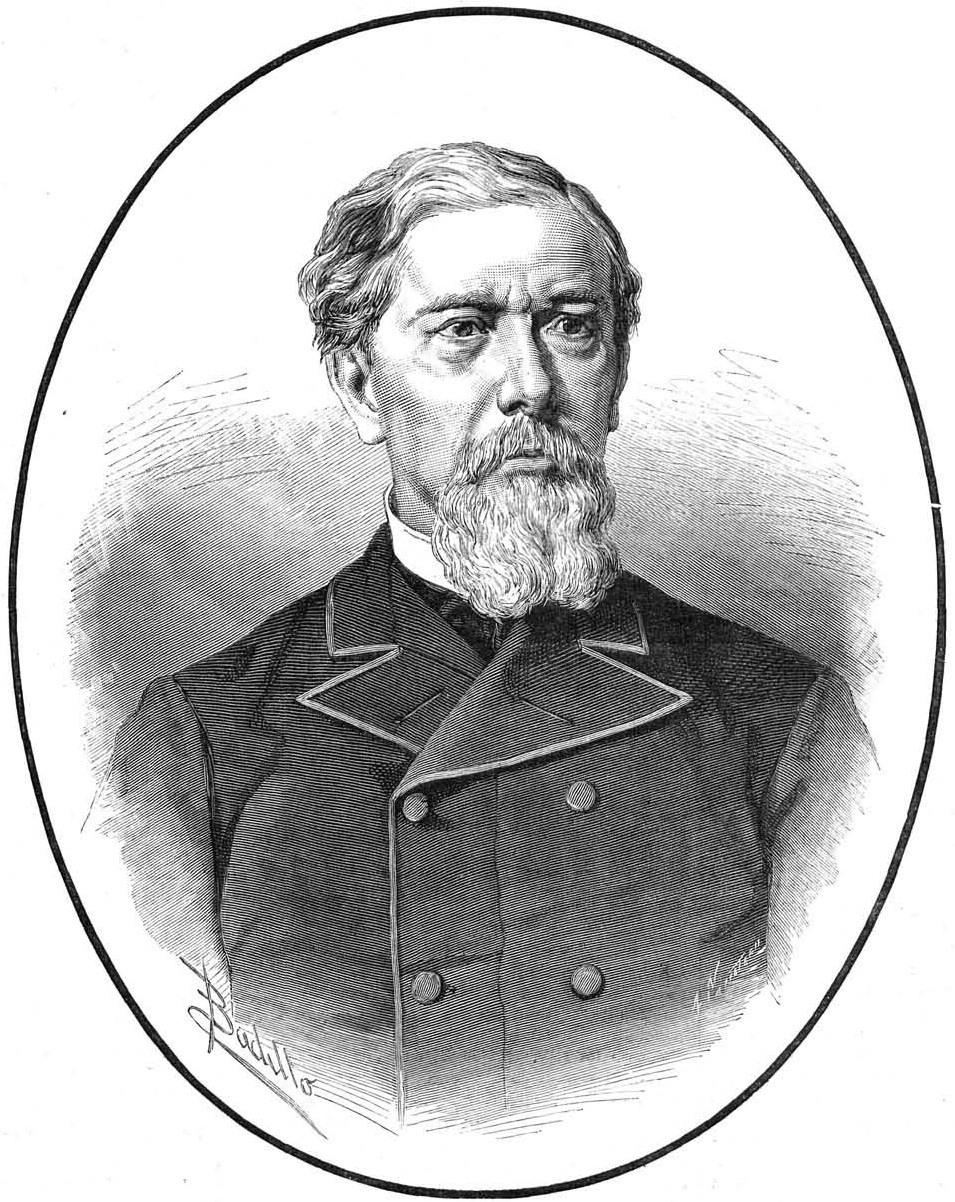
- Litography of the Marquess of Comillas, 1883

Personal details
- Born: April 12, 1817 Comillas, Spain
- Died: January 16, 1883 (aged 65) Barcelona, Spain
- Spouse: Lluïsa Bru Lassús
- Children: Four

Antonio López y López, 1st Marquess of Comillas, GE (1817–1883) was a Spanish businessman, slave trader and shipping magnate. He was the founder of several important companies and one of the world's wealthiest individuals in the second half of the nineteenth century.

After his death, his son Claudio López Bru took over the responsibility of running the companies his father had founded.

== Biography ==
Antonio López emigrated to colonial Cuba in 1831 while still a teenager and lived in Santiago de Cuba. He took an interest in shipping and in 1850 he founded the "Compañia de Vapores Correos A. López" which began operations with a 400-ton hybrid sailing ship-sidewheel steamer. This company would eventually become the Compañía Transatlántica Española ocean line in 1881. In Cuba, he was involved in trading slaves, purchasing enslaved Africans who had been illegally landed on Cuba's eastern coast and selling them in several Cuban cities.

In 1876 he became the co-founder and first president of the Banco Hispano Colonial, established in Barcelona. He also led the Banco de Crédito Mercantil. Around that time Antonio López moved to Barcelona and married a Catalan lady, Luisa Bru Lassús, with whom he had four children. Claudio López Bru was his fourth son. During this decade he moved the head offices of some of his companies to Spain as well. Eventually his children became part of the high society in Barcelona and Antonio López became the father-in-law of Eusebi Güell after his daughter Isabel López Bru married him.

At the prompting of Jesuit Tomás Gómez Carral Antonio López agreed to finance the construction of the Comillas Pontifical University, but he died in 1883 in Barcelona in the very year of the groundbreaking ceremony.

== Legacy and honors ==
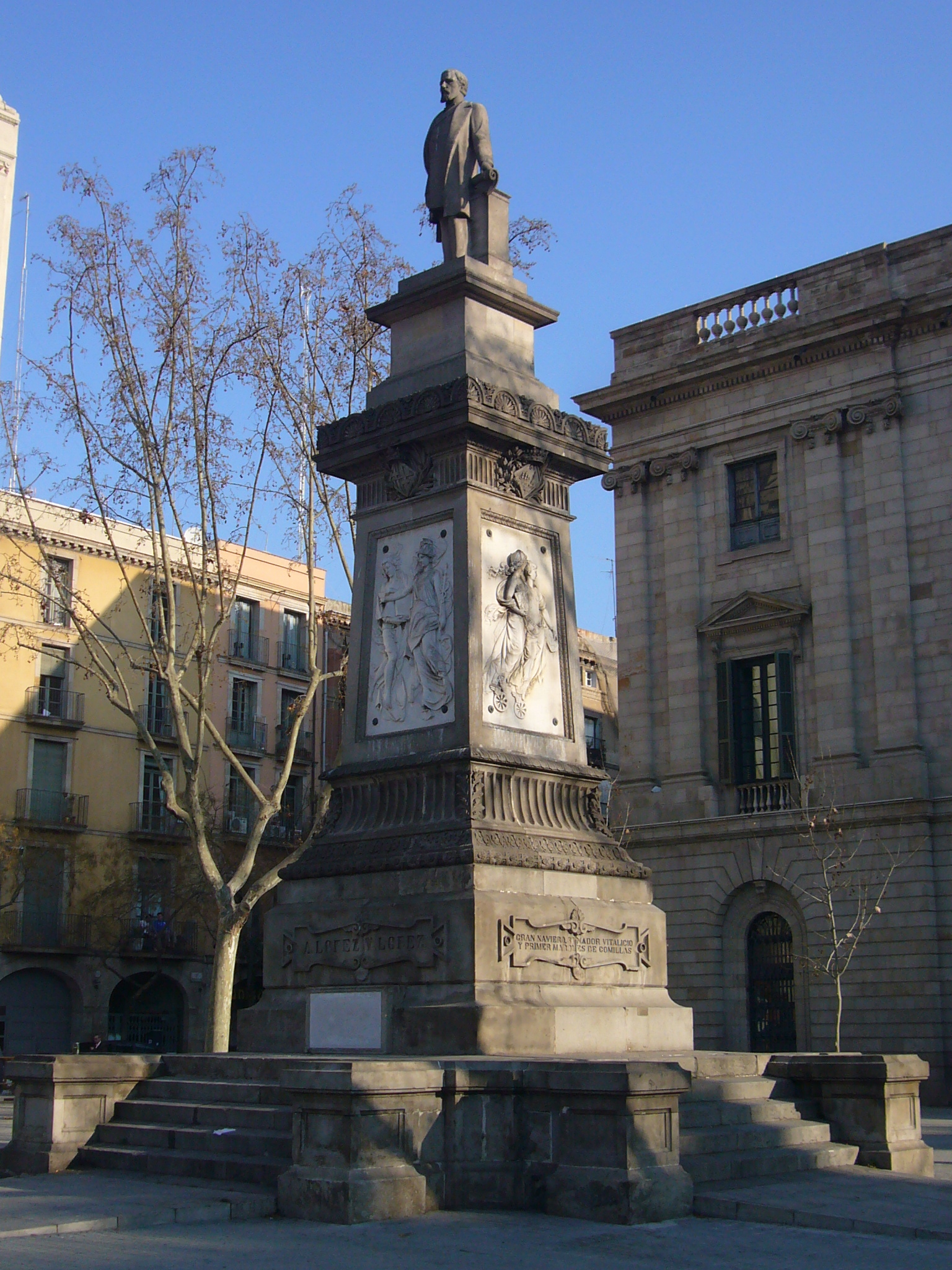
Monument to the Marquess of Comillas in Barcelona, Spain

Antonio López was the founder of the following companies: Compañía General de Tabacos de Filipinas, Compañía de los Caminos de Hierro del Norte de España, and Compañía Transatlántica Española, among others.

In 1877 writer Jacint Verdaguer wrote the Catalan language poem L'Atlàntida in his honour.

He was ennobled with the title of Marquess of Comillas in 1878 and was also awarded the Order of Isabella the Catholic. King Alfonso XII made a eulogy of Antonio López following his death, saying that "Spain has lost one of the men who has given it the greatest service."

In Barcelona, there was formerly a monument dedicated to him and the companies he founded. Located close to the Compañía Transatlántica Española head office, the monument A López y López was erected in 1884 and was designed by architect Josep Oriol Mestres and sculptor Venanci Vallmitjana. On its sides it has reliefs by Lluís Puiggener, Joan Roig i Solé, Rossend Nobas and Francesc Pagès. The monument was destroyed in 1936, but was restored in 1944 by Frederic Marès. On March 4, 2018 the monument was finally removed after a campaign denouncing the involvement of Antonio López in the slave trade.

== Arms ==
Heraldry of Antonio López, 1st Marquess of Comillas

Coat of Arms as Marquess of Comillas
(1878–1883)

== See also ==
- Antonio López (shipwreck)
- Palacio de Sobrellano

== Bibliography ==
- Faes Díaz, Enrique (2009). Claudio López Bru, Marqués de Comillas. Ediciones de Historia (in Spanish). Madrid: Marcial Pons. ISBN 978-84-92820-06-1.
- McDonogh, Gary Wray (2014). Good Families of Barcelona. A Social History of Power in the Industrial Era. Princeton University Press. ISBN 978-1-4008-5823-1.

Spanish nobility
Preceded by New creation	Marquess of Comillas; 1878–1883	Succeeded by Claudio López
