= Compañía General de Tabacos de Filipinas v. Collector of Internal Revenue =

- Court: US Supreme Court
- Decided: 21 November 1927
- Citation: 275 US 87 (1927)

Keywords
- Preemption

Compañía General de Tabacos de Filipinas v. Collector of Internal Revenue, 275 US 87 (1927) is a US tax law case during the Lochner era of the US Supreme Court.

== Facts ==
A Spanish corporation, Compañía General de Tabacos de Filipinas, claimed that a tax on goods it shipped was unlawfully imposed by the Collector of Internal Revenue. The company bought goods, stored them in a Philippine warehouse, and notified the value to its Barcelona head office, which insured them through a company in London. The company claimed a tax statute of the Philippines was contrary to the Act of Congress of August 29, 1916, c. 416, § 3 (the Jones Act), 39 Stat. 545, 546, 547, as depriving it of its property without due process of law, and also as departing from the requirement in the same section that the rules of taxation shall be uniform.

The Supreme Court of the Philippines upheld the tax.

== Judgment ==
The US Supreme Court held that the tax was lawful.

Holmes J dissented on reasoning, not result, joined by Brandeis J.

The plaintiff's reliance is upon Allgeyer v. Louisiana, 165 U. S. 578, 17 S. Ct. 427, 41 L. Ed. 832, in which it was held that a fine could not be imposed by the State for sending a notice similar to the present to an insurance company out of the State. But it seems to me that the tax was justified and that this case is distinguished from that of Allgeyer and from St. Louis Cotton Compress Co. v. Arkansas, 260 U.S. 346, 43 S. Ct. 125, 67 L. Ed. 297, by the difference between a penalty and a tax. It is true, as indicated in the last cited case, that every exaction of money for an act is a discouragement to the extent of the payment required, but that which in its immediacy is a discouragement may be part of an encouragement when seen in its organic connection with the whole. Taxes are what we pay for civilized society, including the chance to insure. A penalty on the other hand is intended altogether to prevent the thing punished. It readily may be seen that a State may tax things that under the Constitution as interpreted it can not prevent. The constitutional right asserted in Allgeyer v. Louisiana to earn one's livelihood by any lawful calling certainly is consistent, as we all know, with the calling being taxed. Sometimes there may be a difficulty in deciding whether an imposition is a tax or a penalty, but generally the intent to prohibit when it exists is plainly expressed. Sometimes even when it is called a tax the requirement is shown to be a penalty by its excess in amount over the tax in similar cases, as in St. Louis Cotton Compress Co. v. Arkansas. But in the present instance there is no room for doubt. The charge not only is called a tax but is the same in amount as that imposed where the right to impose it is not denied.

== See also ==
- United States tax law
