= Vil·la Joana =

Building in Barcelona, Spain

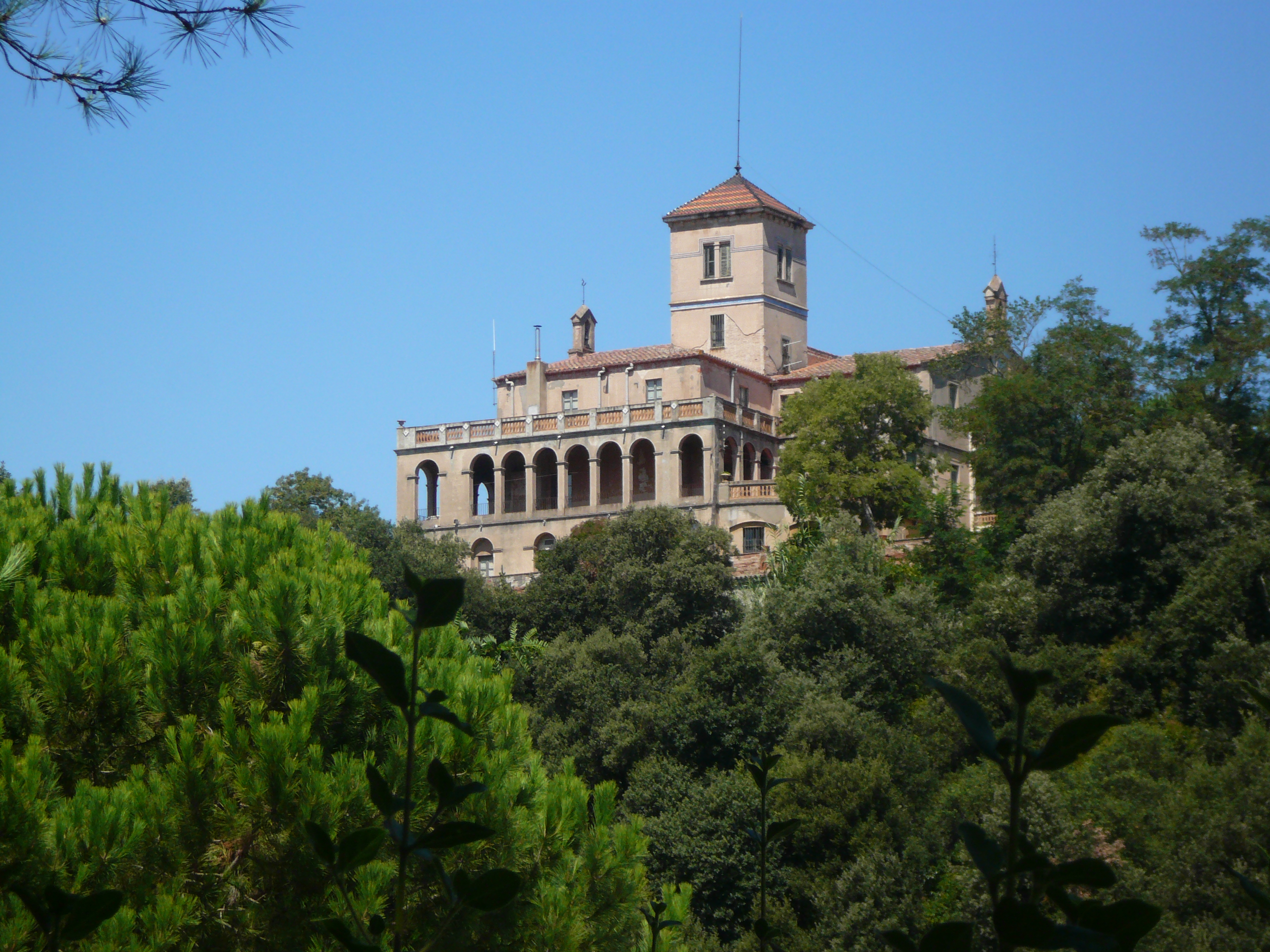
Vil·la Joana

Viŀla Joana is a masia located in Vallvidrera (Sarrià-Sant Gervasi district, Barcelona) in the middle of Collserola Natural Park. It is a two storey building with a watchtower and lateral galleries. One of its most distinctive elements is the clock on the main façade.

Today, Viŀla Joana houses one of the branches of the Barcelona City History Museum (MUHBA), which updated the collection on display here in 2016. The museum deals with the history of the site, literature, and the Catalan poet Jacint Verdaguer, who died here in 1902.

== History ==
Viŀla Joana was one of the most important masies of Vallvidrera. Documented since the 16th century, it became a property of the Miralles family in the 19th century. Then, it took the current name of Viŀla Joana, which symbolizes the transformation of the old farmhouse into a residential villa. In 1902, the prominent poet Jacint Verdaguer was hosted by the Miralles family, and he died here after a short stay.

Beginning in 1920, the Viŀla Joana hosted the “Vilajoana School”, a special school whose staff included several prominent faculty, including Jesús María Bellido, Joan Alzina i Melis, Pere Barnils i Giol, and Joan Llongueres.

The school remained at Viŀla Joana until 1973, when it moved into a new building in the nearby area.

In the meantime, the Barcelona City Government decided to transform Viŀla Joana into a museum dedicated to Jacint Verdaguer and linked it to the Barcelona City History Museum network.

Between 2014 and 2016 the house was completely refurbished and its historical contents updated. Currently, MUHBA Viŀla Joana exhibits objects related to the history of the house itself, the pedagogical task of the special school, Barcelona as a literary city, and especially to Jacint Verdaguer.
