= Folgueroles =

- Municipality
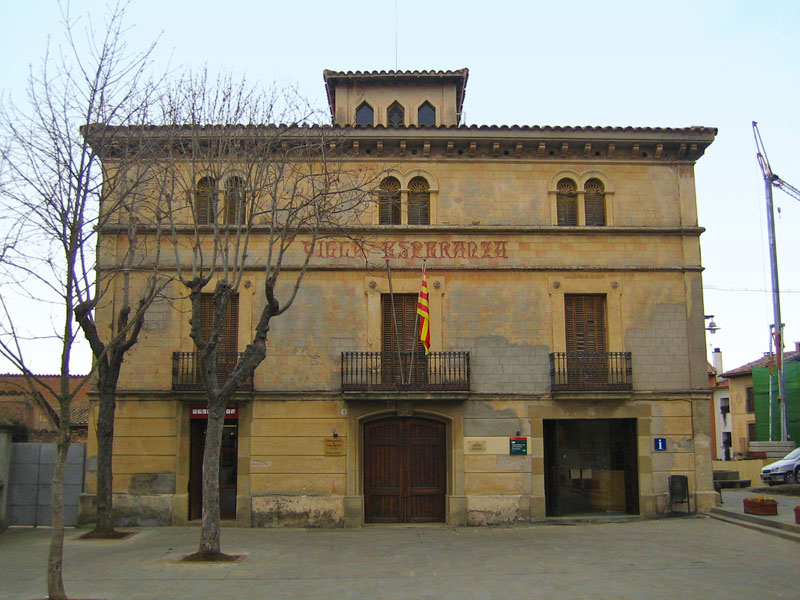
- Town hall

- Coat of arms

- Location in Catalonia Folgueroles (Spain)
- Coordinates: 41°56′34″N 2°18′52″E
- Country: Spain
- Community: Catalonia
- Province: Barcelona
- Comarca: Osona

Government
  - Mayor: Carles Baronet Aldabó (2015)

Area
  - Total: 10.5 km^{2} (4.1 sq mi)

Population (2025-01-01)
  - Total: 2,262
  - Density: 215/km^{2} (558/sq mi)
- Website: www.folgueroles.cat

Folgueroles (Catalan pronunciation: [fulɣəˈɾɔləs]) is a municipality in the comarca of Osona in the province of Barcelona, Spain. It was the birthplace in 1845 of the famous Catalan poet Fr. Jacint Verdaguer.

== Notable people ==
- Anna Dodas i Noguer (1962—1986), poet
