= Brissac =

- Commune
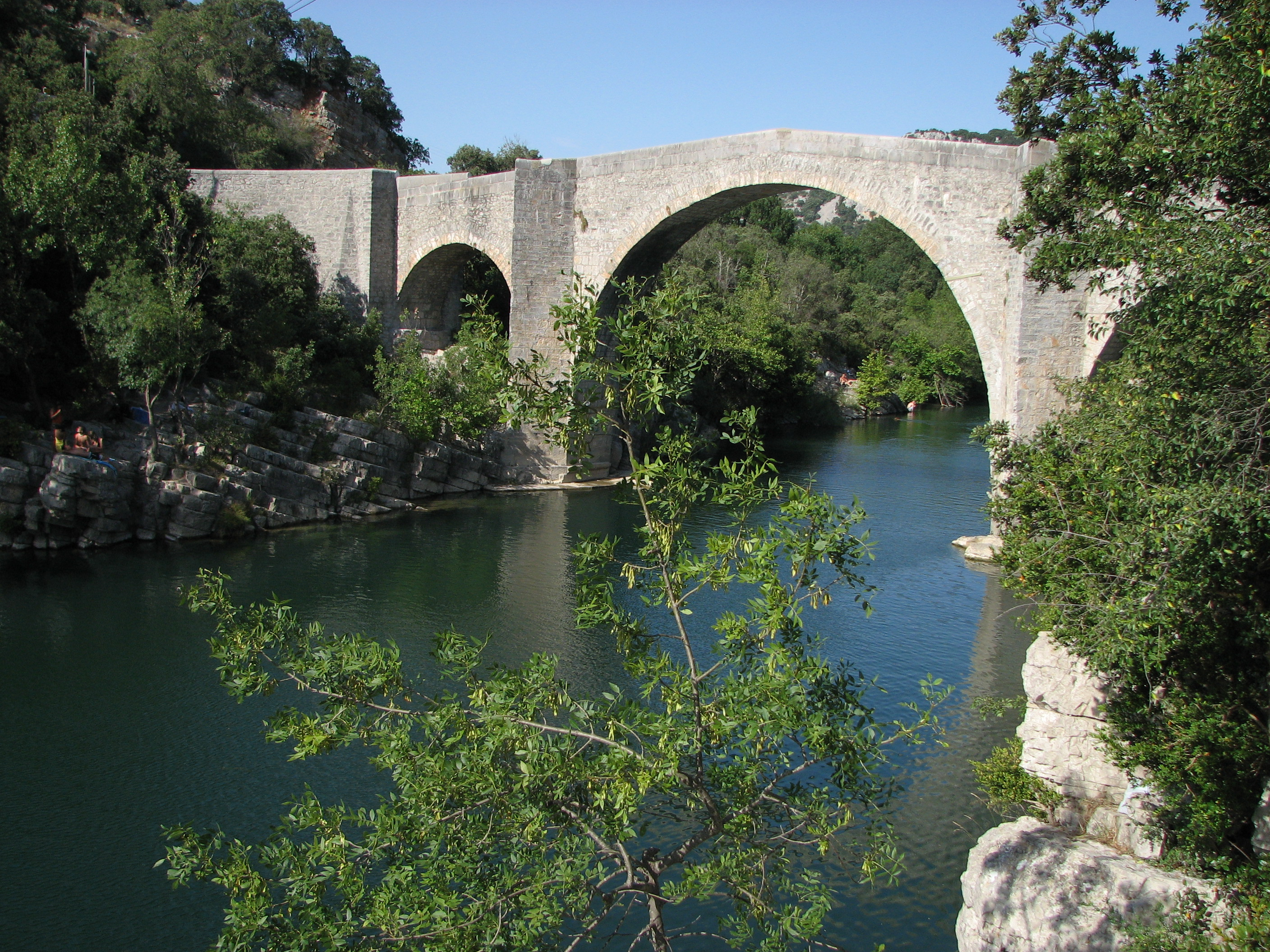
- The St-Étienne d'Issensac Bridge

- Coat of arms
- Location of Brissac
- Location within France Location within Occitanie
- Coordinates: 43°52′47″N 3°42′09″E
- Country: France
- Region: Occitania
- Department: Hérault
- Arrondissement: Lodève
- Canton: Lodève
- Intercommunality: Cévennes Gangeoises et Suménoises

Government
  - Mayor (2025–2026): Françoise Copin
- Area^{1}: 44.13 km^{2} (17.04 sq mi)
- Elevation: 145 m (476 ft)
- Highest elevation: 772 m (2,533 ft)
- Lowest elevation: 99 m (325 ft)
- Population (2023): 615
  - Density: 13.9/km^{2} (36.1/sq mi)
- Time zone: UTC+01:00 (CET)
  - Summer (DST): UTC+02:00 (CEST)
- INSEE/Postal code: 34042 /34190
- ^{1} French Land Register data, which excludes lakes, ponds, glaciers > 1 km^{2} (0.386 sq mi or 247 acres) and river estuaries.

Brissac (French pronunciation: [bʁisak]; Languedocien: Briçac) is a commune in the Hérault department in southern France.

== Population ==
Historical population
Year	Pop.	±% p.a.
1968	370	—
1975	305	−2.72%
1982	285	−0.96%
1990	365	+3.14%
1999	442	+2.15%
2007	603	+3.96%
2012	619	+0.53%
2017	613	−0.19%
2023	615	+0.05%
Source: INSEE

== Sights ==
- Castle (11th century), rebuilt in the early 16th century.
- Parish church of Saint-Nazaire et Saint-Celse (12th century)
- Church of Notre-Dame du Suc
- Chapel of Saint-Etienne d'Issensac. Nearby is the medieval Bridge of Saint-Étienne d'Issensac (14th century).

== See also ==
- Communes of the Hérault department
