= George Rabasa =

American novelist

- Born: George Anthony Rabasa; December 29, 1941 (age 84); Biddeford, Maine, U.S.
- Occupations: Writer; author

George Anthony Rabasa (/rəˈbɑːsə/; born December 29, 1941) is an American writer and author of four novels and a short story collection. Rabasa has received such honors as The Loft Career Initiative Grant, The Writer's Voice Capricorn Award, and two Minnesota Book Awards.

== Background ==
Rabasa was born December 29, 1941, in Biddeford, Maine, to Catalan refugees. He was raised in Mexico City.

He currently lives in the state of Minnesota.

== Partial bibliography ==
=== Novels ===
- The Wonder Singer (Unbridled Books, 2008)
- The Cleansing (The Permanent Press, 2006)
- Floating Kingdom (Coffee House Press, 1997)

=== Short stories ===
- Glass Houses (Coffee House Press, 1996).

=== Anthologies ===
- “Family Lines”, A Ghost at Heart's Edge, North Atlantic Books, 1999.
- “Jimmy Pearl's Blue Oyster”, 26 Minnesota Writers, Nodin Press, 1995.

=== Journals ===
- “Yolanda by Day”, American Literary Review, 2003.
- “Fallen Coconuts and Dead Fish”, Green Hills, 2003.
- “Ask Señor Totol”, Hayden’s Ferry Review, 2002–2003.
- “Hay Soos Saves”, North Dakota Quarterly, 2002.
- “For the Solitary Soul”, South Carolina Review, 2001.
- “Three Incidents in the Early Life of El Perro”, Atlanta Review, 2001.
- “The Beautiful Wife”, Glimmer Train Stories, 1995.

== Awards ==
- The Loft Literary Center Career Initiative Grant, 2008
- A BookSense Notable Book Selection, The Cleansing, 2006
- Minnesota State Arts Board, Artist Fellowship, 2001
- Minnesota Book Award for Novel, Floating Kingdom, 1998
- Minnesota Book Award for Short Fiction, Glass Houses, 1997
- The Writers Voice Capricorn Award, Excellence in Fiction, 1992
