= Sant Julià de Cerdanyola =

- Municipality
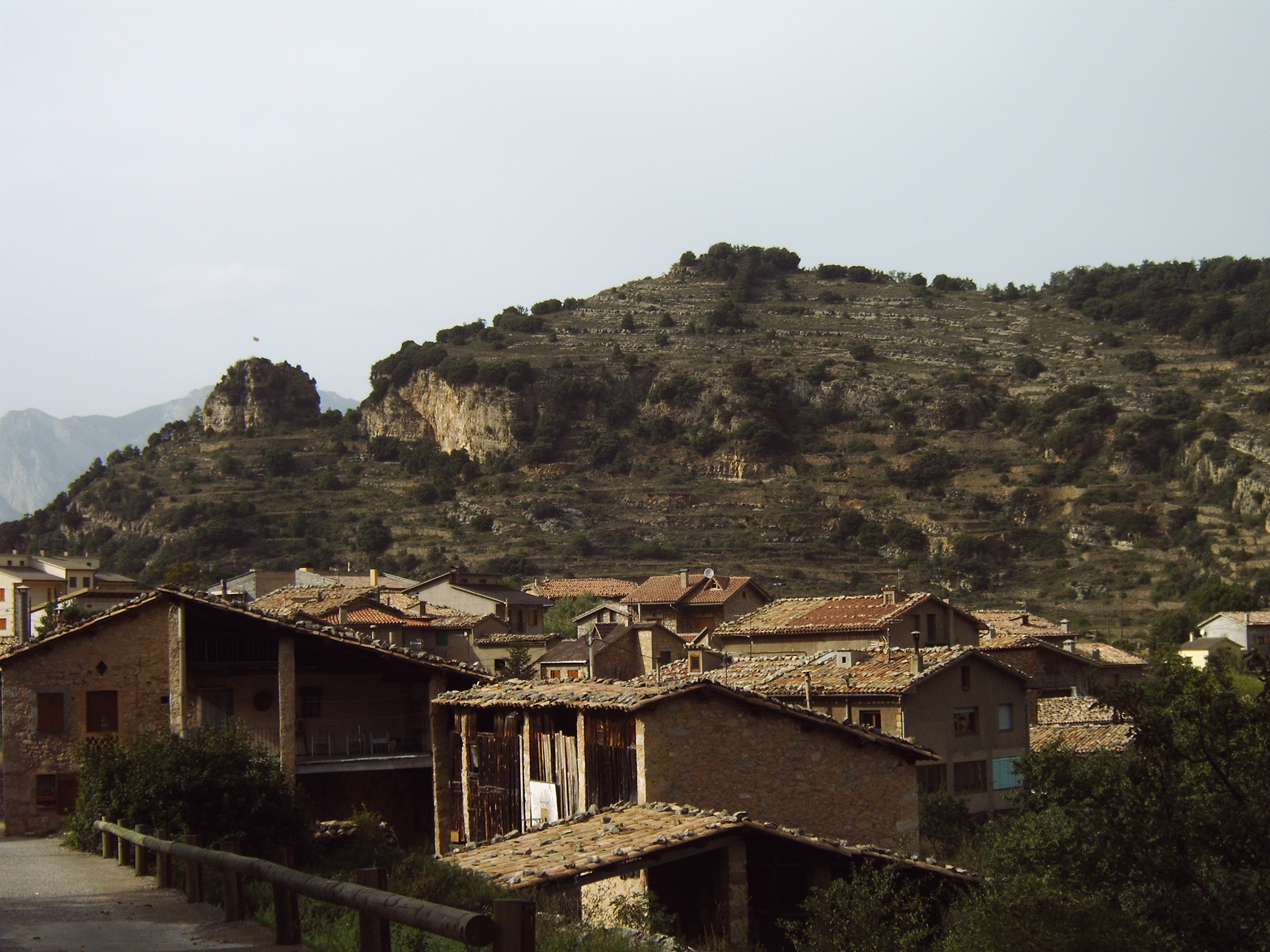
- View of the town

- Flag Coat of arms

- Location in Catalonia Sant Julià de Cerdanyola (Spain)
- Coordinates: 42°13′32″N 1°53′38″E
- Country: Spain
- Community: Catalonia
- Province: Barcelona
- Comarca: Berguedà

Government
  - Mayor: Agustí Elias Cunill (2015) (Cerdanyola-AM)

Area
  - Total: 11.8 km^{2} (4.6 sq mi)
- Elevation: 650 m (2,130 ft)

Population (2025-01-01)
  - Total: 234
  - Density: 19.8/km^{2} (51.4/sq mi)
- Demonym(s): Cerdanyolenc, cerdanyolenca
- Website: www.santjuliadecerdanyola.cat

Sant Julià de Cerdanyola (Catalan pronunciation: [ˈsaɲ ʒuliˈa ðə səɾðəˈɲɔlə]) is a town and municipality in the comarca of Berguedà, in Catalonia.

== Geography ==
The town is located in a high hollow in the Pyrenees of Berguedà, at 1000 meters above sea level. The main access road to the town is a steep, winding highway coming from the town of Guardiola de Berguedà, in the Valley of the Llobregat below.

== Celebrations ==
The town festival is celebrated on 5 December. On Christmas Eve, the inhabitants of the town also celebrate the Fia-Faia, a pre-Christian commemoration of the solstice where bundles of Cephalaria leucanta, called faies, are brought from a bonfire outside town to Plaça de l'església in the center of the village.
