= Francesc Burgos =

American artist of Catalan origin

Francesc Burgos is an American artist of Catalan origin. Burgos creates mostly ceramic sculptures and has prior experience with architecture, as well as product, graphic and textile design. Burgos has exhibited in a number of venues including galleries in Ann Arbor, Salt Lake City, and New York City, as well as one of Ann Arbor's public libraries. He is a member of the WSG Gallery collective in Ann Arbor.
