= L'Atlàntida =

L'Atlàntida (Catalan pronunciation: [ləˈlːantiðə]) is an 1877 epic poem in Catalan by Jacint Verdaguer. It consists of an introduction, ten books, and a conclusion, dealing with the wanderings of Heracles in the Iberian Peninsula, the sinking of the continent of Atlantis, the creation of the Mediterranean Sea, and the discovery of the Americas.

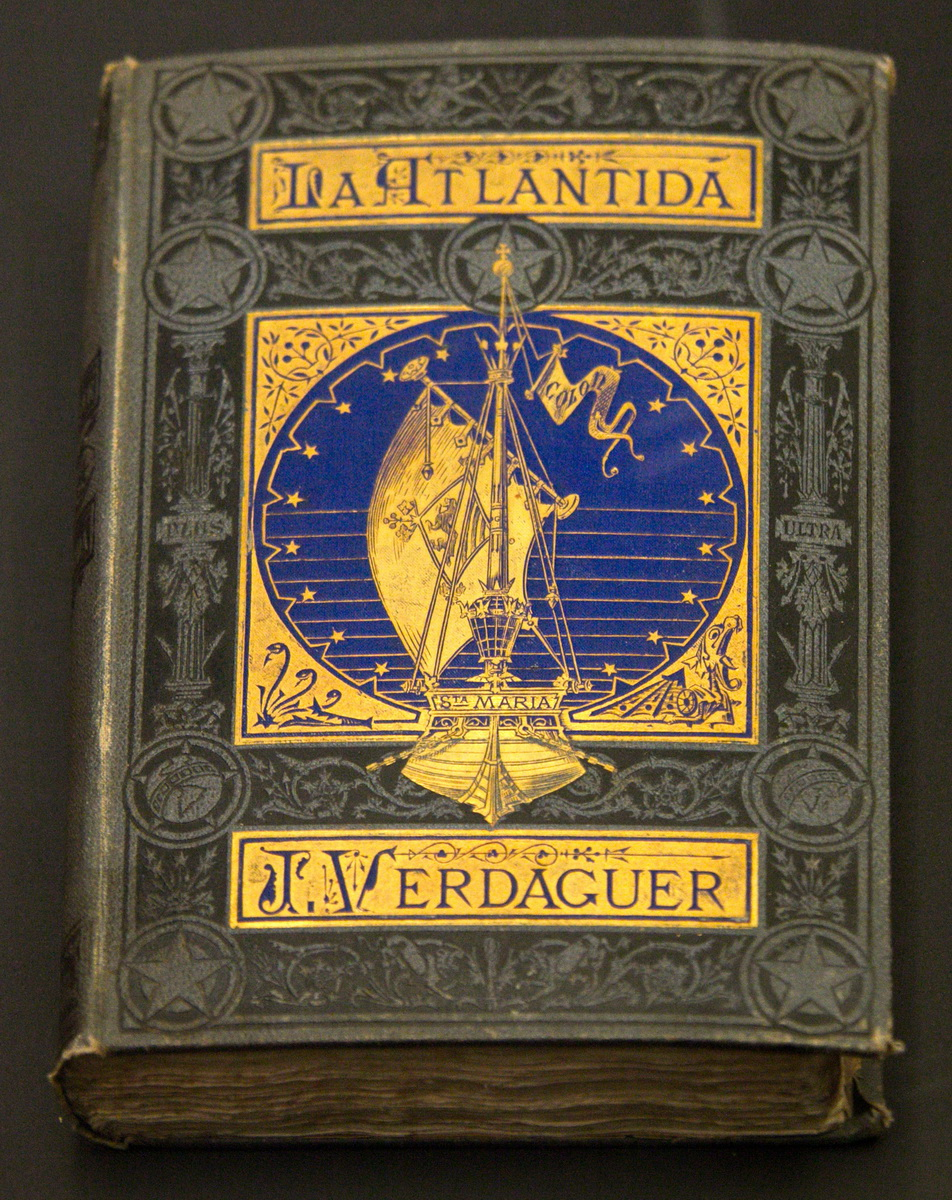
L'Atlàntida

This poem was written by Verdaguer in honour of shipping magnate Antonio López y López, first Marquis of Comillas.

The full verse translation into English was published in 2024.

Manuel de Falla's opera Atlántida is based on this poem.
