= Summer solstice fire festivals in the Pyrenees =

Annual midsummer tradition

- UNESCO Intangible Cultural Heritage
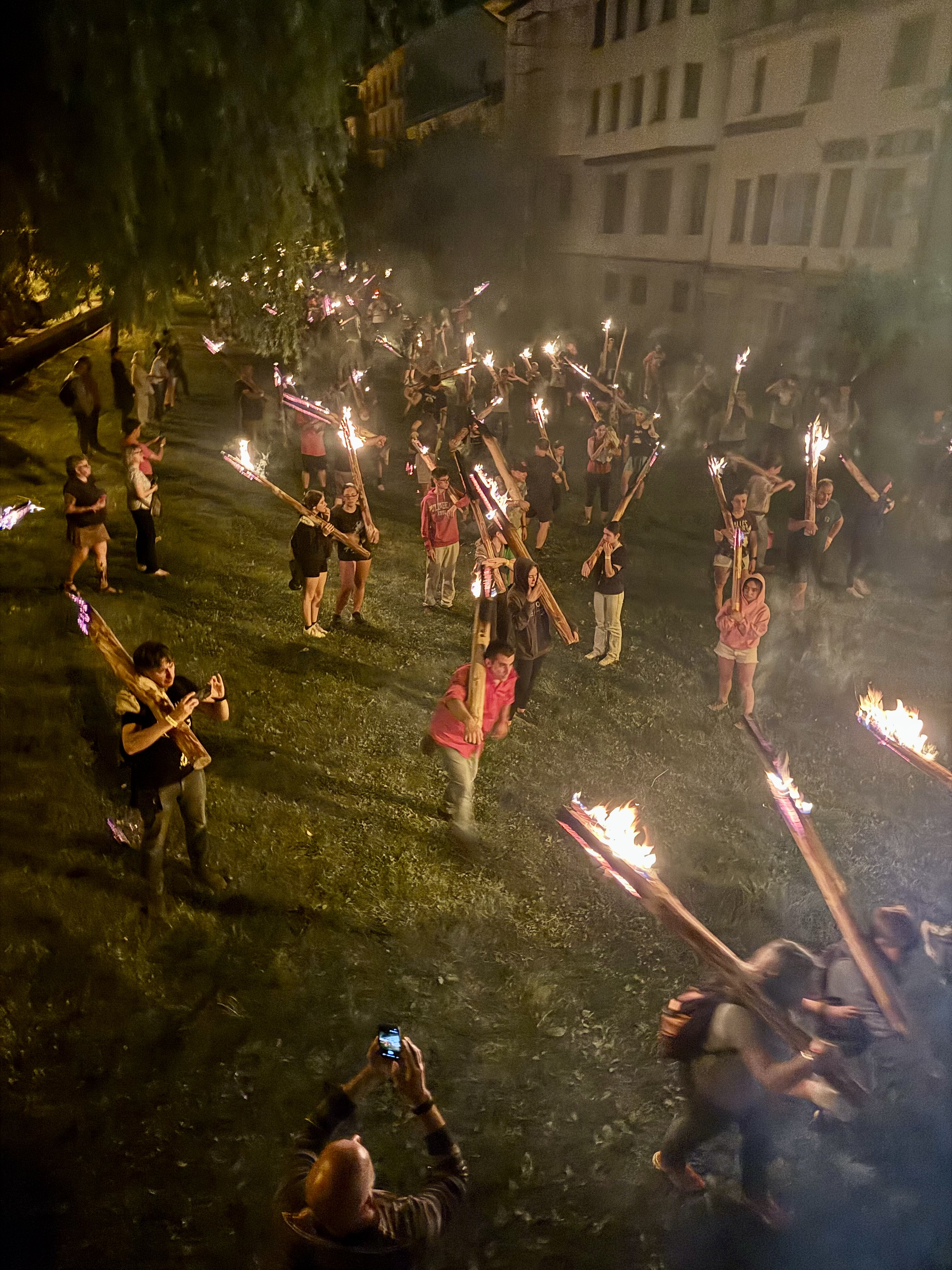
- Falles in Sort in 2026
- Country: Andorra, France and Spain
- Reference: 01073
- Region: Europe and North America

Inscription history
- Inscription: 2015 (10th session)
- List: Representative

The Summer solstice fire festivals in the Pyrenees are a set of traditional midsummer celebrations held in villages and towns in the Pyrenees in Andorra, France, and Spain. They are usually celebrated between mid-June and mid-July, but specially on the night of 23 June, with rituals centered around fire.

On 1 December 2015, UNESCO included the tradition on its Representative List of the Intangible Cultural Heritage of Humanity.

== Description ==
The festivals vary from town to town, depending on the traditions of each village. The participants descend from a high point on the mountains carrying home-made torches, drawing shapes in the air with fire, dancing, or lighting a large bonfire. Usually, some of these items are combined, and they are mixed with other celebrations such as popular folklore and communal dining.

The main night of celebration is 23 June, the eve of Saint John's Day, but the date varies from mid-June to late July. Two villages, Bagà and Sant Julià de Cerdanyola, celebrate this tradition on the winter solstice, specifically on Christmas Eve.

Days or weeks before the night of the celebration, the villagers use traditional skills and tools to build the torches, whose names vary depending on the town, the area and the local language: for instance, falles in Catalan and Aragonese, haro or faro in Aranese, or brandons in French and Occitan.

When night falls, every community begins the ritual: from the highest point of the mountains or a higher village, participants walk or run down the mountains with flaming torches. They carry them in a snake-like line down to the village square where they pile them up into a single bonfire. In other places, such as Les and Arties in Val d'Aran, a large tree is dragged down the village streets while burning.

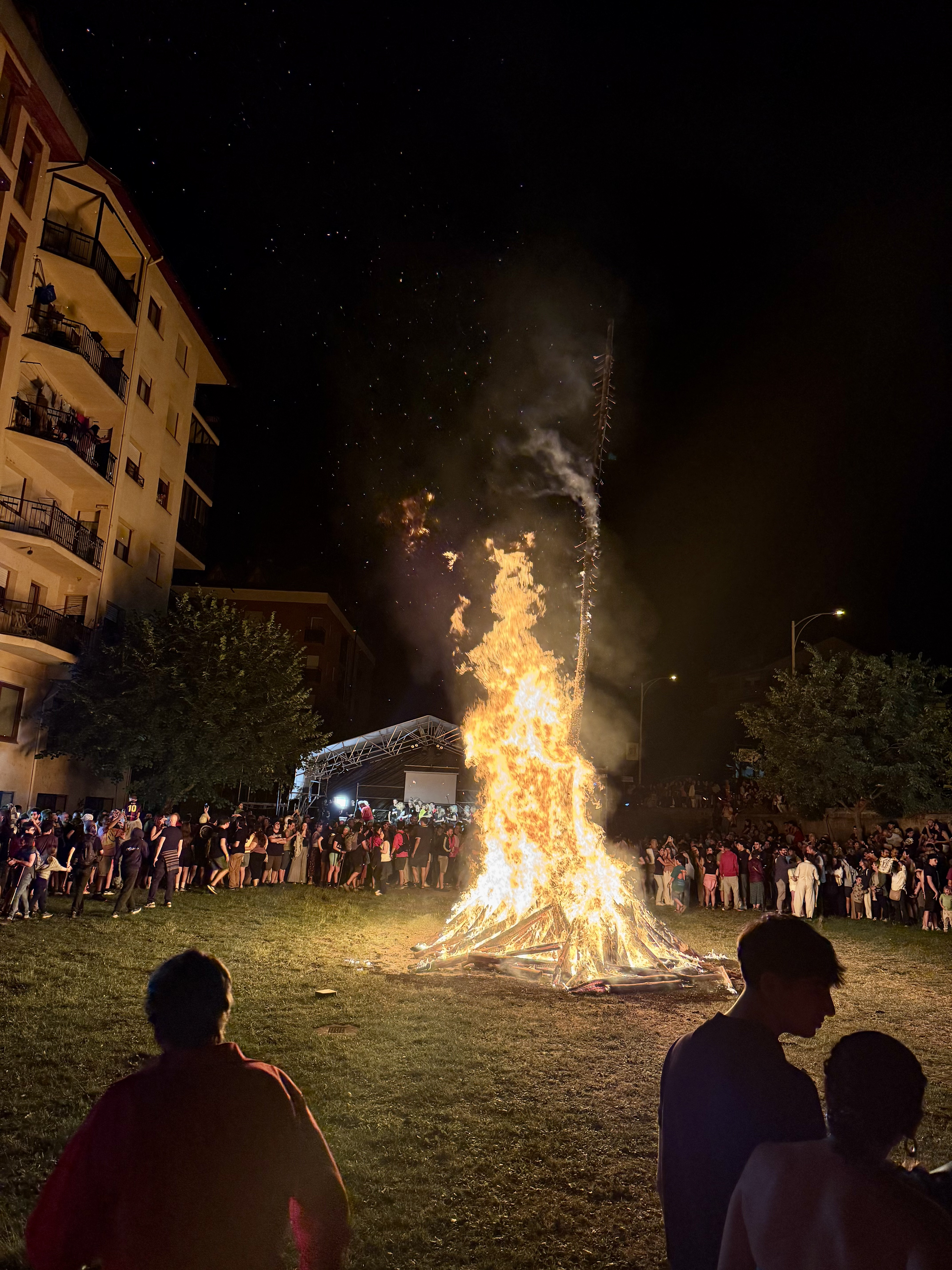
Bonfire at the end of the baixada de falles in Sort in 2026.

The flames are considered to purify, invigorate and fertilise goodness across the mountains, fields, villages and populations. In the morning people collect embers or ashes to protect their homes or gardens. The rituals also serve as opportunities to build community, pass down knowledge from one generation to the next, and honor neighbors and loved ones who have passed away.

== Villages ==
In 2015, the nomination form to the UNESCO mentioned 63 villages where the tradition was kept alive: 34 in France, 26 in Spain and 3 in Andorra, with a total population of more than 65.000 people.

Since 2015, the designation as Intangible Cultural Heritage of Humanity has sparked renewed interest in this tradition across much of the Pyrenees, and it is now celebrated in 94 towns.

Several towns where the tradition had been lost have revived their festivals. For example, Ordino and La Massana in Andorra, or Sort and Alàs i Cerc, in Catalonia. Other places have joined the festival despite having no previously documented tradition, such as Llavorsí.
