= Jacint Verdaguer =

Catalan writer & poet (1845–1902)

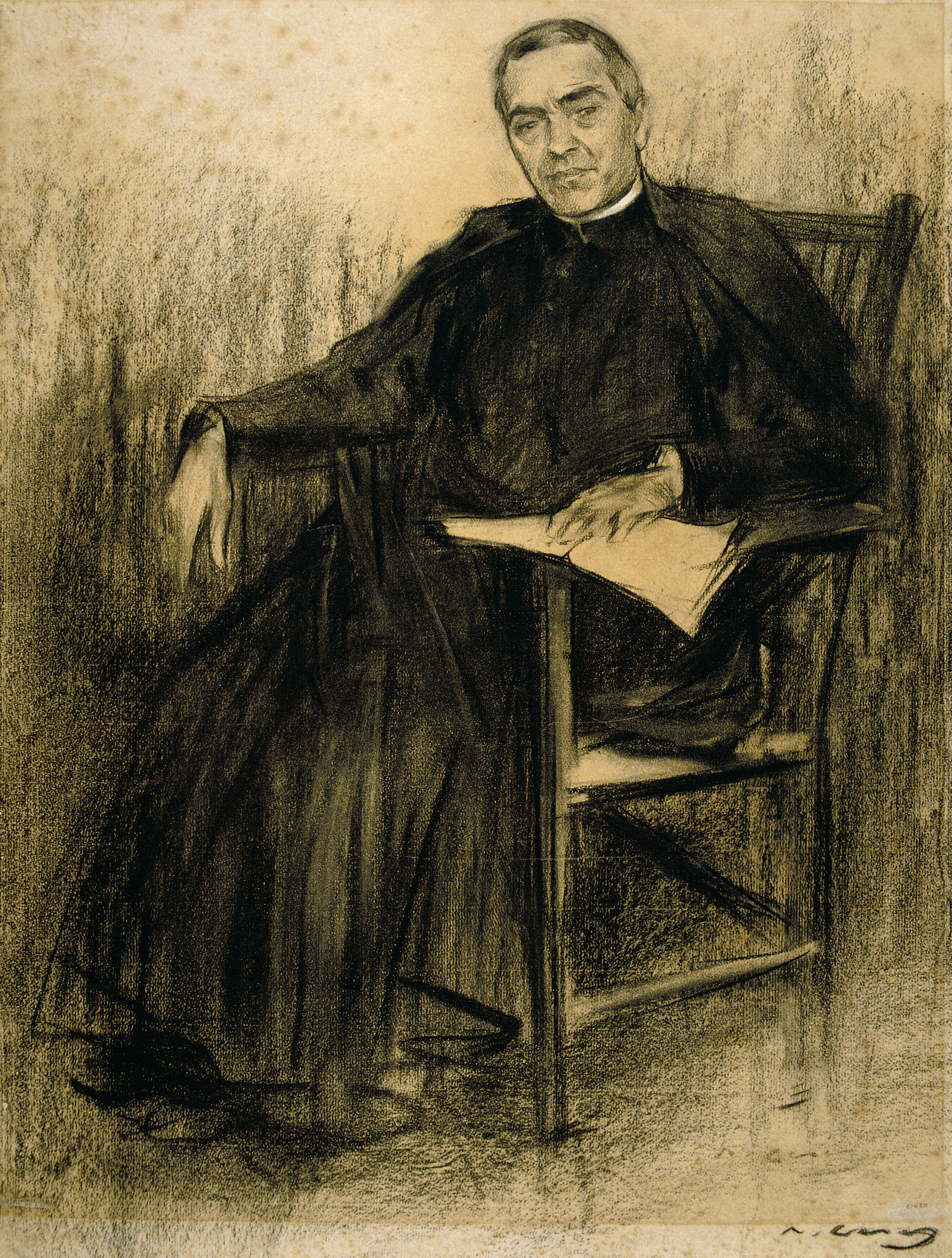
- Verdaguer as seen by Ramon Casas in 1901 (MNAC)
- Born: 17 May 1845; Folgueroles, Barcelona, Spain
- Died: 10 June 1902 (aged 57); Vallvidrera, Barcelona, Spain
- Occupations: Poet, priest
- Writing career
- Notable works: Canigó, L'Atlàntida
- Movements: Renaixença, Romanticism

Signature
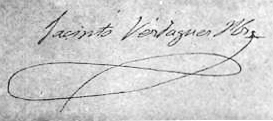

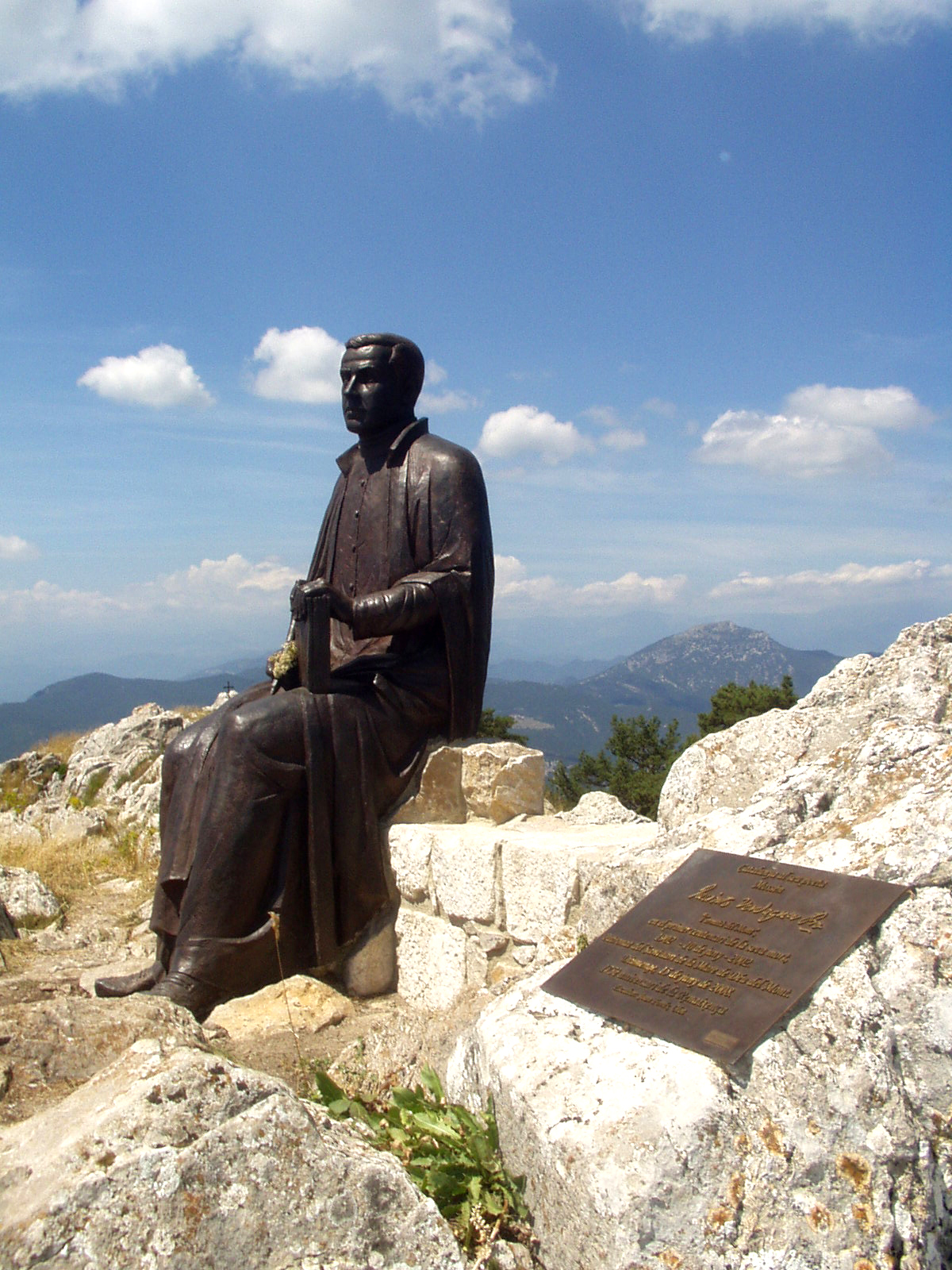
Statue in honor of the poet atop the Mare de Déu del Mont peak.

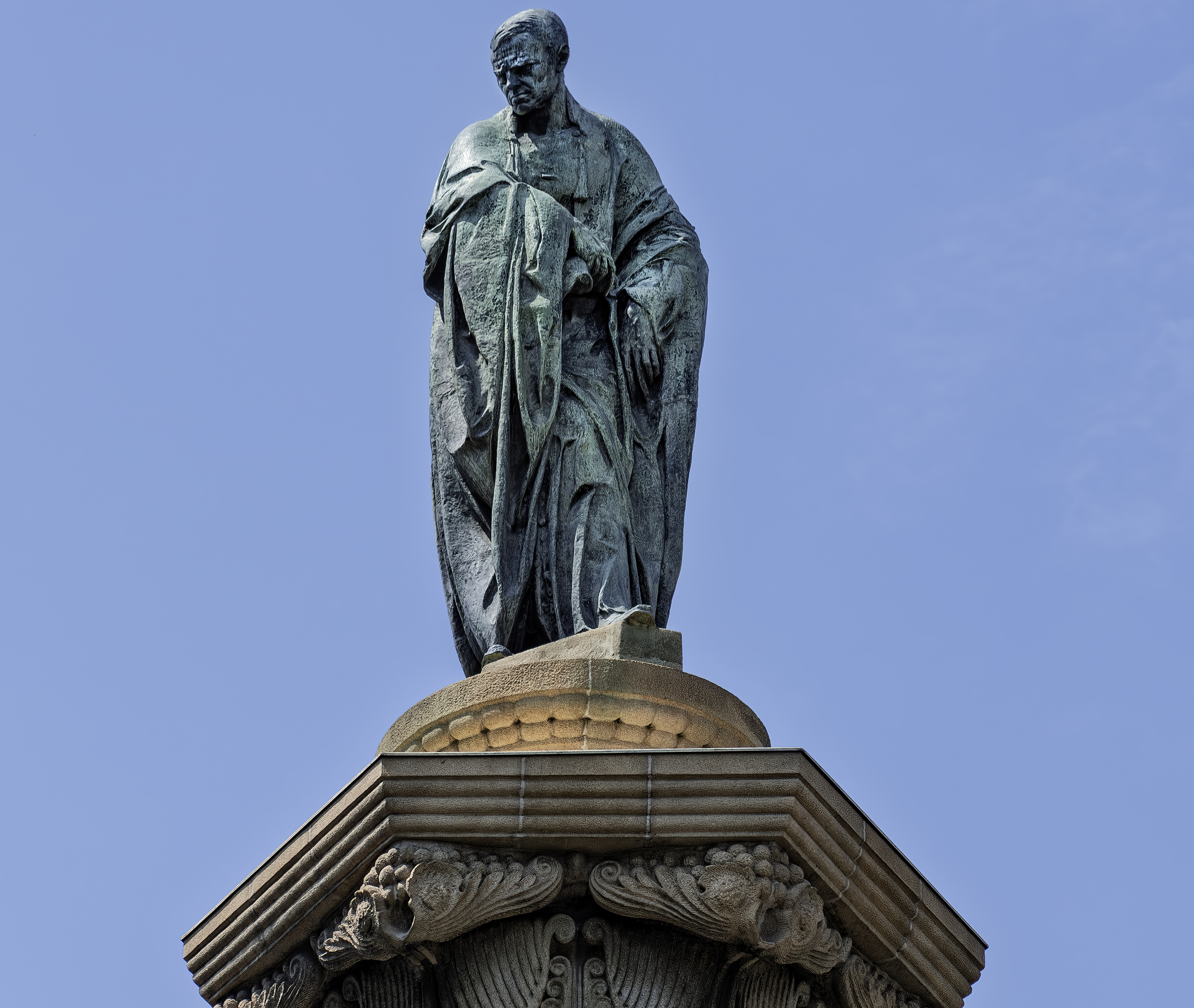
Sculpture of Jacint Verdaguer by Joan Borrell i Nicolau in Barcelona

Jacint Verdaguer i Santaló (Catalan pronunciation: [ʒəˈsim bərdəˈɣej səntəl'o]; 17 May 1845 – 10 June 1902) was a Spanish writer and priest, regarded as one of the greatest poets of Catalan literature and a prominent literary figure of the Renaixença, a cultural revival movement of the late Romantic era. The bishop Josep Torras i Bages, one of the main figures of Catalan nationalism, called him the "Prince of Catalan poets". He was also known as mossèn (Father) Cinto Verdaguer, because of his career as a priest, and informally also simply "mossèn Cinto" (with Cinto being a short form of Jacint).

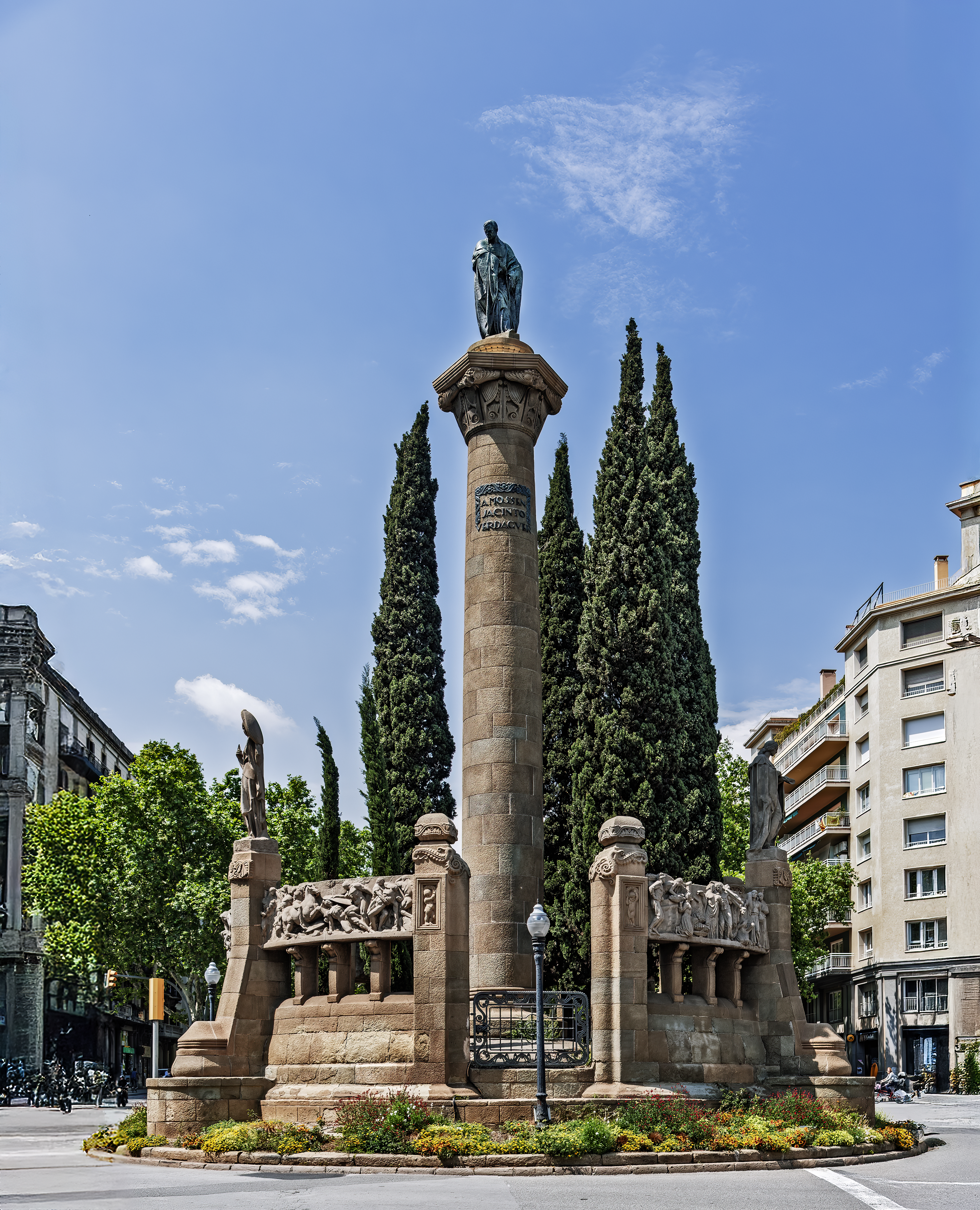
Jacint Verdaguer monument on Plaça de Mossèn Jacint Verdaguer in Barcelona.

== Life ==
He was born in Folgueroles, a town on the Plain of Vic, in the comarca of Osona (Province of Barcelona) to a modest family who valued learning. His father, Josep Verdaguer i Ordeix (Tavèrnoles, 1817 – Folgueroles, 1876), was a brickmason and farmer. His mother, Josepa Santaló i Planes (Folgueroles, 1819–1871), a housewife and farmer, was to exercise great influence over young Jacint, as she conveyed to him a love of literature, especially poetry, and was a deeply religious woman. He was the third of eight children, only three of whom survived. In 1855, at the age of 10, he entered the Seminary of Vic, as was expected for a child who was not the first-born under the system of primogeniture and had to make his livelihood without relying on an inheritance. Until then, he had lived like the other children in his town. The anecdotes told about him show that he stood out from his peers for his intelligence, astuteness and courage, as well as his athletic constitution. He displayed a balanced attitude without any apparent religious inclinations.

In 1863, when he was 18, he started to work as a tutor for a family at the Can Tona masia (where he also helped out on the farm), while he continued to study. Can Tona is in the municipal district of Sant Martí de Riudeperes, today Calldetenes (Osona).

In 1864, while a seminary student at the Seminari de Vic, Verdaguer wrote his first published poem Als estudiants. Recepta, written in the style of a satirical décima. He was influenced in this endeavour by the popularity of a similar satirical décima, Entusiasme d'un estudiant per la cresta written by fellow seminary student Andreu Garriga in 1863. That same year, he participated in Barcelona's Floral Games (Jocs Florals) poetry contest, though without distinction. However, he was more successful in the next two Jocs Florals, winning four prizes in 1865 and two in 1866. In the late 1860s, Verdaguer would become the central figure of the Esbart de Vic, a group of young poets in Vic inspired by the ideals of the Catalan Renaixença.

On 24 September 1870 he was ordained a priest by the bishop Lluís Jordà in Vic, and in October that same year, he said his first Mass, in the Sant Jordi hermitage. The next day he said his second Mass in the Sant Francesc hermitage near Vic. In 1871, his mother died (January 17) at the age of 52. On September 1 he was appointed bishop coadjutor of the small town of Vinyoles d'Orís and three days later he took up his charge.

In 1873, he published the cant (ode or song) "Passió de Nostre Senyor Jesucrist" (Passion of Our Lord Jesus Christ). He left Vinyoles d'Orís for health reasons and moved to Vic. He went on a trip to Roussillon and saw the mountain, El Canigó, possibly for the first time. In December, he joined the Companyia Transatlàntica trans-Atlantic steamship company as a chaplain because he was prescribed sea air for his health; he embarked in Cádiz bound for Havana, Cuba.

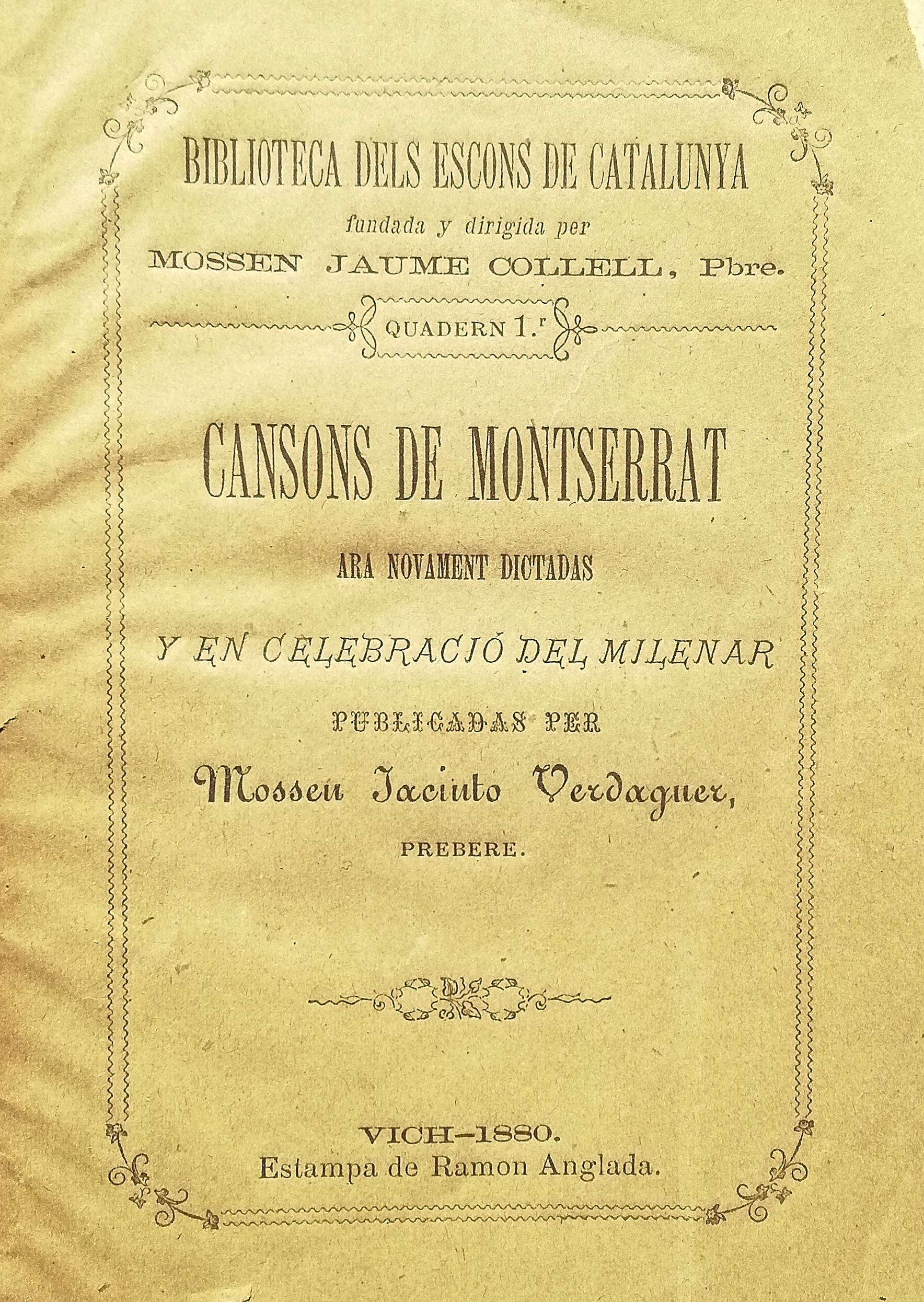
1880 first edition of Cançons de Montserrat (Songs of Montserrat), poems from the sacred mountain of Montserrat by Jacint Verdaguer

On 8 September 1876 his father died at the age of 65. On board the "Ciudad Condal", on the return voyage from Cuba, Jacint Verdaguer finished his epic poem L'Atlàntida. In November he entered the palace of Antonio López, 1st Marquess of Comillas as an alms chaplain.

In 1877, when he was 32, and having returned from his journey, the jury of the Jocs Florals awarded him the special prize of the Diputation of Barcelona for L'Atlàntida. Now he had earned his reputation as a poet.

In 1878, he traveled to Rome, where he was granted an audience with Pope Leo XIII. They discussed Verdaguer's poem L'Atlàntida. In 1880, as the winner of three prizes in the Jocs Florals, he was proclaimed "Master of the Gay Sciences" (Mestre en Gai Saber). That same year he published his book of poetry, Montserrat, which included "Llegenda de Montserrat", a legend (or two) in the form of a poem with 13 cantos.

In 1883, the Barcelona City Council published a print-run of 100,000 copies of his "Oda a Barcelona" (Ode to Barcelona), a 46-stanza poem. Such a print-run was quite remarkable given that the population of Barcelona at the time was 350,000, which would have amounted to about a copy per household. At the age of 39, Verdaguer traveled to Paris, Switzerland, Germany and Russia.

His collection of poems Caritat (Charity, 1885) was published to raise funds for reconstruction after the 1884 Andalusian earthquake.

On 21 March 1886, when he was 41 years old, Bishop Morgades crowned him 'Poet of Catalonia' in the monastery of Ripoll. He published the epic poem Canigó and made a pilgrimage to the Holy Land.

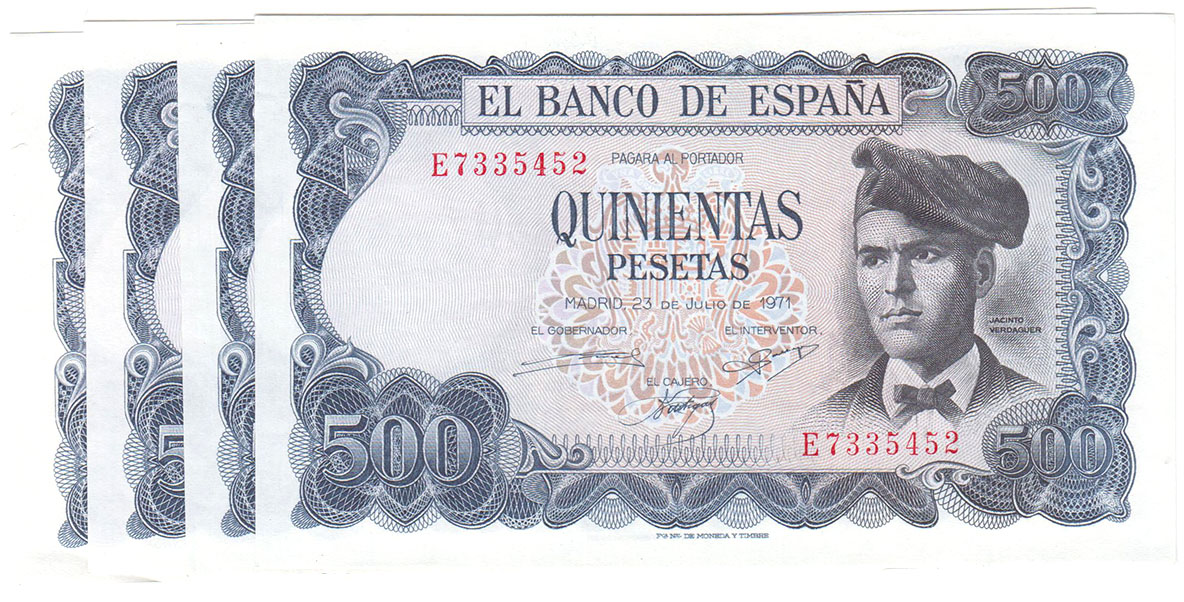
A young Jacinto Verdaguer wearing a barretina is depicted on the Spanish 1971 500 Pesetas banknote..

In 1893, following controversy about aspects of his work as a priest, he left the post of alms chaplain at Claudio López, 2nd Marquess of Comillas' palace. The publication of the trilogy Jesús Infant was completed, and he was assigned to the sanctuary of La Gleva. For a period, he was stripped of his office as priest, although this was eventually restored. In 1894, the books Roser de tot l'any and Veus del bon pastor were published. On 31 March he left the sanctuary of La Gleva.

On 17 May 1902, his 57th birthday, he moved from his home at Carrer Aragó 235 in Barcelona to the country house known as Vil·la Joana, in Vallvidrera (Barcelona), where he hoped to convalesce. On 10 June he died in Vil·la Joana, which is now one of the Museum of the History of Barcelona (MUHBA) heritage sites.

Verdaguer was buried in Montjuïc Cemetery in Barcelona.

He was depicted on the Spanish 1971 500 Pesetas banknote.

== Selected works ==
Among his works are:

- L'Atlàntida (Atlantis, 1876), epic poem
- Idil·lis i cants místics (Idylls and Mystic Songs, 1879), book of poems
- Montserrat (1880, 1899), book of poems on the topic of Montserrat
- "A Barcelona" ("To Barcelona", 1883), ode in 46 stanzas
- Caritat (Charity, 1885)
- Canigó (1886), epic poem
- Sant Francesc (Saint Francis, 1895)
- Flors del Calvari (Flowers of Calvary, 1896)

The scenic cantata Atlàntida, composed by Manuel de Falla and completed after de Falla's death by Ernesto Halffter, is based on Verdaguer's L'Atlàntida. Manuel de Falla considered this large-scale orchestral piece to be the most important of all his works.

Composer Maria Luisa Ponsa used Verdaguer's text in her song "Lo Lliri Blanc."

Some of his shorter poems are well known as songs in Catalonia, especially "L'Emigrant" ("Sweet Catalonia, country of my heart...").

== Bibliography ==
Verdaguer's works are collected in English in:

- Selected Poems of Jacint Verdaguer: A Bilingual Edition, edited and translated by Ronald Puppo, with an introduction by Ramon Pinyol i Torrents, University of Chicago Press, 2007, 339 pp. (ISBN 978-0226853000), (ISBN 0226853004)

== See also ==
- Pi de les Tres Branques, a tree popularised by Verdaguer as a Catalan national symbol
- Verdaguer House-Museum in Folgueroles
- Barcelona City History Museum and its Vil·la Joana House
- Monastery of Saint-André d'Eixalada
