= Príncipe de Asturias (ocean liner) =

Spanish ocean liner (1914–1916)

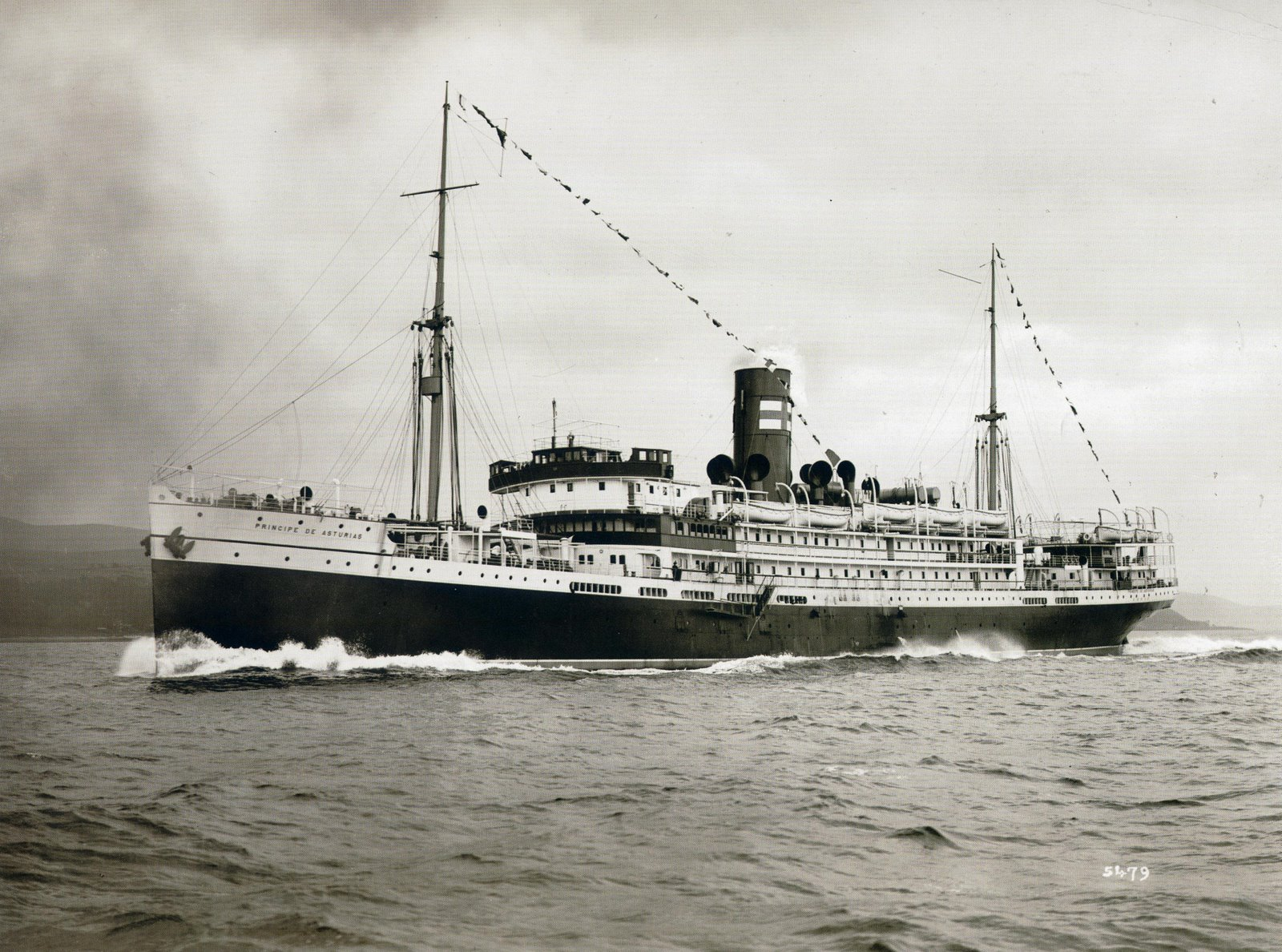
- Príncipe de Asturias

History

Spain
- Name: Príncipe de Asturias
- Namesake: Prince of Asturias
- Owner: Naviera Pinillos
- Port of registry: Cádiz
- Route: Barcelona – Buenos Aires
- Builder: Russell & Co, Port Glasgow
- Yard number: 663
- Launched: 30 April 1914
- Completed: July 1914
- Maiden voyage: 16 August 1914
- Fate: Ran aground & sank 5 March 1916

General characteristics
- Type: ocean liner
- Tonnage: 8,371 GRT, 5,115 NRT
- Length: 460.0 ft (140.2 m)
- Beam: 58.2 ft (17.7 m)
- Depth: 29.3 ft (8.9 m)
- Decks: 3
- Installed power: 1,134 NHP
- Propulsion: 2 × quadruple-expansion engines; 2 × screws
- Speed: 18 knots (33 km/h)
- Capacity: 1,890
- Crew: 200
- Notes: sister ship: Infanta Isabel

Príncipe de Asturias was a steam ocean liner, built in Scotland for the Spanish Naviera Pinillos. She was launched in 1914 and wrecked in 1916 with the loss of at least 445 lives. She was the sister ship of Pinillos' 8,170 GRT Infanta Isabel, which was launched in 1912.

Príncipe de Asturias was the last ocean liner to be built in the United Kingdom for a Spanish shipping line. Thereafter the Sociedad Española de Construcción Naval (SECN) developed its shipyards to meet the Spanish merchant fleet's need for larger and more modern ships.

The ship was named after the Prince of Asturias, the title of the heir apparent to the Spanish Crown. She is one of several ships to have been called Príncipe de Asturias. Others include a 44-gun frigate sunk in 1721, the former Acacia-class sloop HMS Iris, which was converted into a merchant ship in 1920 and sank in 1930, and the Spanish aircraft carrier Príncipe de Asturias, which was launched in 1982 and sold for scrap in 2015.

== Building ==
Russell & Co built Príncipe de Asturias in its Kingston yard at Port Glasgow, Scotland, launching her on 30 April 1914, and completing her that July. Her sister Infanta Isabel had briefly been the largest ship in the Spanish merchant fleet. However, by the time Príncipe de Asturias had been built, Pinillos' main competitor, Compañía Transatlántica Española, had taken delivery of the larger liners Reina Victoria-Eugenia and Infanta Isabel de Borbon.

Principe de Asturias' length was 460.0 ft (140.2 m), her beam was 58.2 ft (17.7 m), and her depth was 29.3 ft (8.9 m). Her tonnages were 8,371 GRT and 5,115 NRT. She had twin screws, each driven by a quadruple-expansion steam engine built by David Rowan & Co of Glasgow. The combined power of her twin engines was rated at 1,134 NHP.

== Route ==
In 1916 Príncipe de Asturias' route was Barcelona – Buenos Aires, with several intermediate ports of call, including Santos in Brazil.

== Loss ==
Shortly before dawn on 5 March 1916, while trying to approach the port of Santos in dense fog, the ship ran aground on shoals about 3 nautical miles (5.6 km) east of Ponta do Boi on the island of Ilhabela, opening a huge hole in her hull.

Water entered her boiler room, causing some of her boilers to explode, and she lost power. The ship listed to starboard and soon capsized. She sank in five minutes, killing at least 445 of the 588 people aboard.

Only one lifeboat was launched, initially carrying 20 people. At dawn and in the morning the lifeboat gathered more than 100 people. The French cargo ship Vega rescued 143 people, including the swimmer Marina Vidal and the only Brazilian on board, José Martins Vianna.

The sinking of the ship remains the deadliest maritime disaster in Brazilian history to date.

== Bibliography ==
- Dunn, Laurence (1973). Merchant Ships of the World in Colour 1910–1929. London: Blandford Press Ltd. ISBN 0-7137-0569-8.
- García Novell, Francisco (2009). Naufragio, la historia olvidada del Titanic español (in Spanish). Madrid: La esfera de los libros. ISBN 978-84-9734-881-2.
- Lloyd's Register of Shipping. Vol. I.–Steamers. London: Lloyd's Register of Shipping. 1914 – via Internet Archive.
- Sella, Antoni; Martín, Rodrigo (2002). Vapores (in Spanish). Barcelona: Angle editorial. ISBN 84-88811-99-3.
- Silvares, José Carlos; Heinde Aranha Moura; RLuis Felipe (2006). Príncipe de Asturias: O Mistério das Profundezas. Magma Editora Cultural.
