= SS Rochambeau =

French transatlantic liner

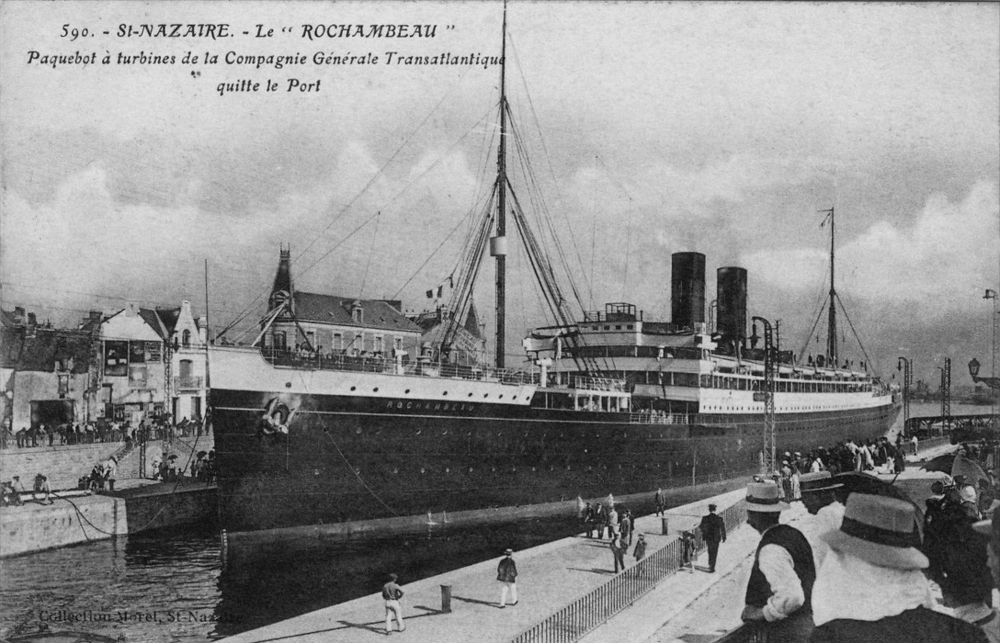
- Rochambeau leaving Saint-Nazaire

History

France
- Name: Rochambeau
- Namesake: Comte de Rochambeau
- Owner: Cie Générale Transatlantique
- Operator: Cie Générale Transatlantique
- Port of registry: Le Havre
- Route: Le Havre – New York (1911–15, 1919–33); Bordeaux – New York (1915–19)
- Builder: Chantiers de l'Atlantique
- Launched: 2 March 1911
- Completed: 1911
- Maiden voyage: 30 Aug or 16 Sep 1911 (see text)
- Refit: 1919, 1926, 1927
- Identification: Code letters OSAN (until 1933); Call sign FTR (until 1933); call sign FNTW (1934)
- Fate: Scrapped 1934

General characteristics
- Type: Ocean liner
- Tonnage: 12,678 GRT, 6,620 NRT
- Displacement: 17,300 tons
- Length: 559.4 ft (170.5 m)
- Beam: 63.7 ft (19.4 m)
- Depth: 43.3 ft (13.2 m)
- Decks: 4
- Propulsion: 4 × Propellers: 2 × Triple-expansion engines; 2 × Steam turbines
- Speed: 17 knots (31 km/h; 20 mph)
- Capacity: 1911: 420 1st & 2nd class berths; 1,450 steerage class berths; 1919: 475 cabin class; 1,450 3rd class
- Crew: 400
- Sensors & processing systems: Direction finding (by 1930)
- Armament: (in First World War): 2 × naval guns

SS Rochambeau was a French transatlantic ocean liner of the Compagnie Générale Transatlantique (CGT). She was launched in 1911 and was the first French ship to be powered by a combination of reciprocating steam engines and steam turbines.

She was named after the Comte de Rochambeau, a French aristocrat and marshal who led an army in the American Revolutionary War.

== Combining reciprocating and turbine engines ==
A turbine is smaller, simpler, lighter, faster, smoother and more reliable than an equivalent triple- or quadruple-expansion piston engine. UK shipyards had built the first turbine-powered commercial ship, King Edward, launched in 1901, and the first turbine-powered transatlantic liners, Allan Line's Victorian and Virginian, both launched in 1904.

But a turbine consumes more fuel than an equivalent triple- or quadruple-expansion piston engine. It cannot run in reverse, and does not run well at low speed. Another limitation was that early turbines drove their propeller shafts directly, as satisfactory reduction gearing had yet to be developed. The speed at which a turbine runs efficiently is several times faster than that at which a marine propeller runs efficiently.

UK shipyards responded by developing steamships that combined reciprocating and turbine engines. The first was the refrigerated cargo liner Otaki, closely followed by the transatlantic liner Laurentic, both launched in 1908. Otaki and Laurentic each had three screws. The port and starboard screws were each powered by a triple-expansion engine. Exhaust steam from their low-pressure cylinders fed a single low-pressure turbine amidships that drove the middle screw.

Otaki and Laurentic could go astern, slowly forward or manoeuvre using only their piston engines. For higher speeds they could use the turbine as well, increasing both power and fuel efficiency. Laurentic proved both more economic and more powerful than her sister Megantic, which had twin quadruple-expansion engines and no low-pressure turbine. The comparison influenced Harland and Wolff to apply the same triple screw, reciprocating and turbine combination in the White Star Olympic-class ocean liner.

== Building and early service ==
Chantiers de l'Atlantique built Rochambeau at Saint-Nazaire, launching her on 2 March 1911. Her design was an enlargement of the 10,502 GRT Chicago, which Chantiers de l'Atlantique had launched in 1907 and completed in 1908. Rochambeau was launched on 2 March 1911 and completed later that year.

Unlike Otaki, Laurentic and the Olympic-class ocean liners, Rochambeau had four screws: two driven by four-cylinder triple-expansion engines and two by low-pressure turbines. Her piston engines ran at 115 RPM and her turbines (when in use) ran at 350 RPM. Nine boilers supplied steam at 200 lb_{f}/in^{2} to her piston engines. Chantiers de l'Atlantique designed Rochambeau to achieve a speed of 17 knots (31 km/h).

Rochambeau was designed with berths for 420 first & second class passengers and 1,450 steerage class.

Rochambeau left Le Havre on her maiden voyage to New York on either 30 August or 16 September 1911.

CGT was satisfied with its choice of four screws instead of three. On CGT's advice, Swan, Hunter and Wigham Richardson adopted the same arrangement when it built the liner Reina Victoria-Eugenia for Compañía Transatlántica Española in 1912–13. Experience with Rochambeau also influenced the design of CGT's Flandre launched in 1913 and Lafayette launched in 1914.

By 1914 Rochambeau was equipped for wireless telegraphy. She operated on the standard 300 and 600 metre wavelengths. Her call sign was FTR.

== First World War ==
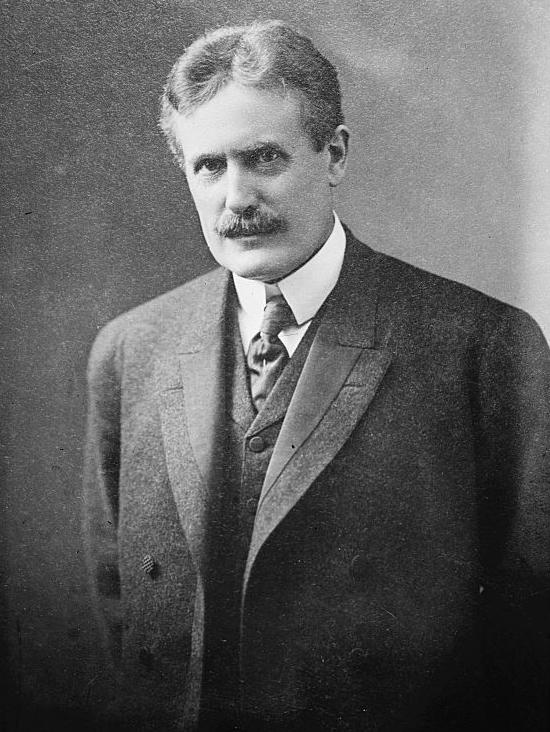
Myron T. Herrick, US Ambassador in Paris 1912–14

After the outbreak of the First World War the US Ambassador in Paris, Myron T. Herrick, chartered Rochambeau and another CGT liner, Espagne, to repatriate US citizens from Europe. Rochambeau was booked to leave Le Havre on 28 August 1914 carrying 1,200 US citizens. When Herrick retired as US Ambassador in November 1914, he too returned to New York on Rochambeau.

CGT kept Rochambeau on the same route until March 1915, despite the extra pressure on Le Havre as a port supplying the British Expeditionary Force and the danger from German Navy U-boats operating in the English Channel. CGT transferred Rochambeau's sailings to Bordeaux in April 1915.

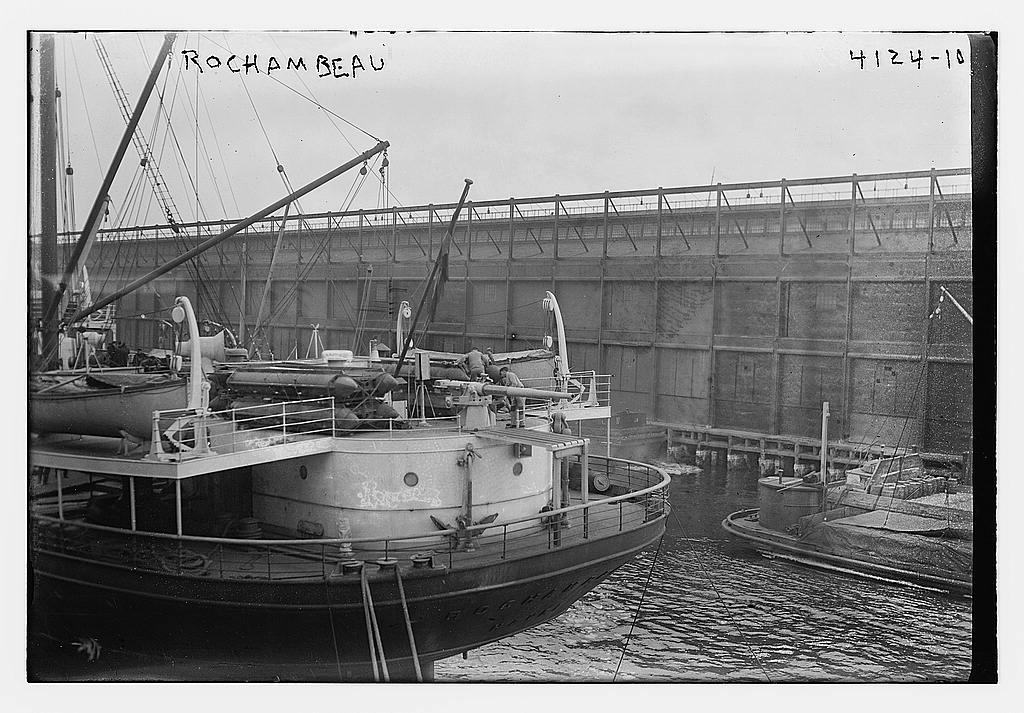
Rochambeau's stern, showing the naval gun on her poop deck

In the war the Entente Allies defensively armed their merchant ships, generally with a single naval gun on the stern. The USA was neutral until April 1917, but from September 1914 its Department of State allowed an armed merchant ship of a belligerent country to use US ports on condition that she was armed with no more than two guns, they were not more than 6-inch (150 mm) calibre, no guns were mounted on the forward part of the ship, her cargo excluded war materiél, and her passengers as a whole were not suitable for military service.

On 8 November 1915 en route from New York to Bordeaux a fire broke out aboard Rochambeau. Her officers held an investigation but failed to determine the cause.

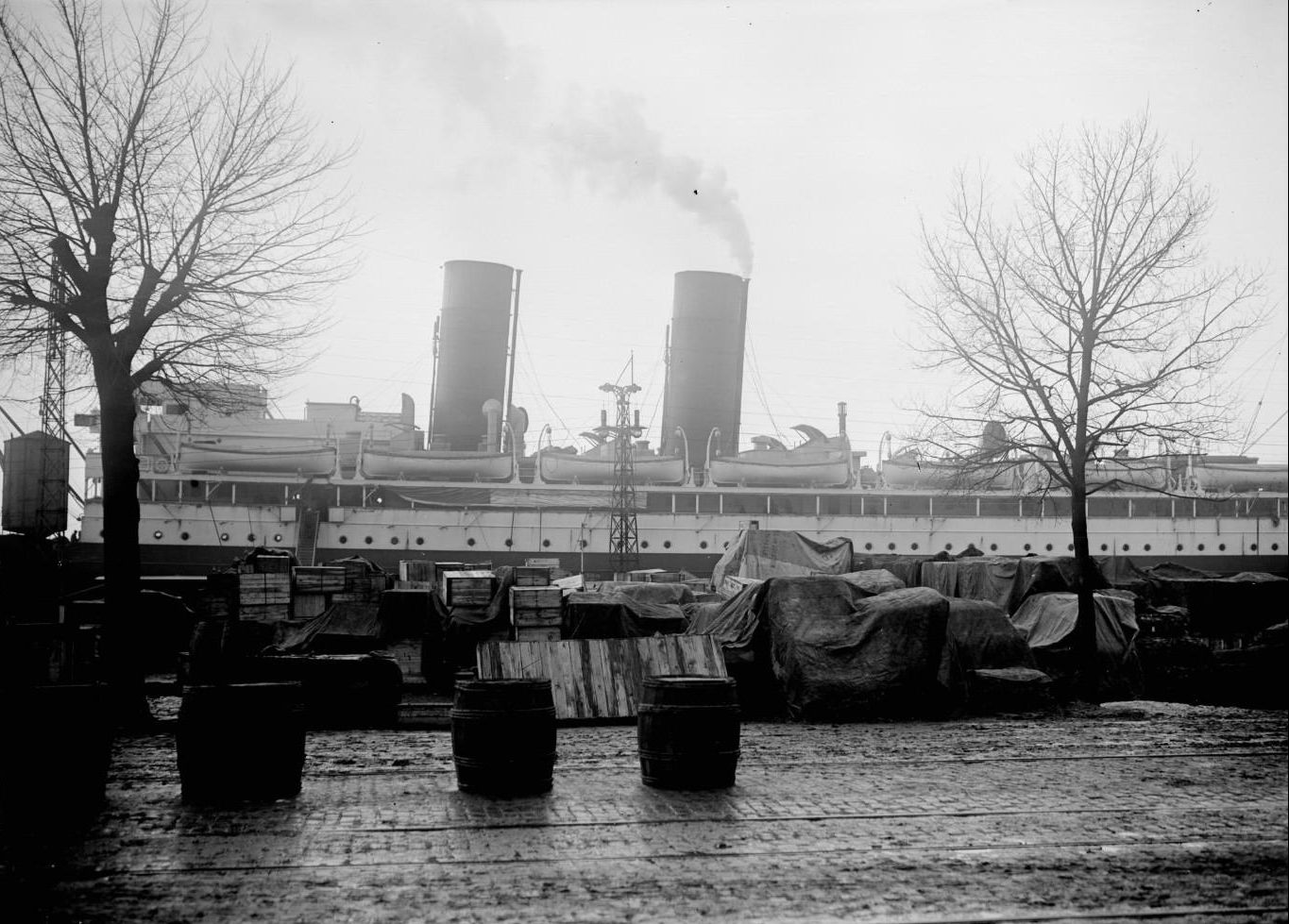
Rochambeau at Bordeaux in December 1916

In February 1916, 11 people in Bordeaux were convicted of either stealing valuables from CGT passengers' luggage or handling the stolen goods. The stolen items included a jewel box from Rochambeau insured for $4,000, and items from passengers aboard Chicago and Espagne.

From February 1915 Germany had waged unrestricted submarine warfare against Entente merchant ships. Therefore, by March 1917 Rochambeau's armament was increased to two guns. As well as the usual gun on her poop deck she had a 90 mm (3.5 in) gun on her forecastle. The latter breached the USA's rule, but the State Department allowed her to continue to use the Port of New York.

On 29 April 1917 Rochambeau's gunners opened fire on a "suspicious object" astern, and then off her starboard beam at a range of about 800 yards. About 12 shots were fired, but it was misty and it was not clear whether the object was a submarine or a whale.

== Post war service ==
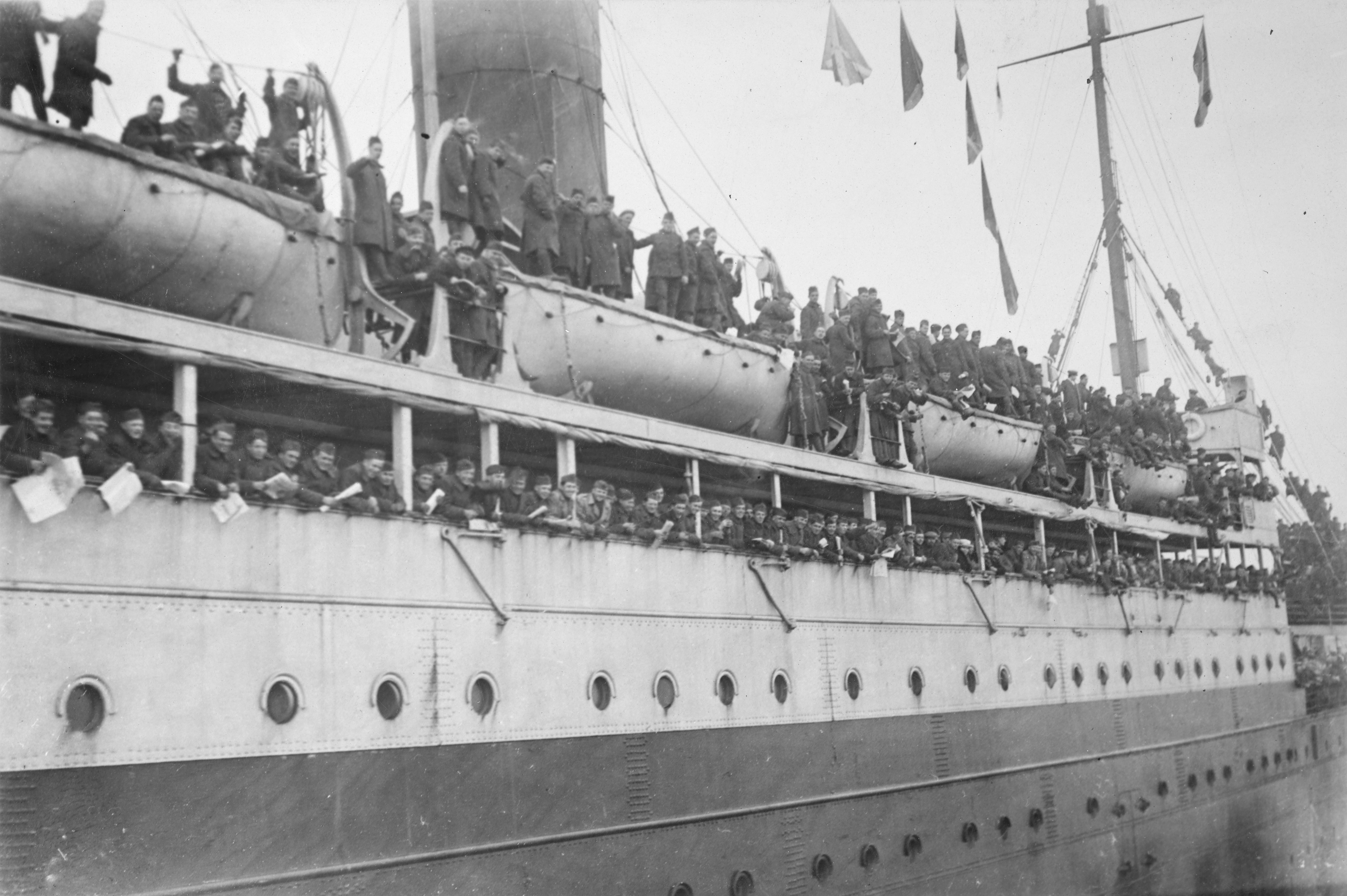
Men of the 102nd Engineers, 27th Division, lining Rochambeau's side

In 1919 after the First World War Rochambeau brought service personnel home to the USA. On one crossing in January she repatriated 883 men of the 337th and 339th field artillery, 88th Infantry Division and medical units. On another in September she brought home 245 Czech Americans and Slovak Americans who had served in the Czechoslovak Legion in France.

Lafayette's westbound crossing in January 1919 was marred by engine trouble three days out of Bordeaux, which reduced her speed to 9 knots (17 km/h). She then stopped in Halifax, Nova Scotia for four days for bunkering. She reached New York 17 days after leaving Bordeaux. The ship carried 554 civilian passengers on the voyage as well as 883 US troops, and her Master imposed rationing to ensure her supply of food lasted for the prolonged voyage.

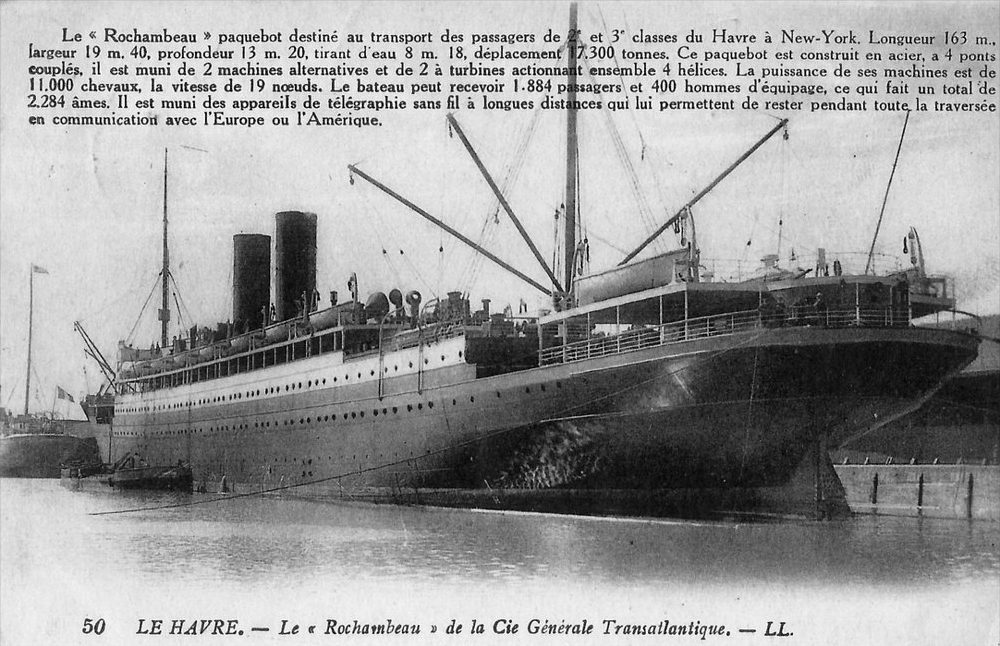
1919 postcard of Rochambeau, with a caption claiming that she could do 19 knots (35 km/h)

Rochambeau last sailed from Bordeaux in January 1919 and reverted to Le Havre in February. Also in 1919 her first and second class accommodation was refitted as 475 berths for "cabin class", a new concept that the Canadian Pacific Steamship Company had pioneered in the First World War.

On 15 August 1924 Rochambeau suffered a broken crankshaft en route from Le Havre to New York. She continued under her own power at reduced speed.

On the morning of 21 February 1925 Rochambeau collided with the Anchor Line liner Tuscania in New York Harbour, damaging both ships above the waterline. The two ships were at anchor, and as they swung with the turn of the tide Rochambeau's stern struck Tuscania's bow. Damage to Rochambeau was assessed at $100,000.

Rochambeau sustained storm damage at sea on 30 December 1925. CGT took her out of service, sent her to Toulon for repairs and announced that it would use the occasion to have her converted from coal to oil fuel.

The Immigration Act of 1924 limited migration to the US, which reduced steerage class traffic. Therefore, while Rochambeau was at Toulon, CGT had her steerage berths replaced by "tourist class". She returned to service in August 1926. Her accommodation was revised again in December 1927 to three classes: cabin, tourist and third.

In June 1931 the United Press Association reported that Rochambeau collided with a vessel called Uncheria off Ushant. UPA reported that Uncheria was sunk, Rochambeau suffered slight damage, and Rochambeau rescued all 29 crew from Uncheria. Numerous newspapers published the story, but the Waikato Times noted that there was no vessel called Uncheria in Lloyd's Register.

Rochambeau made her final Le Havre – Vigo – New York crossing in July 1933. In 1934 her code letters OSAN and original wireless call sign were superseded by the call sign FNTW, but by then she was waiting to be scrapped. She was broken up at Dunkirk.

== See also ==
- Rochambeau bomb plot

== Bibliography ==
- The Marconi Press Agency Ltd (1914). The Year Book of Wireless Telegraphy and Telephony. London: The Marconi Press Agency Ltd.
