= Karl Rose (disambiguation) =

Karl Rose is a football manager.

Karl Rose may also refer to:

- Karl Rose (naval officer), German naval officer
- Karl Philipp Sebottendorf van der Rose
- Carl Rosa, born Karl Rose

== See also ==
- Karlos Rosé, Dominican musician
- Carl Rose (disambiguation)
- Charlie Rose (disambiguation)
- Rose (disambiguation)
