= Charlie Rose (disambiguation) =

Charlie Rose (born 1942) is an American news personality.

Charles, Chuck, or Charlie Rose may also refer to:

- Charlie Rose (talk show), American television interview show from 1991 to 2017, with Charlie Rose served as executive producer, executive editor

== Politicians ==
- Charles A. Rose (1939–2022), American politician, mayor of Chattanooga, Tennessee (1975–1983)
- Charlie Rose (politician) (1939–2012), Democratic United States congressman from North Carolina, 1973–1997
- Sir Charles Rose, 1st Baronet (1847–1913), British-Canadian businessman, race horse breeder, yachtsman and Liberal politician

== Sportspeople ==
- Charlie Rose (footballer) (1872–1949), English footballer
- Charles Rose (Olympic athlete) (1873–1957), American tug of war athlete who competed in the 1904 Summer Olympics
- Chuck Rose (1885–1961), American baseball player

== Other people ==
- Charles Rose (bishop) (died 1791), Anglican clergyman
- Charles Henry Rose (1873–1948), sheriff of Honolulu
- Charles Rose (architect) (born 1960), American architect based out of Massachusetts
- Charles Rose (artist) (1921–2017), New Zealand artist

== See also ==
- Pete Rose (born 1941), nicknamed "Charlie Hustle", American baseball player
- Rose Charlie (1930–2018), Amerindian leader
- Charles Roser (1864–1937), American businessman
- Carl Rose (disambiguation)
- Karl Rose (disambiguation)
- Rose (disambiguation)
