= Compañía Transatlántica Española =

Compañía Transatlántica Española, S.A.
- Company shipping line house flag
- Type: Sociedad Anónima
- Industry: transport
- Founded: 1849
- Defunct: 2012
- Headquarters: Madrid, Spain
- Products: Passenger and cargo shipping
- Services: Ship owner and ship operator

Compañía Transatlántica Española, S.A. (Transatlantic Company of Spain, abbreviated CTE), also known as the Spanish Line in English, was a passenger ocean line that has largely ceased operations although it still exists as a company. It is popularly known as "La Trasatlántica" in the Spanish language.

== History ==
CTE's first office in Spain was in Santander in the 19th century. Its head office was transferred to Barcelona after Antonio L. Lopez, the owner of the company, married Luisa Bru Lassús.

"La Trasatlántica" was established in colonial Cuba in 1850 as "Compañia de Vapores Correos A. López" by Spanish businessman and slave trader Don Antonio L. López. It began operations with a 400-ton sail-steamer.

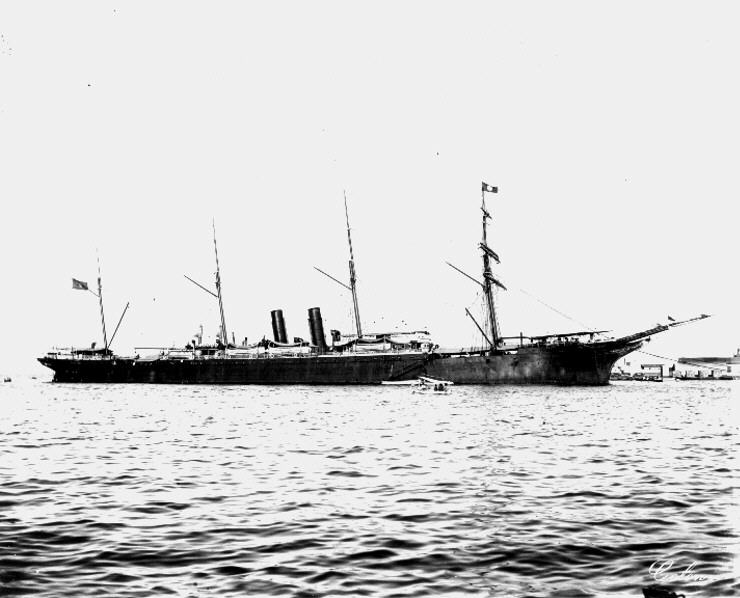
The steamship Colón at Port Said in 1898. She tried unsuccessfully to break the US naval blockade of the Philippines in the Spanish–American War.

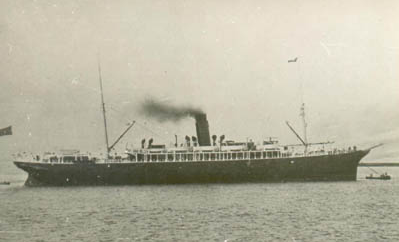
The steamship Alfonso XIII which was launched in 1889. She sank at Santander in 1915.

In 1878 Antonio L. López was ennobled with the title of Marquess of Comillas. His company changed its name to "Compañía Transatlántica Española", its present name, after being registered as a joint stock company in 1881. After the Marquess of Comillas's death in 1883, his fourth son, Don Claudio B. Lopez, took charge of the company. By 1894 the Compañía Transatlántica Española fleet reached 33 vessels with a total of 93,500 registered tons.

In the 1898 Spanish–American War the Spanish Navy used 21 CTE ships as auxiliary vessels. They tried to break the blockade that the United States imposed on Cuba and the Philippines, the last great colonies of the Spanish crown, but were mostly unsuccessful.

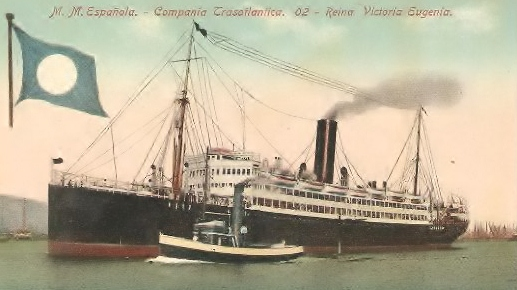
Reina Victoria-Eugenia, built in England in 1912 and renamed Argentina in 1931

After that war CTE's fleet became increasingly obsolescent, and its largest liners were small by international standards. It began to renew its fleet with two new technologically advanced sister ships launched in 1912: Reina Victoria-Eugenia from England and Infanta Isabel de Borbon from Scotland.

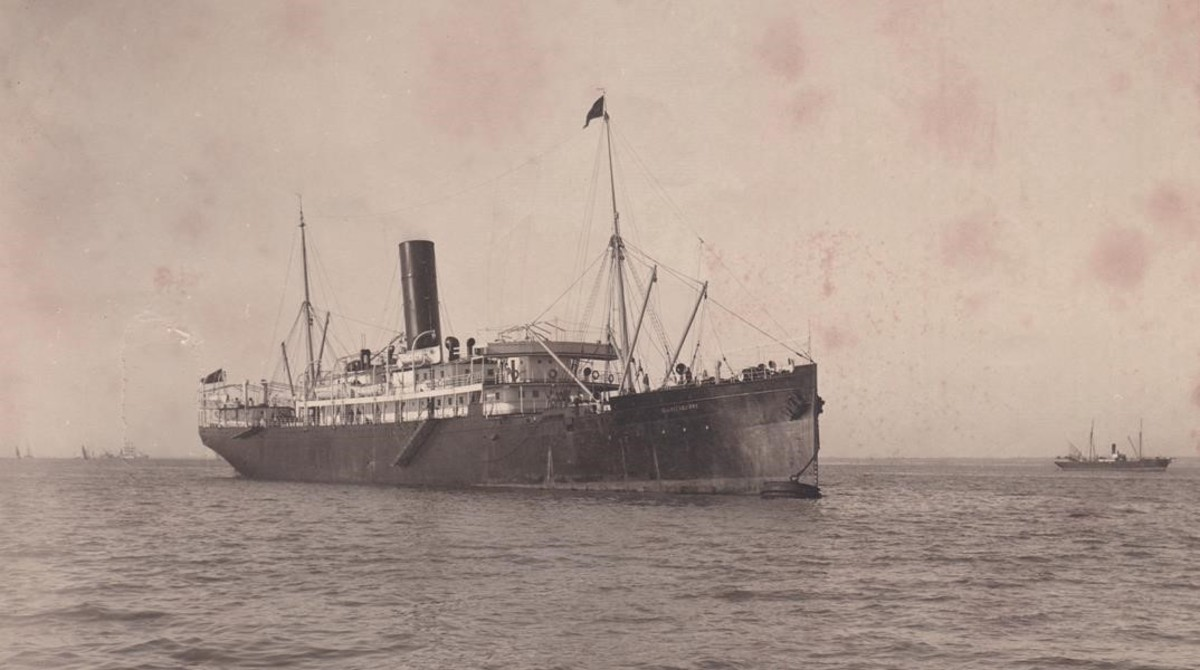
Carlos de Eizaguirre, mined in 1917 with the loss of 134 lives

In 1917 a mine sank the CTE liner Carlos de Eizaguirre off Robben Island, killing 134 people. CTE claimed that the UK had planted the mine. The UK Admiralty denied it, and alleged that the German raider SMS Wolf had planted the mine.

After the First World War CTE continued to modernise its fleet. The Spanish-based shipbuilder Sociedad Española de Construcción Naval (SECN) was now able to build ocean liners as large as those CTE had previously bought from abroad, and the Marquess of Comillas owned 30 percent of SECN, so CTE commissioned SECN to supply the 10,500 GRT turbine steamships Alfonso XIII and Cristóbal Colón, both launched in 1923.

Claudio B. López, second Marquess of Comillas, died in 1925. A new 9,922 GRT ship launched in 1928 was named Marques de Comillas after him.

After the proclamation of the Second Spanish Republic in 1931, CTE renamed ships that had borne the names of members of the Spanish royal family. Alfonso XIII became Habana, after Havana in Cuba. Reina Victoria-Eugenia and Infanta Isabel de Borbon operated the mail ship service between Spain and the Río de la Plata, so they were renamed Argentina and Uruguay respectively.

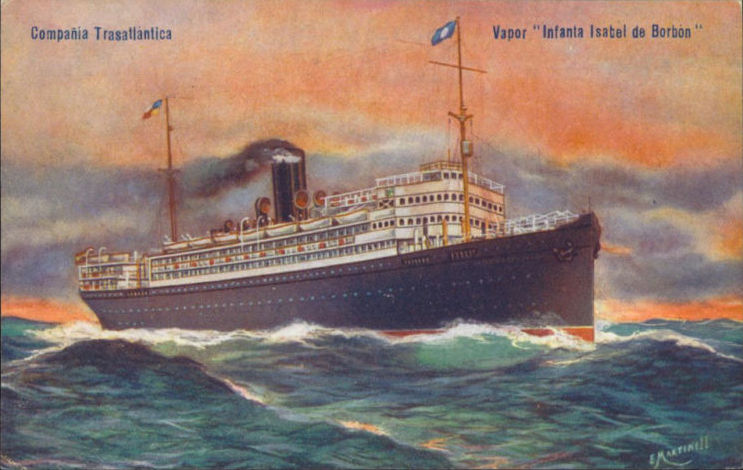
Infanta Isabel de Borbon, built in Scotland in 1912 and renamed Uruguay in 1931

The Spanish government had subsidised CTE to provide the mail service. In 1932 the Republican government withdrew the subsidy, so CTE withdrew the service and laid up Argentina and Uruguay at Barcelona.

The Spanish Civil War between 1936 and 1939 destroyed much of CTE's fleet, and left much of the remainder in disrepair. The Spanish Republican Navy requisitioned some CTE ships and used them to evacuate refugees from coastal cities besieged by the Nationalist armies. In 1939 Nationalist air raids sank Argentina and Uruguay in Barcelona.

Between 1950 and 1960 CTE slowly recovered, but post-war advances in civil aviation overtook its passenger business. CTE shares fell and the ailing company lost investors. In 1960, at one of CTE's shareholders' meetings it was proposed to transform CTE into an airline, but funds were not forthcoming. Between the mid-1960s and 1974, CTE liquidated practically all its fleet.

One of the last luxury ocean-liners of the company was ship Virginia de Churruca, sold to Trasmediterránea which used it for ferry services to the Balearic Islands. The profits from sales like these, undertaken "at the point of death", were minimal.

In 1978 a non-functional Compañía Transatlántica Española was integrated into the Instituto Nacional de Industria (INI), a Spanish state entity that absorbed failed companies in order to service debt, among other purposes.

In 1994 CTE became a private company after being acquired by Naviera del Odiel. CTE managed to survive, but was only engaged minor shipping operations using chartered ships, as well as in real-estate business. In its last days CTE was not even a shadow of the transoceanic shipping company it was in its heyday, when its luxury passenger liners cruised the World's oceans.

Following the strengthening of the Euro currency between 2005 and 2006, as well as higher fuel costs, CTE found it increasingly difficult to service the debts to its creditors. Finally, in September 2012 it entered an insolvency procedure.

== Monuments ==
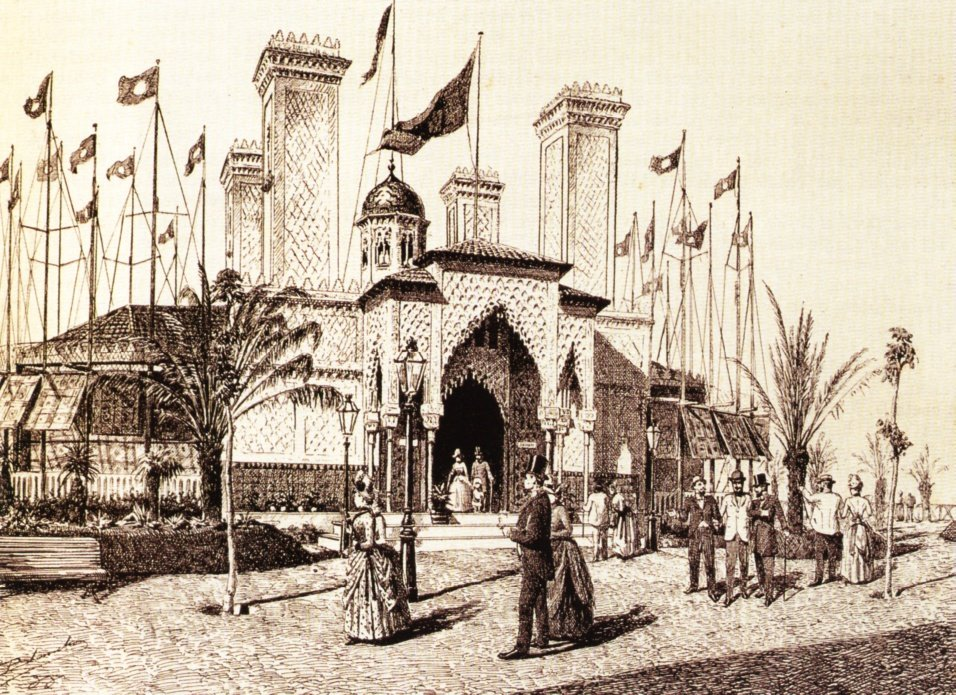
CTE pavilion at the 1888 Barcelona Universal Exposition, was designed by Antoni Gaudí

CTE had a pavilion in the maritime section of the 1888 Barcelona Universal Exposition. It designed by Catalan architect Antoni Gaudí, better known for the Sagrada Família. The CTE pavilion was demolished only a few years after its completion to make way for the Passeig Marítim, Barcelona's harbor promenade. Models of this now-demolished structure can be seen at the Sagrada Família museum.

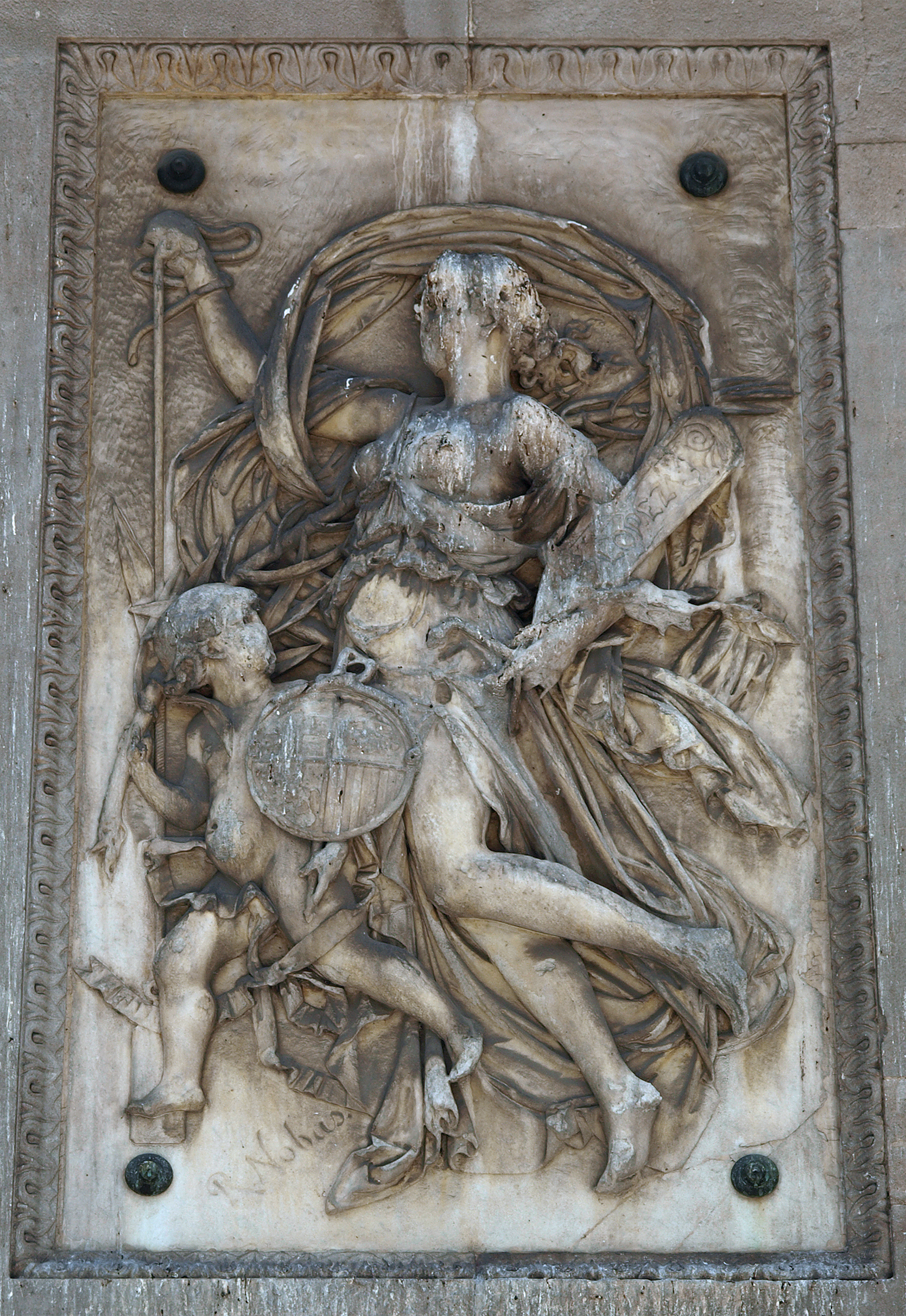
Compañía Transatlántica allegory, by Rossend Nobas, on one side of the monument "Antonio López López" in Barcelona.

There is a sculptural relief representing a Compañía Transatlántica allegory on one side of the monument "Antonio López López" in Barcelona. This work was made by the Catalan sculptor Rossend Nobas.

== See also ==
- Antonio L. López (shipwreck)
- Claudio B. Lopez
- General Tabacco Company of the Philippines

== Bibliography ==
- Dunn, Laurence (1973). Merchant Ships of the World in Colour 1910–1929. London: Blandford Press Ltd. ISBN 0-7137-0569-8.
