= Manuel Goded =

Spanish Army general

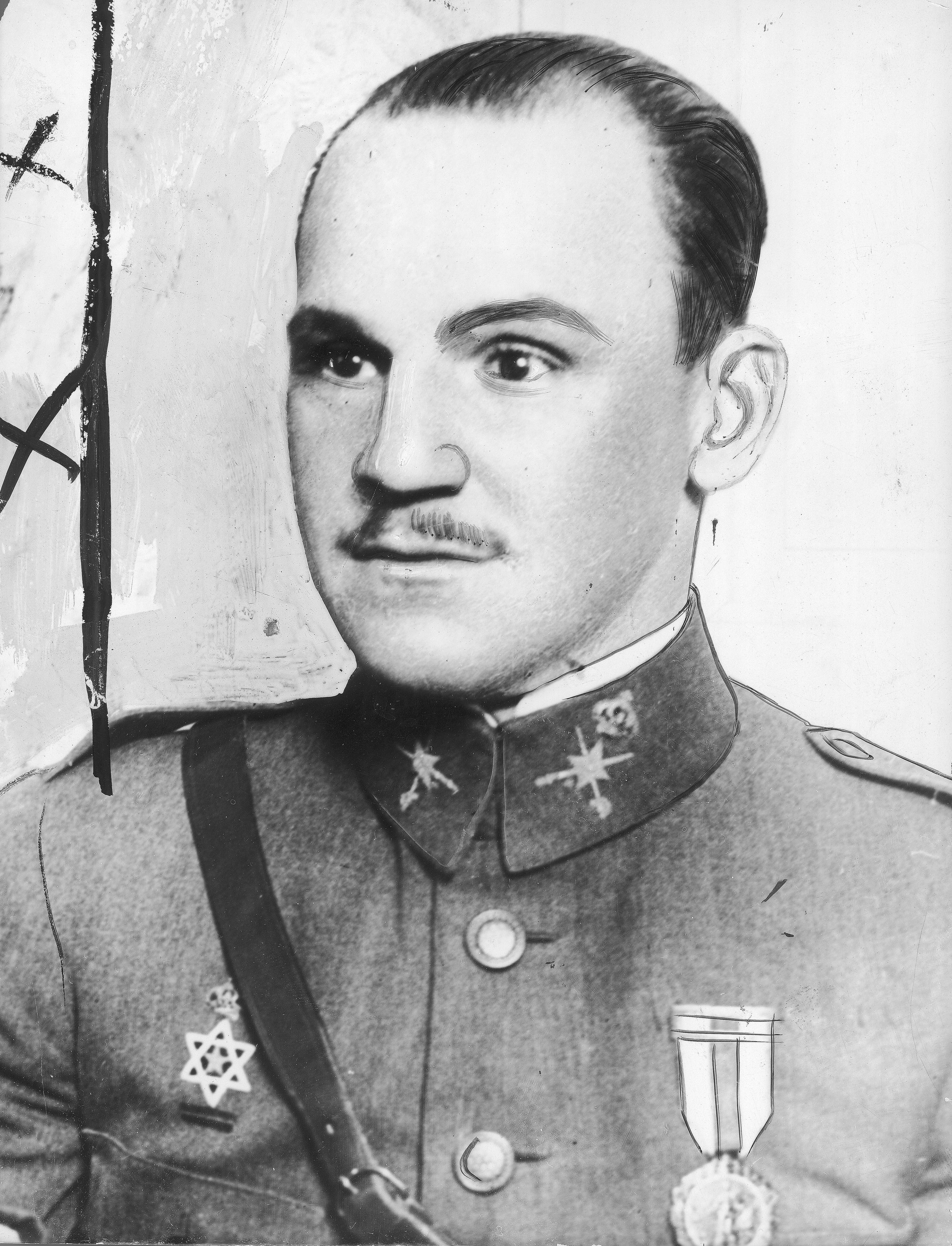
- Born: 15 October 1882; San Juan, Puerto Rico
- Died: 12 August 1936 (aged 53); Montjuïc Castle, Barcelona, Catalonia, Spain
- Cause of death: Execution by firing squad
- Military career
- Allegiance: Kingdom of Spain (1900–1931); Spanish Republic (1931–1936); Nationalist Spain (1936)
- Branch: Spanish Army
- Service years: 1900–1936
- Rank: General of the Army
- Commands: Chief of Staff of the Spanish Army of Africa; Chief of Staff of the Central Army
- Conflicts: Rif War; Battle of Alhucemas; Spanish Civil War (executed)

Manuel Goded Llopis (15 October 1882 – 12 August 1936) was a Spanish Army general who was one of the key figures in the July 1936 revolt against the democratic government of Manuel Azaña. Having unsuccessfully led an attempted insurrection in Barcelona, he was captured and executed by the Republican government. Previously, Goded had distinguished himself in the Battle of Alhucemas during the Rif War.

== Early life ==
He was born in the city of San Juan, the capital of Puerto Rico, then a Spanish colony. There, he received his primary and secondary education. His family moved to Spain after Puerto Rico became a possession of the United States by the Treaty of Paris of 1898, which ended the Spanish–American War. In Spain, he enrolled and was accepted in the Academy of Infantry.

== Rif War ==
Goded graduated from the academy and was assigned to various posts. In 1907, when 25 years old, he held the rank of captain. In 1919, a rebellion against Spanish colonial rule took place in Spanish Morocco, a Spanish protectorate. The rebel leader in what is also known as the Rif War was Abd-el-Krim. The Riffians, as the rebels became known, annihilated the army of Spanish General Manuel Fernández Silvestre at the Battle of Annual in 1921 and were poised to attack the Spanish enclave of Melilla. Generals Jose Millan Astray and Francisco Franco, who founded the Spanish Foreign Legion, fought against the Riffians on land.

In 1925, Goded led an amphibious landing at Alhucemas Bay (now Al Hoceima Bay) in what is known as the Battle of Alhucemas. It was considered as the beginning of the end of the Rif Rebellion. By 1927, the rebellion had ended, and Spain recaptured her lost territory. Goded was promoted to brigadier general and soon was named chief of staff of the Spanish Army of Africa.

== Dictatorship and Second Republic ==
Goded at first supported the right-wing dictatorship of Miguel Primo de Rivera, which was established in 1923 with the consent of King Alfonso XIII. However, Goded's eventual criticism of the government led to his removal from the post.

He collaborated in the 1932 coup d'état attempt, after which he was forced to distance from the Armed Forces, but was called to return in 1934 to lead the repression of the Asturias revolt.

In May 1936, Manuel Azaña became the second and last president of the Second Spanish Republic. Goded was named Chief of Staff of the Central Army but was again relieved of his position after a conflict with the government. When right-wing officers suspected of plotting against the government were reassigned, he was exiled to a remote and inconsequential post on the Balearic Islands.

== Revolt and execution ==
When right-wing generals rebelled against the Popular Front government of the Second Republic in July 1936, Goded unsuccessfully led troops in the Catalan capital, Barcelona, after he had taken control of Mallorca and Ibiza. Catalonia, being among the most industrialised regions of Spain, was a stronghold of the organized left, and Goded's local operations failed. He was captured by government forces on August 11 and held on the prison ship Uruguay. Goded was tried by a Republican military court for treason and compelled to order his remaining troops, via radio, to surrender. Goded was sentenced to death by firing squad. He was executed the next day at Montjuïc Castle in Barcelona.

Goded's death not only decapitated the Nationalist revolt in Barcelona and greater Catalonia but also removed one of the key personal and political rivals to the movement's eventual leader, Francisco Franco.

== See also ==
- List of Puerto Ricans
- List of Puerto Rican military personnel
- Spanish Civil War
