= Carl Rose =

Carl Rose may refer to:

- Carl Rose (cartoonist) (1903–1971), cartoonist for The New Yorker
- Carl Rose (soccer) (born 1952), Canadian soccer player who played at the 1976 Olympics
- Carl Röse (1864-1947), German dentist

== See also ==
- Karl Rose (disambiguation)
- Charlie Rose (disambiguation)
- Rose (disambiguation)
