= SS Infanta Isabel de Borbon =

Steam ocean liner, built in Scotland for Spanish service to the River Plate

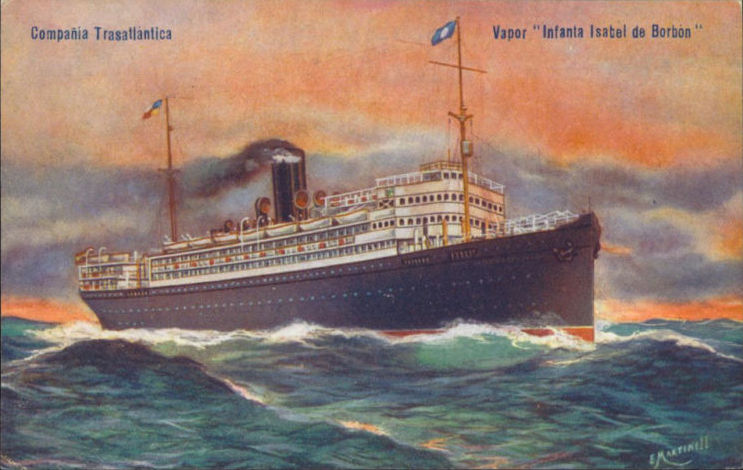
- 1913 postcard of Infanta Isabel de Borbon

History

Spain
- Name: 1912: Infanta Isabel de Borbon; 1931: Uruguay
- Namesake: 1912: Infanta Isabel, Countess of Girgenti; 1931: Uruguay
- Owner: Compañía Transatlántica Española
- Operator: Cía Transatlántica Española
- Port of registry: Barcelona
- Route: Barcelona – Buenos Aires
- Builder: Wm Denny & Bros, Dumbarton
- Yard number: 969
- Launched: 29 September 1912
- Completed: 15 March 1913
- Maiden voyage: 4 April 1913
- Identification: 1913: code letters HPBG; by 1914: call sign EDI; by 1934: call sign EAFG
- Fate: Sunk by air attack, raised, scrapped

General characteristics
- Type: ocean liner
- Tonnage: 10,348 GRT, 5,740 NRT
- Length: 481.9 ft (146.9 m)
- Beam: 61.3 ft (18.7 m)
- Draught: 25 ft (7.6 m)
- Depth: 32.7 ft (10.0 m)
- Decks: 3
- Installed power: 700 NHP
- Propulsion: 2 × triple-expansion steam engines; 1 × low-pressure steam turbine; 3 × screws
- Speed: 17 knots (31 km/h)
- Capacity: 100 1st class; 82 2nd class; 1,644 emigrants
- Sensors & processing systems: by 1914: submarine signalling; by 1926: wireless direction finding
- Notes: sister ship: Reina Victoria-Eugenia

SS Infanta Isabel de Borbon was a steam ocean liner and mail ship launched in 1912 in Scotland and operated by the Compañía Transatlántica Española (CTE). She and her sister ship Reina Victoria-Eugenia represented a significant modernisation of CTE's fleet of aging and obsolescent ships.

After the Second Spanish Republic was declared in 1931 Infanta Isabel de Borbon was renamed Uruguay. In 1932 she was laid up and in 1934 the Republic converted her into a prison ship.

In 1939 a Nationalist air attack on the Port of Barcelona sank Uruguay at her moorings. After the Nationalist defeat of the Second Republic her wreck was raised and scrapped.

== Building ==
William Denny and Brothers built Infanta Isabel de Borbon at Dumbarton in Scotland, launching her on 29 September 1912 and completing her on 15 March 1913. At the same time Swan, Hunter and Wigham Richardson built her sister ship Reina Victoria-Eugenia, and there were significant technical differences between the two.

Denny's based Infanta Isabel de Borbon's propulsion on that of the refrigerated cargo liner Otaki which they had launched in 1908. Otaki was the first ship in the World to be propelled by a combination of reciprocating steam engines and steam turbines. Otaki had three screws. Her port and starboard screws were each powered by a triple-expansion engine. Exhaust steam from their low-pressure cylinders fed a single low-pressure turbine amidships that drove her middle screw.

Harland and Wolff had adopted the same engine combination for White Star Line's Laurentic, launched in 1908, and for the Olympic-class ocean liners, the first to of which were launched in 1910 and 1911. CTE ordered a similar combination of two triple-expansion engines and one low-pressure turbine for Infanta Isabel de Borbon. She had three screws, with the middle one powered by a turbine.

Infanta Isabel de Borbon could go astern, slowly forward or manoeuvre using only her piston engines. For higher speeds she could use her turbine as well, increasing both her power and her fuel efficiency. The combined power of her two piston engines plus her turbine was rated at 700 NHP. On her sea trials Infanta Isabel de Borbon achieved 18.64 knots (34.52 km/h).

Infanta Isabel de Borbon had berths for 1,826 passengers: 100 first class, 82 second class and 1,644 emigrants.

The ship was equipped for wireless telegraphy and submarine signalling. Her wireless operated on the standard 300 and 600 metre wavelengths. Her call sign was EDI. CTE registered her at Barcelona. Her code letters were HPBG.

== Service ==
CTE's liner services linked Italy and Spain with Latin America. On 12 March 1913 Reina Victoria-Eugenia started her maiden voyage from Barcelona via Malaga, Cádiz, Tenerife and Montevideo to Buenos Aires. Infanta Isabel de Borbon followed on 4 April.

In the First World War both Infanta Isabel de Borbon and Reina Victoria-Eugenia seem to have made some trips New York. On 26 August 1914 Infanta Isabel de Borbon left Barcelona for New York with all of her available berths taken by US citizens returning home because of the outbreak of war. However, their scheduled service remained between Spain and the Río de la Plata.

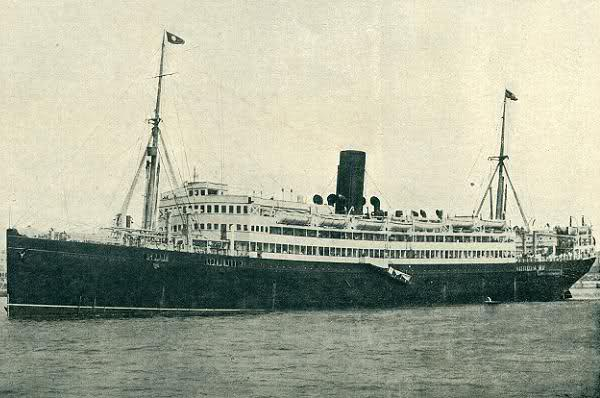
Infanta Isabel de Borbon in 1919

After the war the two ships reverted to sailing between Spain and the Río de la Plata. For a time their route was revised to include additional calls at Almería and Rio de Janeiro.

The two ships were CTE's premier passenger liners until the Sociedad Española de Construcción Naval (SECN) built the 10,551 GRT Alfonso XIII and 10,883 GRT Cristóbal Colón in 1923. They were joined by the slightly smaller Juan Sebastian Elcano and Marques de Comillas in 1928.

By 1926 Infanta Isabel de Borbon was equipped with wireless direction finding. After the Second Spanish Republic was declared in 1931, CTE renamed those of its ships that it had named after members of the Spanish royal family. Infanta Isabel de Borbon became Uruguay and Reina Victoria-Eugenia became Argentina.

== Prison ship ==
The Spanish government had subsidised CTE to provide a mail service between Spain, Uruguay and Argentina. In 1932 the Republican government withdrew the mail subsidy so on 8 May CTE withdrew the service and laid up Argentina and Uruguay at Barcelona.

By 1934 Uruguay's code letters and three-letter wireless call sign had been superseded by the call sign EAFG. Also in 1934, the Republican government requisitioned Uruguay to be a prison ship.

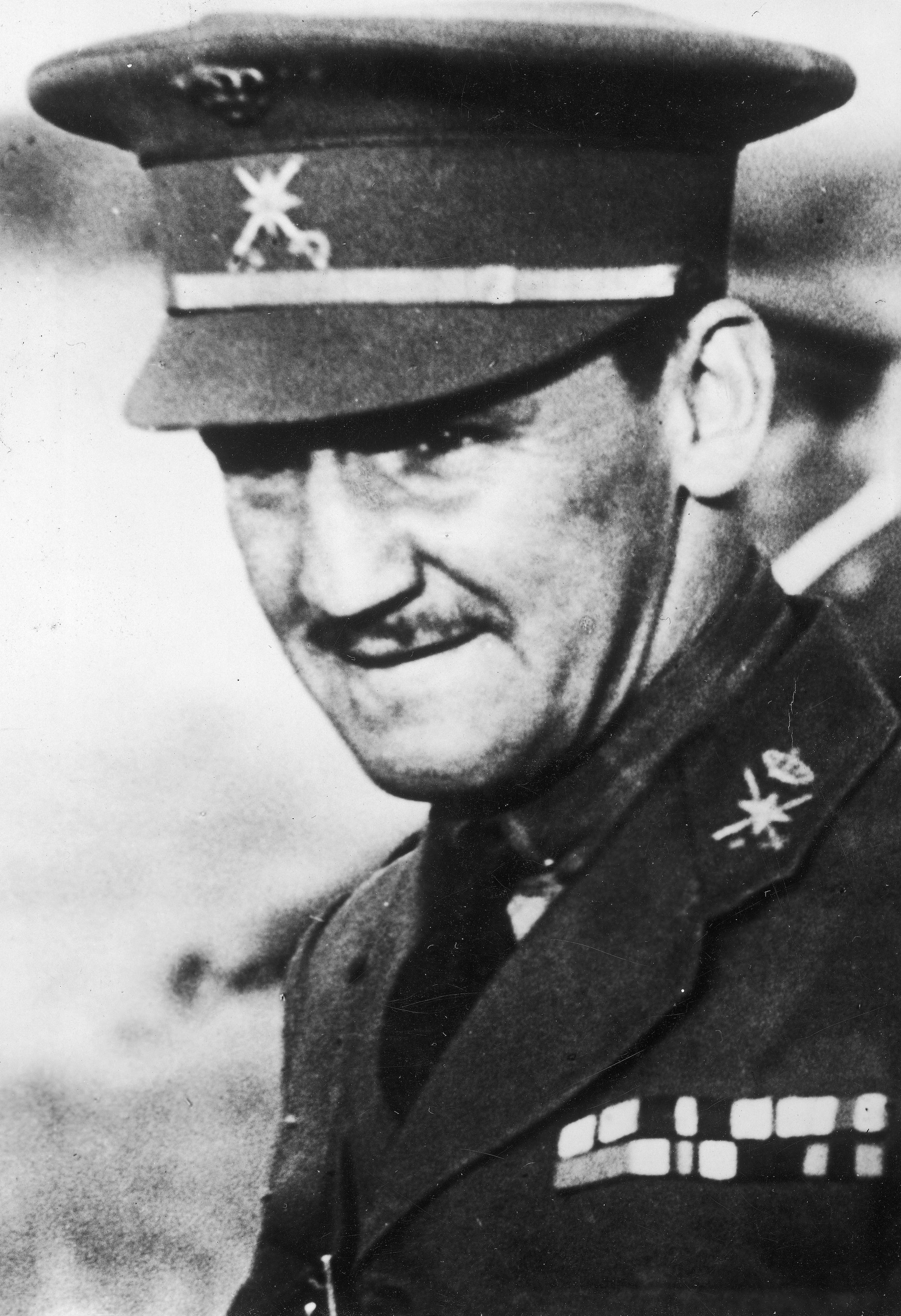
Republicans briefly imprisoned the Nationalist general Manuel Goded aboard Uruguay before trying him for treason

Argentina and Uruguay were still in Barcelona when the Spanish Civil War began in July 1936. On 11 August, Republicans captured a Nationalist general, Manuel Goded, whose forces had tried to capture Barcelona. They briefly imprisoned Goded aboard Uruguay. The next day he was tried for treason, and was executed by firing squad at Montjuïc Castle.

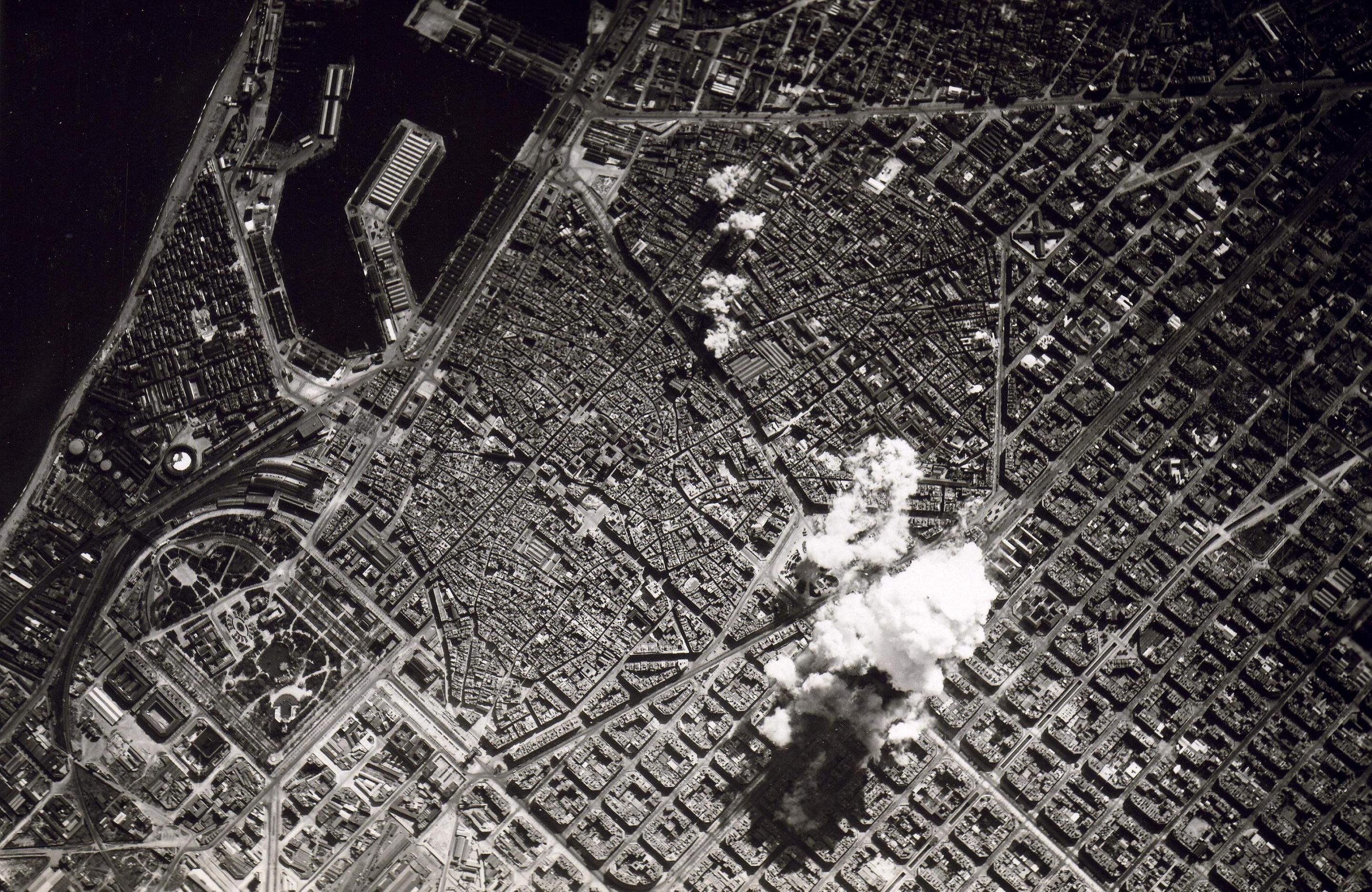
Regia Aeronautica photo of Barcelona being bombed in March 1938. The Port of Barcelona is upper left.

In January 1939 Nationalist troops were closing in on Barcelona and their air force bombed the city. Nationalist air raids damaged Argentina from 16 January and both ships on 23 January, when Uruguay was sunk at her moorings.

Barcelona fell on 26 January and the Second Republic surrendered on 1 April. The Nationalists raised Uruguay's wreck and scrapped it. Sources disagree as to whether she was raised on 26 July 1939 and scrapped in 1940 or raised in 1940 and scrapped in Valencia in 1942.

== Bibliography ==
- Dunn, Laurence (1973). Merchant Ships of the World in Colour 1910–1929. London: Blandford Press Ltd. ISBN 0-7137-0569-8.
- Harnack, Edwin P (1930) [1903]. All About Ships & Shipping (3rd ed.). London: Faber and Faber.
- Lloyd's Register of Shipping. Vol. II.—Steamers. London: Lloyd's Register of Shipping. 1914 – via Internet Archive.
- Lloyd's Register of Shipping. Vol. II.—Steamers and Motorships. London: Lloyd's Register of Shipping. 1926 – via Internet Archive.
- Lloyd's Register of Shipping (PDF). Vol. II.—Steamers and Motorships of 300 Tons Gross and Over. London: Lloyd's Register of Shipping. 1934 – via Southampton City Council.
- The Marconi Press Agency Ltd (1914). The Year Book of Wireless Telegraphy and Telephony. London: The Marconi Press Agency Ltd.
