= Rochambeau bomb plot =

Abortive WW1 sabotage attack

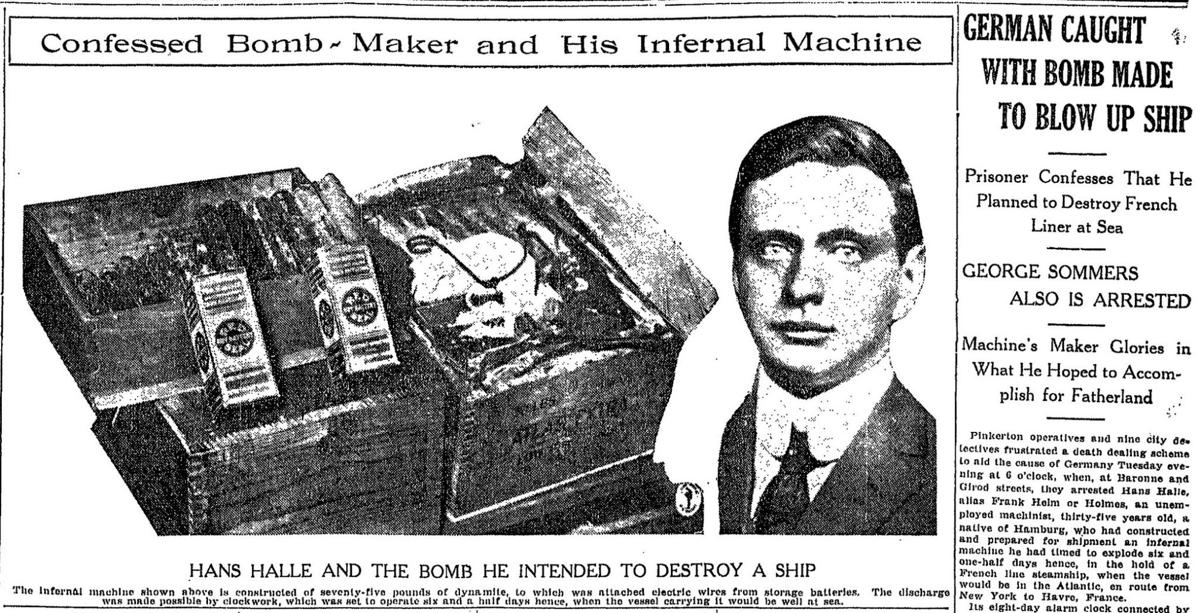
- US media coverage of the Rochambeau bomb plot
- Location: New Orleans; New York City; Rochambeau
- Attack type: Sabotage
- Perpetrator: Imperial German agents
- Motive: sabotage

The Rochambeau bomb plot was an attempt by four Germans, Frank Helon (a.k.a. Hans Hellar), George Summers, George Brinkman and Peter Langlaan to bomb an Allied ship while it was steaming across the Atlantic. The plot was foiled when Peter Langlaan changed his mind after thinking about the innocent passengers who might be hurt in the attack. This was a lone wolf attack, with no known contact with Imperial Germany's expansive spy network in America.

== Background ==
World War I broke out in August 1914. While the United States was initially neutral in the conflict, one of its biggest immigrant groups was German-speaking parts of Imperial Germany and Austro-Hungarian Empire. Some of these German immigrants were angered by American trade to Germany's enemies the Allies or Entente Powers. One of the plotters said he was inspired by the McNamara brother's Los Angeles Times bombing and that he wanted “to do something to help the fatherland.”

== Plot ==
Frank Helon (a.k.a. Hans Hellar) built the bomb, a package containing 75 pounds (34 kg) of dynamite connected with wires set to explode six and one-half days after it was started. The other plotters were to help him express to ship the bomb from New Orleans to New York City and on to the targeted ship, Rochambeau. George Brinkman, the proprietor of New Orleans' Faust hotel, was to use his contacts via the hotel to ship the package. The timer was to be started in New Orleans and it was hoped that in six and one-half days that it would reach New York, be placed aboard Rochambeau and detonate when the ship was far from land.

== Arrest ==
One of the plotters Peter Langlaan broke down near the time the package was to be shipped. While he liked the idea of destroying the ships he couldn't get past killing the innocent passengers and crew. Overcome with dread he went to the police. It was then that the other plotters were arrested.

== Bibliography ==
Notes

References

- "Police Flustrate Plot to Blow Up French or British Steamship". The Anderson Daily Intelligencer. Anderson, South Carolina: William Banks. December 23, 1914. pp. 1–8. ISSN 2166-9651. OCLC 27828051.
- "Plot to blow up French steamer is halted by police". Bisbee Daily Review. Bisbee, Cochise, Arizona: W.B. Kelly. December 23, 1914. pp. 1–6. ISSN 2157-3255. OCLC 11363144.
- "Police Frustrate German Attempt To Blow Up Ship". The Birmingham Age-Herald. Birmingham, Jefferson, Alabama: Age-Herald Co. December 23, 1914. pp. 1–12. ISSN 2692-6318. OCLC 12607279.
