= SS Carlos de Eizaguirre =

Steam passenger and cargo liner sunk during World War I

Coordinates: 33°46′S 17°59′E

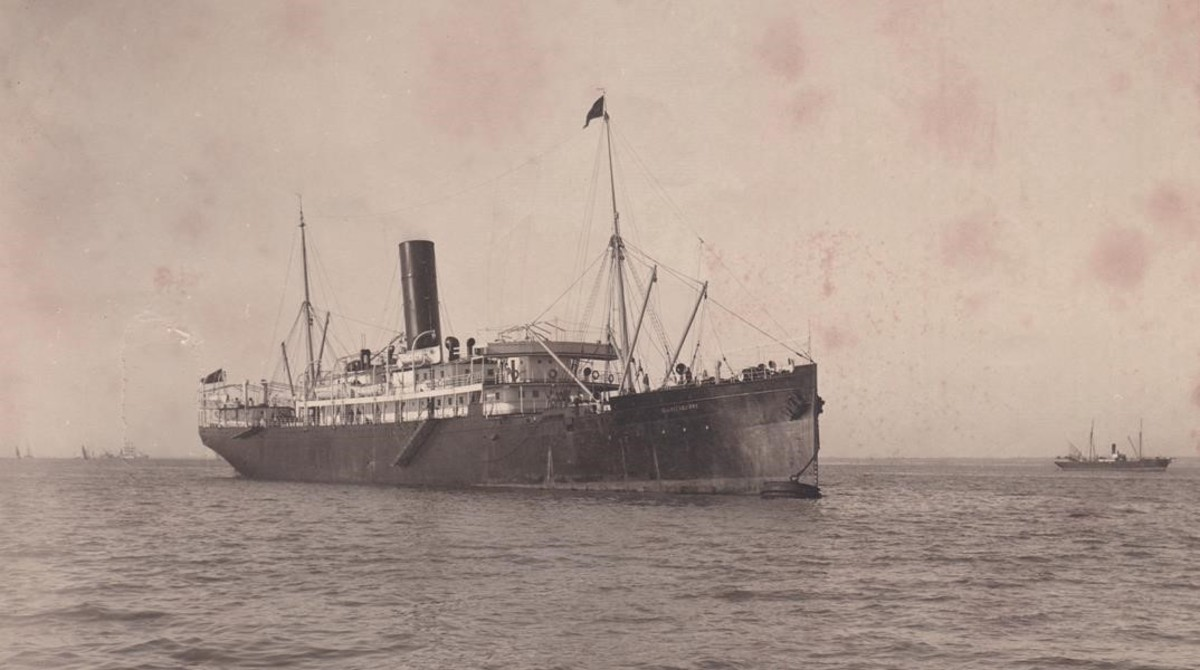
- Carlos de Eizaguirre between 1910 and 1914

History
- Name: Léopoldville (1903–08); Landana (1908–10); Carlos de Eizaguirre (1910–17)
- Namesake: Léopoldville (1903–08); Lândana (1908–10)
- Owner: Cie Maritime Belge du Congo (1904–08); African Steamship Co (1908–10); Cía Transatlántica Española (1910–17)
- Port of registry: (Belgium) Antwerp (1904–08); (United Kingdom) London (1908–10); (Spain) Barcelona (1910–17)
- Builder: Sir Raylton Dixon & Co
- Yard number: 502
- Launched: 5 December 1903
- Completed: April 1904
- Fate: Mined 26 May 1917

General characteristics
- Tonnage: 4,152 GRT 2,690 NRT
- Length: 375.3 ft (114.4 m)
- Beam: 47.0 ft (14.3 m)
- Depth: 23.2 ft (7.1 m)
- Installed power: 589 NHP
- Propulsion: twin triple-expansion engines; twin screws
- Speed: 14 knots (26 km/h)
- Capacity: passengers: 85 1st class; 45 2nd class; 144 steerage
- Crew: 97
- Notes: sister ship: Zungeru

SS Carlos de Eizaguirre was a steam passenger and cargo liner of the Compañía Transatlántica Española (CTE). She was launched in 1903 in England as Léopoldville for the Compagnie Maritime Belge du Congo (CMBC), sold in 1908 to the African Steamship Company, which renamed her Landana, and sold in 1910 to CTE who renamed her Carlos de Eizaguirre after one of its former directors.

On 26 May 1917 a mine sank Carlos de Eizaguirre off the coast of South Africa, causing the deaths of 134 people. There were only 25 survivors. The UK Admiralty admitted mining the area but the United Kingdom denied responsibility and rejected a Spanish claim for liability.

== Building ==
Sir Raylton Dixon and Company built Léopoldville at the Cleveland Dockyard in Middlesbrough on the River Tees, launching her on 5 December 1903 and completing her in 1904. She had a pair of three-cylinder triple-expansion engines, built by the Wallsend Slipway & Engineering Company, which drove her twin screws.

She was the third of six CMBC ships to be named after the capital of the Congo Free State, which in 1908 became the Belgian Congo. She was also the first of a pair of sister ships that Sir Raylton Dixon and Co built for CMBC. Her sister was Zungeru, which was launched on 19 March 1904 and completed that July.

== Changes of owner and name ==
In 1908 CMBC sold Léopoldville to the African Steamship Company, a UK shipping company that was one of the Elder Dempster Lines. The African Steamship Co renamed her Landana after the town of Lândana in the Cabinda exclave of Portuguese Angola.

In 1910 the African Steamship Co sold Landana to CTE, which renamed her Carlos de Eizaguirre after Juan Carlos de Bailly Eizaguirre (1817–1900), a Spanish banker who had been a CTE director.

On 28 October 1910 the ship underwent sea trials before CTE bought her. She averaged 14.48 knots (26.82 km/h) with the current in her favour and 13.9 knots (25.7 km/h) against the current. CTE had her passenger accommodation refitted at Cádiz. CTE put Carlos de Eizaguirre on its route between Barcelona and Manila via the Suez Canal and Singapore.

== Loss ==
In the First World War the UK and France closed the Suez Canal to non-Allied shipping. CTE therefore re-routed its Barcelona – Manila service via Las Palmas, Cape Town and Durban.

On 21 April 1917 Carlos de Eizaguirre left Barcelona carrying 35 passengers. She called at Cádiz, where she embarked 15 passengers and left on 27 April. She reached Las Palmas on 30 April, where she bunkered before leaving on 5 May. After leaving Las Palmas she carried 50 passengers, including 11 or 12 women and five children aged between three and five years.

On the evening of 25 May Carlos de Eizaguirre was off the Atlantic coast of South Africa, steaming at a reduced speed of 5 knots (9 km/h) because there was a heavy sea as her Master, Fermín Luzárraga, did not want to reach Cape Town before morning. At 0330 hrs on Saturday 26 May there was an explosion on the starboard side of the ship's number two hold, breaking her back. The wireless operator transmitted a distress signal and Captain Luzárraga gave the order to abandon ship.

Carlos de Eizaguirre sank in only five minutes. Only one of her eight boats, lifeboat number six, was launched before she sank. It contained 24 survivors: the Second Officer, an apprentice, two passengers and 20 crewmen. Other passengers had boarded the two boats farthest aft, but the ship sank before they could be launched.

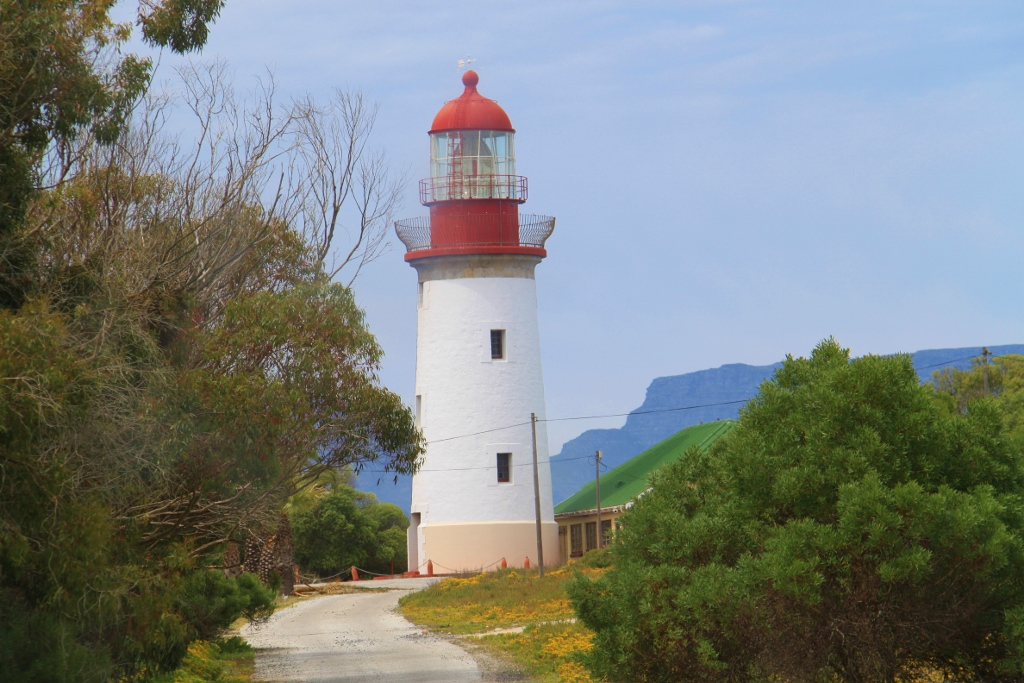
Robben Island lighthouse, whose light guided survivors in lifeboat number six

Led by the Second Officer, Luis Lazaga Gómez, the crew rowed toward the light of Robben Island lighthouse and kept baling the boat as she shipped water. The heavy sea made it dangerous to approach the shore, but a tug took the lifeboat in tow and brought it to land at about 1330 hrs.

There was one other survivor. Alejandro Fernández, a member of the engine room crew, had helped to launch boat number six but had been unable to board her. Fernández jumped into the sea and swam for about two hours until he found a large piece of wooden wreckage from one of the ship's coal bunkers. After the lifeboat reached Robben Island, tugs were sent to search for the other lifeboats but they did not see Fernández.

On the morning of Sunday 27 May, Fernández sighted the coaster Langebaan and hailed her for help. Langebaan rescued him about 32 or 33 hours after Carlos de Eizaguirre was sunk.

50 passengers and 84 crew, including Captain Luzárraga, were killed. Allegedly sharks ate some of the victims. The dead included the Spanish Consul at Colombo.

== Aftermath ==
11 hours after the sinking CTE received the news by telegram. Privately CTE's management admitted that a mine was the most likely cause, but the company did not publish the news because it lacked insurance against acts of war, and was not sure it could meet potential claims of loss and damage. Instead CTE sent coded messages to its offices that said: Termidor permutar transformado riel cerca de joya Robben ("'Eizaguirre' totally lost near Robben Island").

On 28 May rumours of the sinking began to reach Barcelona. One of CTE's managers decided "we shall treat this with all reserve and we shall say that we are dealing with a normal accident". When news was finally published in the press it used the shipping company's version of events. In an internal company memo it was stated that "given the press censorship regime of the government, we can abstain of publishing details of the probable cause of the accident".

Therefore, La Vanguardia and El Noticiero Universal published that "for the most part opinions coincide in not admitting the possibility that the ship collided with a drifting mine taking into account the enormous distance between the site of the accident and the mined areas. In general, it is believed that the Eizaguirre must have found itself in one of those storms that are currently occurring at the Cape of Good Hope, foundering or striking against something underwater".

On 9 March The Times had reported that the First Lord of the Admiralty, Edward Carson, stated that the Royal Navy had mined the area. On 2 June CTE representatives met the Spanish Prime Minister, Manuel García Prieto, in Madrid, privately admitted to him that they suspected the ship had been mined, and asked him to make a claim against the UK government. The UK Admiralty denied it, and alleged that the German merchant raider SMS Wolf, which had been in the area four months earlier, must have laid the mine.

== Bibliography ==
- Molina Font, Julio (2002). Cádiz y el vapor-correo de Filipinas "Carlos de Eizaguirre", 1904–1917: historia de un naufragio. Cádiz: Servicio Publicaciones de la Universidad de Cádiz. ISBN 84-7786-776-3.
