= SS Reina Victoria-Eugenia =

Steam ocean liner, built in England for Spanish service to the River Plate

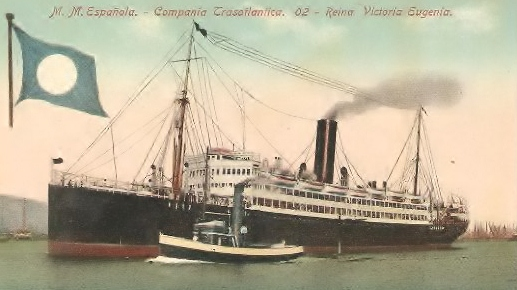
- 1914 postcard of Reina Victoria-Eugenia

History

Spain
- Name: 1912: Reina Victoria-Eugenia; 1931: Argentina
- Namesake: 1912: Queen Victoria Eugenie; 1931: Argentina
- Owner: Compañía Transatlántica Española
- Operator: Cía Transatlántica Española
- Port of registry: Barcelona
- Route: Barcelona – Buenos Aires
- Builder: Swan, Hunter & Wigham Richardson, Low Walker
- Yard number: 884
- Launched: 26 September 1912
- Completed: February 1913
- Maiden voyage: 12 March 1913
- Identification: 1913: code letters JFGW; by 1914: call sign EDU; by 1934: call sign EAIE
- Fate: Sunk by air attack, raised, scrapped

General characteristics
- Type: ocean liner
- Tonnage: 10,137 GRT, 5,564 NRT
- Length: 480.0 ft (146.3 m)
- Beam: 61.3 ft (18.7 m)
- Draught: 25.0 ft (7.6 m)
- Depth: 32.7 ft (10.0 m)
- Decks: 3
- Installed power: 1,484 NHP
- Propulsion: 2 × triple-expansion steam engines; 2 × low-pressure steam turbines; 4 × screws
- Speed: maximum: 18.6 knots (34.4 km/h); cruising: 16 knots (30 km/h)
- Capacity: 200 × 1st class; 46 × "interchangeable" class; 100 × 2nd class; 80 × 3rd class; 1,640 × 3rd & emigrant classes
- Crew: 250
- Sensors & processing systems: by 1914: submarine signalling; by 1926: wireless direction finding
- Armament: passive provision for four naval guns
- Notes: sister ship: Infanta Isabel de Borbon

SS Reina Victoria-Eugenia was a steam ocean liner and mail ship launched in 1912 in England and operated by the Compañía Transatlántica Española (CTE). She and her sister ship Infanta Isabel de Borbon represented a significant modernisation of CTE's fleet of ageing and obsolescent ships.

After the Second Spanish Republic was declared in 1931 Reina Victoria-Eugenia was renamed Argentina. She was laid up from 1932.

In 1939 a Nationalist air attack on the Port of Barcelona sank Argentina at her moorings. Her wreck had been raised by 1940 and was scrapped in 1945.

== Building ==
Swan, Hunter & Wigham Richardson built Reina Victoria-Eugenia at its Neptune Yard in Low Walker, England, launching her on 26 September 1912 and completing her in February 1913. At the same time William Denny and Brothers built her sister ship Infanta Isabel de Borbon, and there were significant technical differences between the two.

Denny's had built the refrigerated cargo liner Otaki which they had launched in 1908. Otaki was the first ship in the World to be propelled by a combination of reciprocating steam engines and steam turbines. Otaki had three screws. Her port and starboard screws were each powered by a triple-expansion engine. Exhaust steam from their low-pressure cylinders fed a single low-pressure turbine amidships that drove her middle screw.

Harland and Wolff had adopted the same engine combination for White Star Line's Laurentic, launched in 1908, and for the Olympic-class ocean liners, the first two of which were launched in 1910 and 1911. CTE ordered a similar combination of triple-expansion engines and low-pressure turbine for Infanta Isabel de Borbon and Reina Victoria-Eugenia. Denny's gave Infanta Isabel de Borbon the same three-screw combination as Otaki.

However, Swan, Hunter, experimenting with "a self-propelled model", had developed a preference for a four-screw arrangement, with the piston engines driving the two middle screws and turbines driving the two outer screws. In 1910–11 Chantiers de l'Atlantique had put this idea into practice when it built the liner Rochambeau for Compagnie Générale Transatlantique. CGT reported favourable results to Swan, Hunter. CTE accepted this arrangement for Reina Victoria-Eugenia.

The two sister ships for CTE differed slightly in appearance. Reina Victoria-Eugenia had a taller funnel, whereas Infanta Isabel de Borbon had cowl tops on her king-posts.

Reina Victoria-Eugenia was equipped for wireless telegraphy and submarine signalling. Her wireless operated on the standard 300 and 600 metre wavelengths. By 1914 her call sign was EDU.

Swan, Hunter built Reina Victoria-Eugenia with berths for 2,066 passengers: 200 first-class, 46 "interchangeable" class, 100 second class, 80 third class and 1,640 third and emigrant classes. Her public saloons were decorated in various historicist styles including Louis XVI, Neo-Georgian and Jacobean Revival.

Swan, Hunter made passive provision for Reina Victoria-Eugenia to be armed with four naval guns to enable her to be converted into an armed merchant cruiser.

CTE registered Reina Victoria-Eugenia at Barcelona. Her code letters were JFGW.

== Performance ==
Reina Victoria-Eugenia's sea trials were in February 1913, in the North Sea near the mouth of the River Tyne. Her contract required her to maintain 17.5 knots (32.4 km/h) for eight hours when half-laden, and 16 knots (30 km/h) for 24 hours when fully laden. On 7 February, half-laden and displacing 10,181 tons, she averaged 18.12 knots (33.56 km/h) despite bad weather. On 15 and 16 February, fully laden and displacing 13,229 tons, she averaged 16.10 knots (29.82 km/h) on her fuel consumption trials.

Her speed trials used the measured mile off St Mary's Island. Fog reduced visibility, so the trials had to be held relatively close to the shore to be able to see the mile posts. This meant that the ship was steaming in waters only about 75 feet (23 m) deep. Nevertheless, on her best run she achieved 18.6 knots (34.4 km/h). It was reported that once the ship reached Spain, she achieved higher speeds in deeper water and better weather off Cádiz.

== Service ==
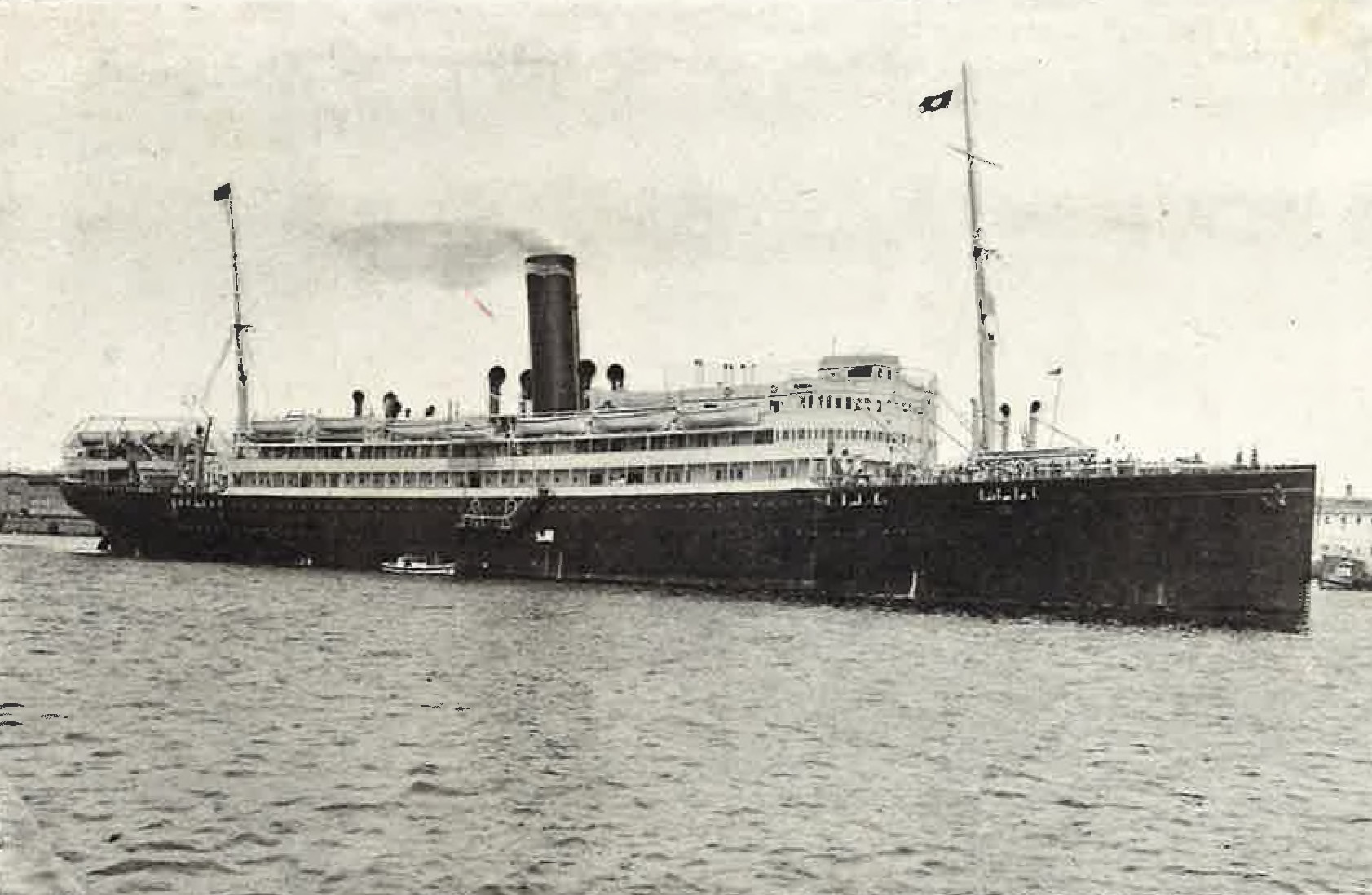
Reina Victoria-Eugenia in 1914

CTE's liner services linked Italy and Spain with Latin America. On 12 March 1913 Reina Victoria-Eugenia started her maiden voyage from Barcelona via Malaga, Cádiz, Tenerife and Montevideo to Buenos Aires. Infanta Isabel de Borbon followed on 4 April.

In the First World War both Infanta Isabel de Borbon and Reina Victoria-Eugenia seem to have made some trips to New York. However, their scheduled service remained between Spain and the Río de la Plata.

During the First World War the Entente Allies did not allow neutral ships to carry men of military age who were citizens of the Axis powers. In May 1918 Reina Victoria-Eugenia was en route from Tenerife to Spain when the Royal Navy forced her to divert to Gibraltar for examination because the British Admiralty had been alerted that there were German men of military age among her passengers. Authorities in Gibraltar found a German sailor from the auxiliary cruiser Kaiser Wilhelm der Grosse who had been interned on the Canary Islands since his ship was sunk in August 1914, and who was travelling under Spanish armed escort. Also aboard was a German professor.

The UK authorities allowed the German sailor to continue his journey once they were satisfied that he was under armed guard. But UK Foreign Office asked the Spanish government to give notice of future transfers of Axis internees by sea between Spanish territories, to prevent any risk of misunderstanding.

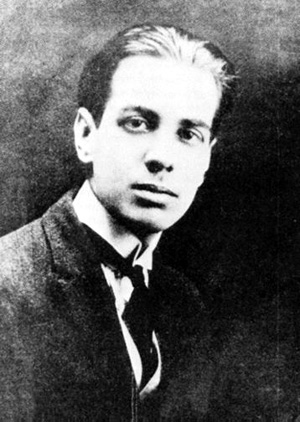
Jorge Luis Borges in 1921, the year before he sailed aboard Reina Victoria-Eugenia

After the war Infanta Isabel de Borbon and Reina Victoria-Eugenia reverted to sailing between Spain and the Río de la Plata. For a time their route was revised to include additional calls at Almería and Rio de Janeiro. The Argentinian writer Jorge Luis Borges travelled aboard Reina Victoria-Eugenia in 1922.

The two ships were CTE's premier passenger liners until the Sociedad Española de Construcción Naval (SECN) built the 10,551 GRT Alfonso XIII and 10,883 GRT Cristóbal Colón in 1923. They were joined by the slightly smaller Juan Sebastian Elcano and Marques de Comillas in 1928.

By 1926 Reina Victoria-Eugenia was equipped with wireless direction finding. After the Second Spanish Republic was declared in 1931, CTE renamed those of its ships that it had named after members of the Spanish royal family. Infanta Isabel de Borbon became Uruguay and Reina Victoria-Eugenia became Argentina.

== Fate ==
The Spanish government had subsidised CTE to provide a mail service between Spain, Uruguay and Argentina. In 1932 the Republican government withdrew the mail subsidy so on 8 May CTE withdrew the service and laid up Argentina and Uruguay at Barcelona.

By 1934 Argentina's code letters and original three-letter call sign had been superseded by the four-letter call sign EAIE.

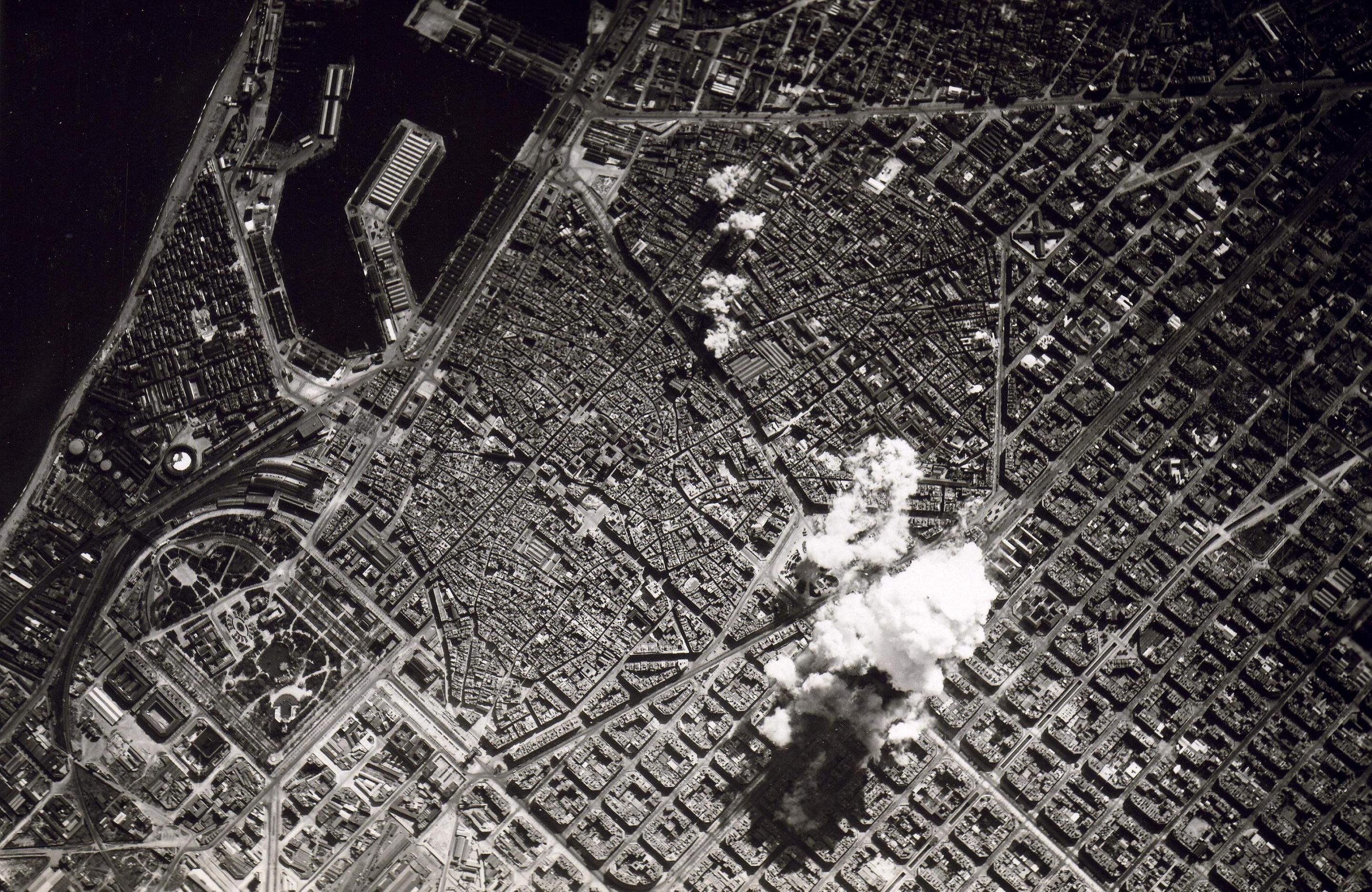
Regia Aeronautica photo of Barcelona being bombed in March 1938. The Port of Barcelona is upper left.

Argentina and Uruguay were still in Barcelona when the Spanish Civil War began in 1936. In January 1939 Nationalist troops were closing in on Barcelona and their air force bombed the city. Nationalist air raids damaged Argentina from 16 January and both ships on 23 January. Both ships were sunk at their moorings.

Barcelona fell on 26 January and the Second Republic surrendered on 1 April. By 1940 the Nationalists had raised Argentina's wreck. She was scrapped in 1945 in Bilbao.

== Bibliography ==
- Dunn, Laurence (1973). Merchant Ships of the World in Colour 1910–1929. London: Blandford Press Ltd. ISBN 0-7137-0569-8.
- Harnack, Edwin P (1930) [1903]. All About Ships & Shipping (3rd ed.). London: Faber and Faber.
- Lloyd's Register of Shipping. Vol. II.—Steamers. London: Lloyd's Register of Shipping. 1914 – via Internet Archive.
- Lloyd's Register of Shipping. Vol. II.—Steamers and Motorships. London: Lloyd's Register of Shipping. 1926 – via Internet Archive.
- Lloyd's Register of Shipping (PDF). Vol. II.—Steamers and Motorships of 300 Tons Gross and Over. London: Lloyd's Register of Shipping. 1934 – via Southampton City Council.
- Lloyd's Register of Shipping (PDF). Vol. I.—Steamers and Motorships of 300 Tons Trawlers, Tugs, Dredgers, etc. London: Lloyd's Register of Shipping. 1940 – via Southampton City Council.
- Lloyd's Register of Shipping (PDF). Vol. I.—Steamers and Motorships of 300 Tons Gross and Over. London: Lloyd's Register of Shipping. 1945 – via Southampton City Council.
- The Marconi Press Agency Ltd (1914). The Year Book of Wireless Telegraphy and Telephony. London: The Marconi Press Agency Ltd.
- Sothern, JWM (1916) [1906]. The Marine Steam Turbine (Fourth ed.). London: Crosby, Lockwood and Son.
