= Charlie Rose (footballer) =

English footballer (1872–1949)

Personal information
- Full name: Charlie Herbert Rose
- Date of birth: 19 March 1872
- Place of birth: Derby, England
- Date of death: 1949 (aged 76–77)
- Position: Inside forward

Senior career*
Years	Team	Apps	(Gls)
1889–1890	Derby St Luke's		
1890–1891	Derby Midland		
1891–1893	Derby County	5	(0)
1894–1895	Kettering		
1896–1899	Ilkeston Town		
1899–1900	Loughborough	23	(2)
1900–1901	Ilkeston Town		
1901–1904	Whitwick White Cross		
1904	Ilkeston United		
Total		28	(2)
- * Club domestic league appearances and goals

Charlie Herbert Rose (19 March 1872–1949) was an English footballer who played in the Football League for Derby County and Loughborough.
