= SMS Wolf (1916) =

Armed merchant raider

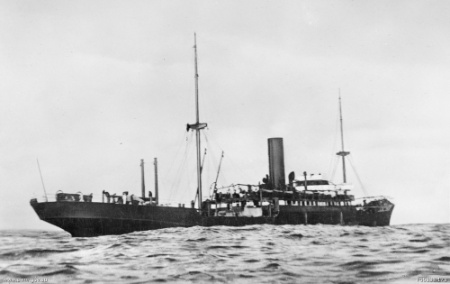
- Hilfskreuzer SMS Wolf

History
- Name: D/S Wachtfels (1913–1916); SMS Wolf (1916–1918); Antinous (1918–1931)
- Owner: DDG Hansa (1913–1916); Kaiserliche Marine (1916–1918); Cie. des Messageries Maritimes (1918–1931)
- Operator: DDG Hansa (1913–1916); Kaiserliche Marine (1916–1918); Cie. des Messageries Maritimes (1918–1931)
- Port of registry: (Germany) Bremen (1913–1916); (German Empire) (1916–1918); (France) (1918–1931)
- Builder: Flensburger Schiffbau Gesellschaft
- Launched: 8 March 1913
- Commissioned: 16 May 1916
- Out of service: 1918
- Fate: Scrapped 1931

General characteristics
- Tonnage: 5,809 GRT
- Displacement: 11,200 tons
- Length: 135 m (442 ft 11 in)
- Beam: 17.10 m (56 ft 1 in)
- Draught: 7.90 m (25 ft 11 in)
- Propulsion: 1 shaft VTE steam engine, 3 boilers
- Speed: 11 knots (20 km/h; 13 mph)
- Complement: 348
- Armament: 8 × 15 cm (5.9 in) guns; 3 × 5.2 cm (2.0 in) SK L/55 guns; 4 × 50 cm (20 in) torpedo tubes, 465 mines
- Aircraft carried: 1 Friedrichshafen FF.33 seaplane

SMS Wolf (formerly the Hansa freighter Wachtfels) was an armed merchant raider or auxiliary cruiser of the Imperial German Navy in World War I. She was the fourth ship of the Imperial Navy bearing this name (and is therefore often referred to in Germany as Wolf IV), following two gunboats and another auxiliary cruiser that was decommissioned without seeing action.

== Description and history ==
As a commerce raider, the Wolf was equipped with six 15 cm (5.9 in) guns, three 5.2 cm (2.0 in) SK L/55 guns and several smaller caliber weapons as well as four torpedo tubes. She also carried over 450 mines to be dropped outside enemy ports; she laid minefields in the Indian Ocean and off Australia's southern coast, sinking several ships. Her commander was Fregattenkapitän (Commander) Karl August Nerger who was in charge until her return to Kiel, Germany in February 1918.

The Wolf had not been designed for speed and her top speed was a mere 11 knots (20 km/h). Her advantages included deception (fake funnel and masts which could be erected or lowered to change her appearance), false sides which kept her weapons hidden until the last possible moment, and a range of over 32,000 nmi (59,000 km) thanks to a coal bunker capacity of 8,000 tons (assuming a cruise speed of 8 knots, burning 35 tons of coal daily).

On 30 November 1916 the Wolf left her home port of Kiel with a crew of 348 men. Escorted by the SM U-66 from Skagerrak to the North Atlantic, she passed north of Scotland and turned south going around the Cape of Good Hope, where she laid some of her mines, into the Indian Ocean. She dropped mines at the harbors of Colombo and Bombay, then entered the waters of South Asia, Australia and New Zealand.

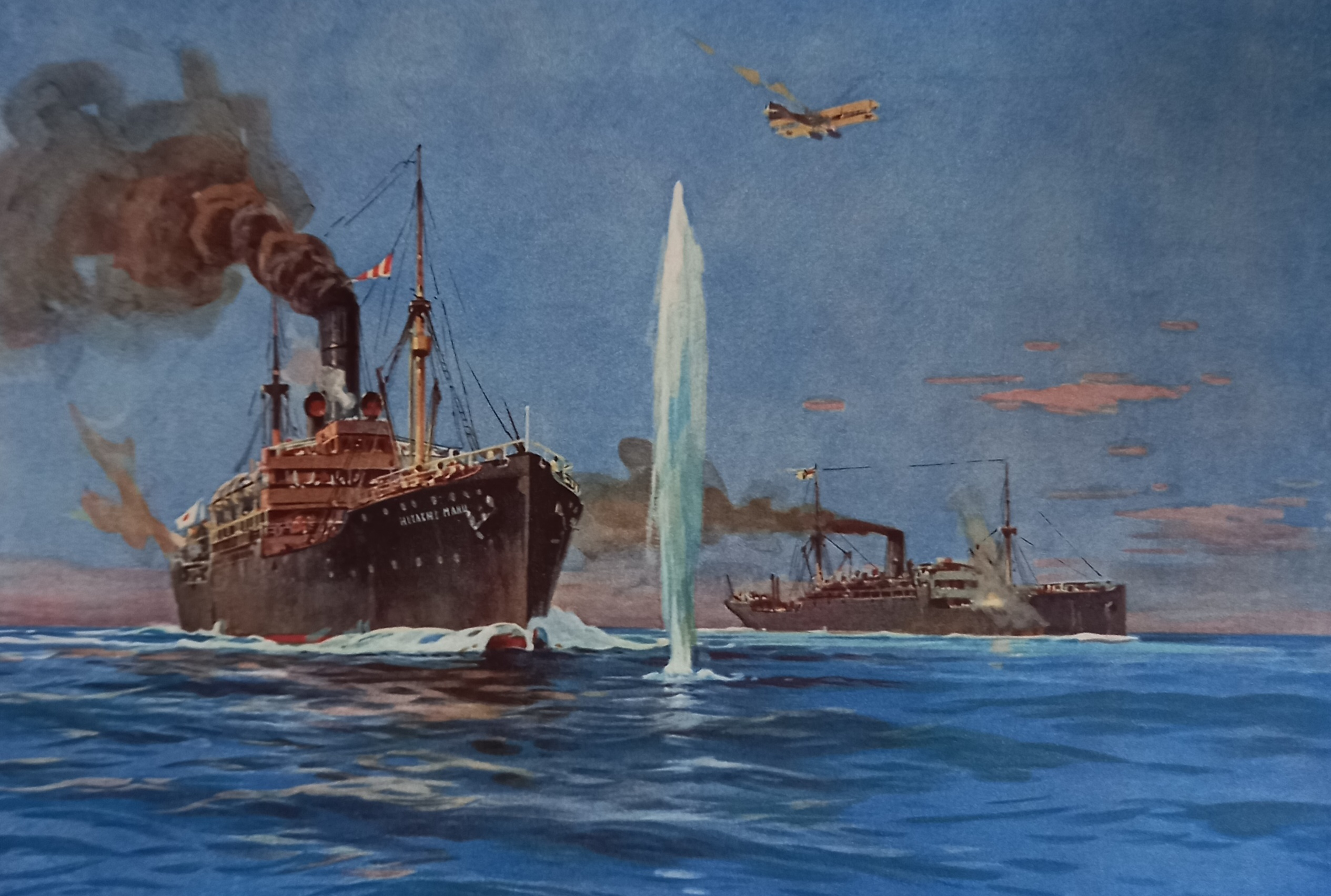
Der deutsche Hilfskreuzer WOLF bringt im Indischen Ozean den japanischen Dampfer HITACHI MARU auf.

With the help of the "Wölfchen" (Wolf Cub), a Friedrichshafen FF.33e two-seater seaplane, she located and seized enemy vessels and cargo ships. After transferring their crews and any valuable supplies (notably coal, but also essential metals of which the German war effort had much need) to the Wolf, she then sank the vessels. The Wolf destroyed 35 trading vessels and two war ships, altogether approximately 110,000 tons.

After 451 days at sea, she returned to her home port of Kiel on 24 February 1918 with 467 prisoners of war aboard. In addition she carried substantial quantities of rubber, copper, zinc, brass, silk, copra, cocoa, and other essential materials taken from her prizes. The Wolf, without support of any kind, had made the longest voyage of a warship during World War I. Captain Nerger was awarded the highest German decoration, the Pour le Mérite.

For the remainder of the war, Wolf was employed in the Baltic Sea. After the war she was ceded to France and sold to Compagnie des Messageries Maritimes of Paris, refitted and renamed Antinous. She was scrapped in 1931 in Italy.

A member of the crew was the young Theodor Plivier, who became later a revolutionary, communist, and famous author. In his first novel Des Kaisers Kulis (The emperor's coolies) he assimilates his experience on board the Wolf. The book was transformed in a theatrical play, too, and forbidden after the National Socialist Machtergreifung. Another crew member was Jakob Kinau, brother of author Gorch Fock – Kinau served as a Minenbootsmannsmaat on the Wolf. In his voyage diary, which was published in 1934 in the Quickborn-Verlag, Hamburg, he mentioned some details of a mutiny on board, which was not described in memoirs of other Wolf crew.

The SS Port Kembla was sunk off the coast of the South Island of New Zealand after hitting a mine laid by the Wolf.

== Summary of raiding history ==
In 15 months at sea, Wolf captured and sank 14 ships, totalling 38,391 GRT. She also laid minefields that sank another 13 ships, grossing a further 75,888 GRT. The heaviest loss was the Spanish mail steamer SS Carlos de Eizaguirre on the way from Cádiz to Manila. It struck a mine laid by Wolf near Cape Town and sank in only four minutes. The 134 dead included 117 men, 12 women and five children. 24 people survived.

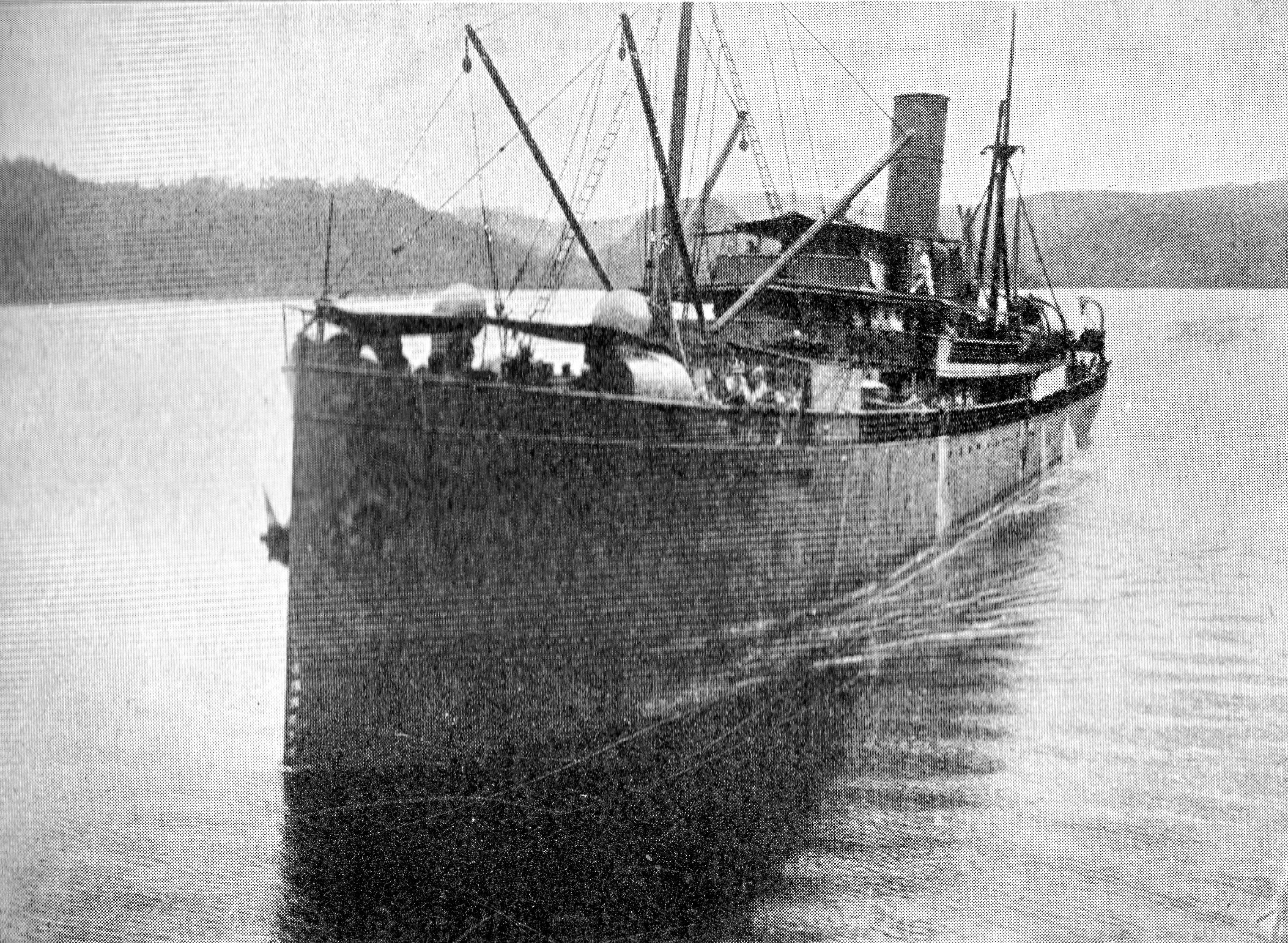
SS Matunga (ex Zweena) in August 1917

Ships sunk or captured by Wolf
Date	Ship	Type	Nationality	Tonnage GRT	Fate
27.1.17	Turritella, ex Gutenfels	Freighter	British (captured, ex German)	5.528	commissioned as Auxiliary Minelayer Iltis; scuttled to avoid capture 15.3.17
1.3.17	Jumna	Freighter	British	4,152	Sunk
11.3.17	Wordsworth	Freighter	British	3,509	Sunk
30.3.17	Dee	Sailing ship	British	1,169	Sunk
2.6.17	Wairuna	Freighter	British	3,947	Sunk
16.6.17	Winslow	Sailing ship	US	567	Sunk
9.7.17	Beluga	Sailing ship	US	507	Sunk
14.7.17	Encore	Sailing ship	US	651	Sunk
6.8.17	SS Matunga	Freighter	Australian	1,618	Sunk
26.9.17	Hitachi Maru	Freighter	Japanese	6,557	Captured. For over a month it was stripped of its silk, copper and coal before being scuttled among the Cargados Carajos Islands on 7 November 1917
10.11.17	Igotz Mendi	Freighter	Spanish	4,648	retained as prize; wrecked on Danish coast 24.2.18
30.11.17	John H Kirby	Sailing ship	US	1,296	Sunk
15.12.17	Marechal Davout	Sailing ship	French	2,192	Sunk
4.1.18	Storebror	Sailing ship	Norwegian	2,050	Sunk

Sunk by mines from Wolf
Date	Ship	Type	Nationality	Tonnage GRT	Location
26.1.17	Matheran	Freighter	British	7,654	Cape Town
12.2.17	Cilicia	Freighter	British	3,750	Cape Town
26.5.17	Carlos de Eizaguirre	Freighter	Spanish	4,350	Cape Town
10.8.17	City of Athens	Passenger Liner	British	5,604	Cape Town
17.2.17	Worcestershire	Freighter	British	7,175	Colombo
21.2.17	Perseus	Freighter	British	6,728	Colombo
16.6.17	Unkai Maru	Freighter	Japanese	2,143	Bombay
24.6.17	Mongolia	Freighter	British	9,505	Bombay
29.7.17	Okhla	Freighter	British	5,288	Bombay
17.11.17	Croxteth Hall	Freighter	British	5,872	Bombay
26.6.18	Wimmera	Freighter	Australian	3,622	New Zealand
6.7.17	Cumberland	Freighter	British	9,471	Australia
18.9.17	Port Kembla	Freighter	British	4,700	New Zealand

Damaged by mines from Wolf
Date	Ship	Type	Nationality	Tonnage GRT	Location
6.2.17	Tyndareus	Troopship	British	11,000	Cape Agulhas
11.6.17	City of Exeter	Passenger Liner	British	9,373	Bombay
26.8.17	Ghamo	Freighter	British	5,244	Cape Agulhas

In addition, on 6.2.17, the British troopship HMT Tyndareus was badly damaged by one of Wolf's mines off Cape Town and was only saved from sinking by skillful seamanship.

== Film ==
In February/March 1918 the Bild- und Filmamt (BUFA) produced the 13-minute silent movie S.M. Hilfskreuzer "Wolf", which was produced in Kiel. It shows the SMS Wolf's return to Kiel, Captain Nerger being awarded the Pour le Mérite, and various luminaries touring the ship. Scenes of various parts of the ship are shown, as well as footage of the prisoners captured during the voyage.

== Gallery ==
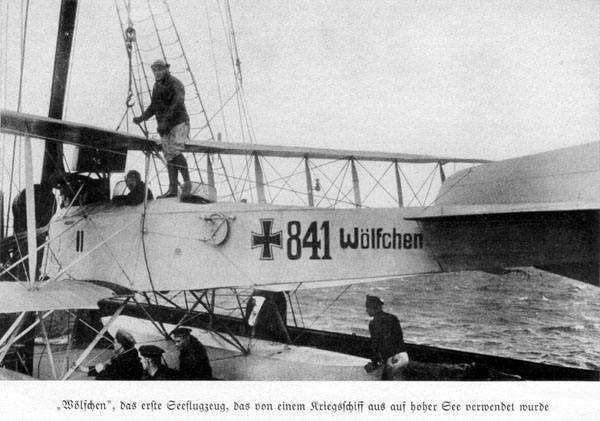
Aircraft Wölfchen

Commander Karl August Nerger

Map of the Voyage of Wolf

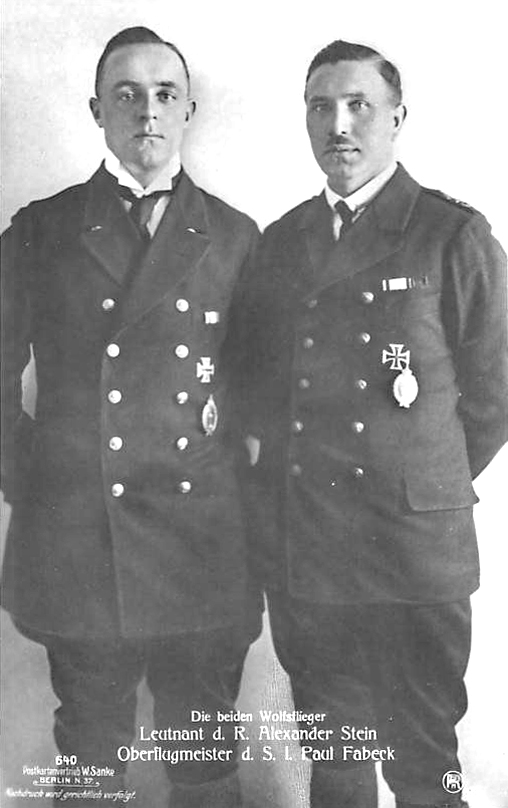
Pilots of the Wölfchen

== Notable people ==
- Gerald Haxton, secretary of playwright W. Somerset Maugham who was a prisoner aboard the SMS Wolf
- Karl Rose, naval officer who served under Karl August Nerger

== Bibliography ==
- Alexander, Roy, The Cruise of the Raider Wolf, Yale University Press, 1939.
- Australian War Memorial (2021). "Passengers taken prisoner from the 6557 ton Japanese freighter, Hitachi Maru". Australian War Memorial.
- Donaldson, A., The Amazing Cruise of the German Raider Wolf, New Century Press, Sydney, 1918.
- Fritz Witschetzky Das schwarze Schiff, Union Deutsche Verlagsgesellschaft, Stuttgart/Berlin/Leipzig, 1920.
- Frederic George Trayes, Five Months on a German Raider: Being the Adventures of an Englishman Captured by the "Wolf" , London : Headley, 1919.
- Guilliatt, Richard & Peter Hohnen, The Wolf: How One German Raider Terrorized the Allies in the Most Epic Voyage of WWI, William Heinemann Publ., Australia, 2009. ISBN 978-1-4165-7317-3
- Hoyt, Edwin P., Raider Wolf, The Voyage of Captain Nerger, 1916-1918, New York, 1974. ISBN 978-0-8397-7067-1
- Kinau, Jakob, Der Adjutant des Todes. Wolfs-Tagebuch, (Quickborn-Verlag), Hamburg 1934.
- Leimbach, Fritz, 64 000 Seemeilen Kaperfahrt. Erlebnisse eines Matrosen auf dem Hilfskreuzer "Wolf", Berlin (West-Ost-Verlag) 1937, Onlineversion: , Reprint by Maritimepress 2012. ISBN 978-3954271344
- Julio Molina Font: Cádiz y el vapor-correo de Filipinas "Carlos de Eizaguirre", 1904 - 1917. Historia de un naufragio (Cádiz and the Philippine mail steamer "Carlos de Eizaguirre". History of a shipwreck), 2. expanded ed. Cádiz (Universidad de Cádiz, Servicio de Publicaciones) 2007. ISBN 978-84-98281-19-4
- Nerger, Karl August, S.M.S. Wolf, Scherl Verlag Berlin, 1918.
- Plivier, Theodor, Des Kaiser Kulis. Roman der deutschen Kriegsflotte, Berlin 1930.
- Schmalenbach, Paul; German Raiders: A History of Auxiliary Cruisers of the German Navy, 1895-1945, Naval Institute Press, 1979. ISBN 0-87021-824-7
- Stephenson, Charles (2009). Germany's Asia-Pacific Empire: Colonialism and Naval Policy, 1885-1914. Boydell Press. ISBN 9781843835189. - Total pages: 292
