= Karl Rose (naval officer) =

German naval officer

Karl Rose was a naval officer in the German Imperial Navy who served under Karl August Nerger aboard the SMS Wolf during World War I. During the Wolf's 451-day sortie, Rose became Nerger's second in command after the death of kapitänleutnant Iwan Brandes.

Rose was made prize captain of two separate ships during the voyage; the Japanese mailship Hitachi Maru, and the coal freighter Igotz Mendi. On 7 November 1917, the order was given to sink The Hitachi Maru in order to preserve what little coal there was for the Wolf's engines. However, Rose would soon be given command of another prize ship ten days later with the capture of the Igotz Mendi. Rose would command the Igotz Mendi for the rest of the voyage back to Germany.

Rose's fortunes would change when he accidentally ran his ship aground on the beaches of Denmark. While passing through a minefield laid by the German Navy, Rose mistook a lighthouse for a German patrol boat. Eventually several Danish warships arrived and Rose attempted to pass the vessel off as a civilian German merchant ship. However, the Danish sailors were not fooled and refused Rose's requests to be towed, despite his best efforts to maintain control of the situation and return to the ship back to Wilhelmshaven as a prize. Once aground, Rose and the entire crew were detained by the Danish military police. This caused a great deal of political bitterness between Denmark and Germany.

There was speculation that Kaiser Wilhelm II would declare war on Denmark for the Danish government's refusal to turn Rose and his men over to the Reich. Rose was held in Danish prison for the remainder of the war. After leaving the navy, became a merchant officer with the Hamburg America Line and served with them until he died.

== Literature ==
- Peter Hohnen & Richard Guilliatt, The Wolf - The true story of an epic voyage of destruction in World War One, 2009, Bantam Press, ISBN 059306075X
