= First Biennium =

Period of Spanish history, 1931–1933

The First Biennium, also known as the Social-Azañist Biennium, the Reformist Biennium, or the Transformer Biennium, was the period between the proclamation of the Second Spanish Republic on 14 April 1931 and the 1933 Spanish general election.

== Constituent Period (April–December 1931) ==
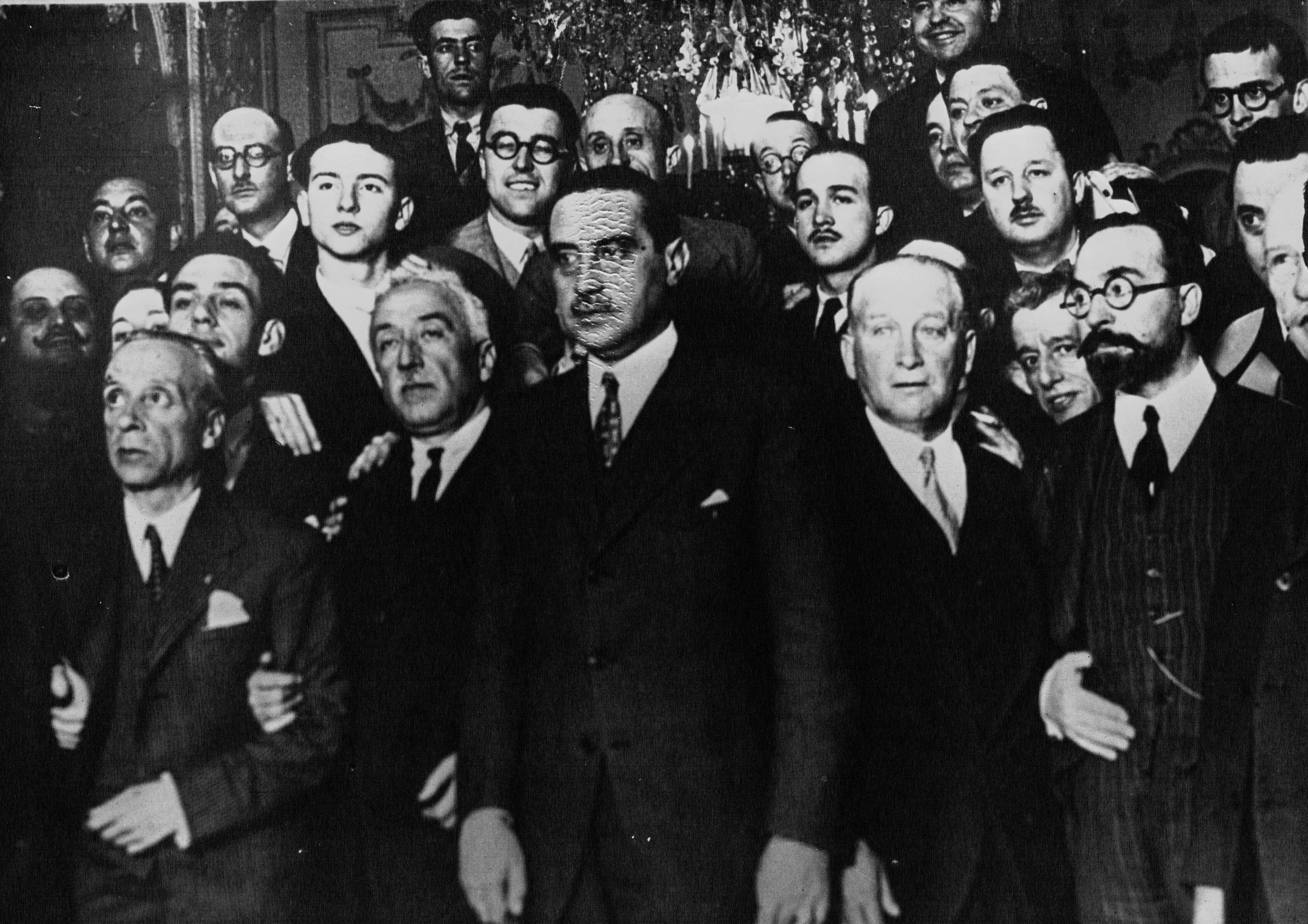
Members of the Provisional Government of the Republic, from left to right: Álvaro Albornoz, Niceto Alcalá-Zamora, Miguel Maura, Francisco Largo Caballero, Fernando de los Ríos, and Alejandro Lerroux.

The Provisional Government of the Second Spanish Republic lasted from the Proclamation of the Republic until the formation of the first permanent government on 15 December, six days after the ratification of the 1931 Spanish Constitution. Until 15 October 1931, the Provisional Government was presided by Niceto Alcalá-Zamora, who resigned after his strong opposition to the Article 26 of the Constitution, which addressed the "religious question", Manuel Azaña followed him.

== The Social-Azañist Biennium (December 1931 – September 1933) ==
On 15 December 1931 Azaña introduced his second government, made up entirely of leftist republicans from Republican Action, the Radical Socialist Republican Party, ORGA, and Republican Left of Catalonia. Azaña intended to implement a vast reform program in order to imitate the politics of the Restoration. These reforms also sought to solve many of the "pending questions" (the "social question", the "religious question", the "agrarian question" and the "military question" in particular). However, both social and corporate groups fiercely opposed the reforms, claiming that the government was attempting to "dismount" them from the positions they had earned.

=== End of Azaña's government ===
The Azañist government's popularity peaked in autumn 1932, as it effectively contained the anarchists and defeated the monarchist uprising in the Spanish military. The General Workers' Union supported the government, despite the growing influence of the CNT. By this time, the Republic also reformed the military, public schooling, and started a big program for public works.

However, by 1933, the government surrendered to domestic and foreign pressures. The government's decline started with the anarchist insurrection, which led to the Casas Viejas incident. This led to a big plunge in the government's perceived credibility. Along with a recession and rising unemployment and the growth of National Catholicism, Azaña resigned as President of the Republic.

== See also ==
- Second biennium of the Second Spanish Republic

== Bibliography ==
- Barrio Alonso, Ángeles (2004). La Modernización de España (1917–1939). Política y sociedad (in Spanish). ISBN 84-9756-223-2.
- Aróstegui, Julio (1997). La Guerra Civil. La ruptura democrática. ISBN 84-7679-320-0.
- Casanova, Julián (2007). República y Guerra Civil. Vol. 8 de la Historia de España, dirigida por Josep Fontana y Ramón Villares (in Spanish). ISBN 978-84-8432-878-0.
- Gil Pecharromán, Julio (1997). La Segunda República. Esperanzas y frustraciones (in Spanish). ISBN 84-7679-319-7.
- Jackson, Gabriel (1976). The Spanish Republic and the Civil War, 1931–1939. ISBN 84-7423-006-3.
- Juliá, Santos (1999). Un siglo de España. Política y sociedad (in Spanish). ISBN 84-9537903-1.
